= List of Italian films of 1963 =

Following is a sortable list of films produced in Italy in 1963.

Title	Italian-language title	Director	Cast	Genre	Notes
8½	8½	Federico Fellini	Marcello Mastroianni, Anouk Aimée, Sandra Milo	Comedy drama	Italian-French co-production
	90 notti in giro per il mondo				
	Acqua e chiacchiere				
—N/a	Adultero lui, adultera lei	Raffaello Matarazzo	Marilù Tolo, Luigi Giuliani, Umberto D'Orsi	—N/a	
—N/a	Africa sexy	Roberto Bianchi Montero	Jimmy Montand, Joe Said, Raymond Loyal	—N/a	
	Annella di Porta Capuana				
Any Number Can Win	—N/a	Henri Verneuil	Jean Gabin, Alain Delon, Viviane Romance	Crime	French-Italian co-production
	Avventura al motel				
	Avventure sull'acqua				
Black Sabbath	I tre volti della paura	Mario Bava	Boris Karloff, Mark Damon, Michèle Mercier	Horror	Italian-French co-production
	Bolle				
Brennus, Enemy of Rome	Brenno il nemico di Roma	Giacomo Gentilomo	Gordon Mitchell, Ursula Davis, Tony Kendall	—N/a	
	Canzoni in... bikini				
	Canzoni nel mondo				
The Carabineers	—N/a	Jean-Luc Godard	Albert Juross, Marino Masé, Geneviève Galéa	Drama, war	French-Italian co-production
	Carmen di Trastevere				
	Caterina di Russia				
	Chi lavora è perduto				
	Chiamata a Scirocco				
Castle In Sweden	—N/a	Roger Vadim	Jean-Claude Brialy, Monica Vitti, Françoise Hardy	Comedy	French-Italian co-production
23rd Ecumenical Vatican Council	Concilio Ecumenico Vaticano II	Antonio Pertucci	—N/a	—N/a	
Colossus and the Headhunters	Maciste contro i cacciatori di teste	Guido Maletesta	Kirk Morris, Laura Brown, Demeter Bitenc	Peplum	
The Conjugal Bed	Una Storia moderna: L'ape regina	Marco Ferreri	Marina Vlady, Ugo Tognazzi, Walter Giller	Comedy	Italian-French co-production
Contempt	Disprezzo	Jean-Luc Godard	Brigitte Bardot, Michel Piccoli, Jack Palance	Drama	French-Italian co-production
—N/a	D'Artagnan contro i tre moschettieri	Fulvio Tului	Fernando Lamas, Gloria Milland, Roberto Risso	—N/a	
	Dagli Zar alla Bandiera Rossa				
	Delitto e castigo				
—N/a	La belva di Saigon	Jürgen Roland	Marianne Koch, Heinz Drache, Horst Frank	—N/a	West German-Italian co-production
—N/a	Divorzio alla siciliana	Enzo Di Gianni	Moira Orfei, Paolo Carlini, Gina Rovere	—N/a	
Chicken Feed For Little Birds	—N/a	Marcel Carné	Dany Saval, Paul Meurisse, Suzy Delair	Comedy	French-Italian co-production
Rififi in Tokyo	—N/a	Jacques Deray	Karlheinz Böhm, Charles Vanel, Barbara Lass	Crime	French-Italian co-production
Gunfight at Red Sands	Duello nel Texas	Ricardo Blaso	Richard Harrison, Giacomo Rossi-Stuart, Sara Lezana	Western	Spanish-Italian co-production
Gunfight at High Noon	El sabor de la venganza	Joaquín Luis Romero Marchent	Richard Harrison, Gloria Millard, Miguel Palenzuela	Spanish-Italian co-production	
The Empty Canvas	La noia	Damiano Damiani	Horst Buchholz, Catherine Spaak Bette Davis	—N/a	Italian-French co-production
Conquest of Mycene	Ercole contro Moloch	Giorgio Ferroni	Gordon Scott, Alessandra Panaro, Arturo Dominici	Adventure	Italian-French co-production
Hercules, Samson and Ulysses	Ercole sfida Sansone	Pietro Francisci	Kirk Morris, Richard Lloyd, Aldo Giuffrè	Adventure, fantasy	
The Fiances	I fidanzati	Ermanno Olmi	Carlo Cabrini, Anna Canzi	Romance	
	Follie d'estate				
Fort du Fou	—N/a	Leo Joannon	Alain Saury, Jacques Harden, Foun-Sen	War	French-Italian co-production
Germinal	—N/a	Yves Allégret	Jean Sorel, Berthe Grandval, Claude Brasseur	Drama	French-Italian co-production
The Ghost	Lo spettro	Riccardo Freda	Barbara Steele, Peter Baldwin, Elio Jotta	Horror	
	Giacobbe ed Esau				
	Giacobbe, l'uomo che lottò con Dio				
The Girl Who Knew Too Much	La ragazza che sapeva troppo	Mario Bava	John Saxon, Letícia Román, Valentina Cortese	Mystery, thriller	
—N/a	Gli arcangeli				
—N/a	Gli imbroglioni	Lucio Fulci	Walter Chiari, Antonella Lualdi	—N/a	
	Gli italiani si divertono così				
—N/a	Gli onorevoli	Sergio Corbucci	—N/a	—N/a	
	Gli spettri				
—N/a	Gli ultimi	Vito Pandolfi, David Turoldi	Adelfi Galli	—N/a	
Gold for the Caesars	Oro per i Cesari	—N/a	Jeffrey Hunter, Mylène Demongeot, Ron Randell	Peplum	Italian-French co-production
Goliath and the Rebel Slave	Goliath e la schiava ribelle	Mario Caiano, Alfonso Brescia	Gordon Scott, Ombretta Colli, Massimo Serato	—N/a	Italian-French co-production
Hands Over the City	Le mani sulla città	Francesco Rosi	Rod Steiger, Guido Alberti, Carlo Fermariello	—N/a	
	Hong Kong un addio				
The Blancheville Monster	Horror	Alberto De Martino	Gérard Tichy, Joan Hills	Horror	Italian-Spanish co-production
Lizards	I basilischi	Lina Wertmüller	Toni Petruzzi, Stefano Satta Flores, Sergio Farrannino	—N/a	
	I cuori infranti				
Fighting Legions	I diavoli di Spartivento	Leopoldo Salvona	John Barrymore, Jr., Giacomo Rossi Stuart, Scilla Gabel	Drama	
The Ten Gladiators	I dieci gladiatori	Gianfranco Parolini	Roger Browne, Jose Greci, Dan Vadis	—N/a	
—N/a	I fuorilegge del matrimonio	Valentino Orsini, Vittorio Taviani, Paolo Taviani	Marina Malfatti, Scilla Gabel, Annie Girardot	—N/a	
	I mali mestieri				
	I misteri di Roma				
15 from Rome	I mostri	Dino Risi	Ugo Tognazzi, Vittorio Gassman, Marisa Merlini	—N/a	
—N/a	I piaceri del mondo	Vinicio Maranucci	Anita Rachid, Carmen, Miram Michelson	—N/a	
	I piaceri proibiti				
	I quattro moschettieri				
	I quattro tassisti				
	I ragazzi che si amano				
Taboos of the World	I tabù	Romolo Marcellini	—N/a		
—N/a	I terribili sette	Raffaello Matarazzo	—N/a	Action, crime	
	Ignazio e Kresy innamorati e offesi				
The Executioner of Venice	Il boia di Venezia	Luigi Capuano	Lex Barker, Alessandra Panaro, Mario Petro	Adventure	
The Boom	Il Boom	Vittorio De Sica	Alberto Sordi, Gianna Maria Canale, Silvio Battistini	Comedy drama	
—N/a	Il comandante	Paolo Heusch	Totò, Andreina Pagnani, Luciano Marin	Comedy	
Train to Milan	Il criminale	Marcello Baldi	Jack Palance, Yvonne Furneaux, Salvo Randone	—N/a	
—N/a	Il demonio	Brunello Rondi	Daliah Lavi, Frank Wolff, Giovanni Cristofanelli	—N/a	Italian-French co-production
To Bed or Not To Bed	Il diavolo	Gian Luigi Polidoro	Alberto Sordi, Gunilla Elm Tornqvist, Anne-Charlotte Sjoberg	Comedy	
The Slave	Il figlio di Spartacus	Sergio Corbucci	Steve Reeves, Jacques Sernas, Gianna Maria Canale	Peplum	French/Italian co-production
	Il fornaretto di Venezia				
	Il maestro di Vigevano				
	Il magnifico avventuriero				
	Il mito				
—N/a	Il monaco di Monza	Sergio Corbucci	Totò, Nino Taranto, Erminio Macario		
	Il paradiso all'ombre delle spade				
	Il pirata del diavolo				
	Il processo di Verona				
	Il putto				
	Il regalo				
	Il regno del terrore				
	Il risveglio di Dracula				
	Il segno del coyote				
	Il segno di Zorro				
	Il signor Rossi va a sciare				
	Il successo				
	Il taglio del bosco				
	Il terrorista				
	In Italia si chiama amore				
	Italia proibita				
	Jedal dar mahtab				
Judex	—N/a	Georges Franju	Channing Pollock, Francine Bergé, Édith Scob	Crime	French-Italian co-production
	Jusqu'au bout du monde				
Kali Yug: Goddess of Vengeance	Kali Yug, la dea della vendetta	Mario Camerini	Paul Guers, Senta Berger, Lex Barker	—N/a	Italian-French-West German co-production
Katarsis	Sfida al diavolo	Giuseppe Veggezz	Christopher Lee, Giorgio Adrisson, Vittoria Centroni	Horror	
	L'amore difficile				
	L'arma segreta				
	L'aîné des Ferchaux				
	L'eroe di Babilonia				
The Reluctant Spy	—N/a	Jean-Charles Dudrumet	Jean Marais, Geneviève Page, Maurice Teynac	—N/a	French-Italian co-production
The Immortal	—N/a	Alain Robbe-Grillet	Jacques Doniol-Valcroze, Françoise Brion	Avant-garde	French-Italian co-production
	L'invincibile cavaliere mascherato				
—N/a	La ballata dei mariti	Fabrizio Taglioni	Marisa Del Frate, Aroldo Tieri, Memmo Carotenuto	—N/a	Italian-Spanish co-production
	La bella di Lodi				
The Blind Woman of Sorrento					
	La calda vita				
	La città accusa				
	La corruzione				
	La cuisine au beurre				
	La donna degli altri è sempre più bella				
Women of the World	La donna nel mondo	Gualtiero Jacopetti		Documentary	
	La libertà				
	La mano sul fucile				
	La máscara de Scaramouche				
	La parmigiana				
	La porteuse de pain				
The Doll	La pupa	Giuseppe Orlandini	Riccardo Garrone, Ettore Manni, Michèle Mercier	Exploitation	
The Anger	La rabbia	Giovannino Guareschi, Pier Paolo Pasolini		Documentary	
Bebo's Girl	La ragazza di Bube	Luigi Comencini	George Chakiris, Marc Michel, Dany Paris	—N/a	
	La scala di seta	Filippo Crivelli			
	La smania addosso				
	La statua di Stalin				
	La tigre dei sette mari				
The Virgin of Nuremberg	La vergine di Norimberga	Antonio Margheriti	Rossana Podestà, Georges Rivière, Christopher Lee	Horror	
	La vie conjugale				
—N/a	La visita	Antonio Pietrangeli	Sandra Milo, François Périer, Mario Adorf	—N/a	
Landru	—N/a	Claude Chabrol	Charles Denner, Danielle Darrieux, Michèle Morgan	Crime	French-Italian co-production
	Le 7 fatiche di Ali Baba				
	Le anime morte				
	Le bon roi Dagobert				
	Le città proibite				
Two Are Guilty	Uno dei tre	André Cayatte	Anthony Perkins, Jean-Claude Brialy, Renato Salvatori	Drama	French-Italian co-production
	Le jour et l'heure				
	Le magot de Josefa				
	Le meurtrier				
	Le monachine				
	Le motorizzate				
	Le ore dell'amore				
	Le roi du village				
	Le tre spade di Zorro				
	Le verdi bandiere di Allah				
	Le voyage à Biarritz				
	Legittima difesa				
	Les bonnes causes				
	Les femmes d'abord				
	Les grands chemins				
	Les saintes nitouches				
Monsieur Gangster	In famiglia si spara	Georges Lautner	Lino Ventura, Horst Frank, Sabine Sinjen	Comedy	French-West German-Italian co-production
The Leopard	Il gattopardo	Luchino Visconti	Burt Lancaster, Alain Delon, Claudia Cardinale	Epic, Historical film	Italian-French co-production
	Lo sceicco rosso				
	Lo sparviero dei Caraibi				
	Lo zoo di vetro				
	Los conquistadores del Pacífico				
	Luisa Sanfelice				
	Maciste contro i Mongoli				
	Maciste, l'eroe più grande del mondo				
	Mafia alla sbarra				
	Maigret voit rouge				
	Mare matto				
	Mathias Sandorf				
	Mondo cane 2				
	Mondo matto al neon				
Muriel	—N/a	Alain Resnais	Delphine Seyrig, Jean-Pierre Kérien, Nita Klein	Drama	French-Italian co-production
Be Careful Ladies	—N/a	André Hunebelle	Paul Meurisse, Danielle Darrieux, Michèle Morgan	Comedy	French-Italian co-production
	Noches de Casablanca				
	Notti e donne proibite				
	Notti nude				
	Nozze di sangue				
	Obiettivo ragazze	Mario Mattoli		comedy	
The Organizer	I compagni	Mario Monicelli	Marcello Mastroianni, Renato Salvatori, Annie Girardot	Drama	Italian-French-Yugoslavian co-production
—N/a	Omicron	Ugo Gregoretti	Renato Salvatori, Rosemary Dexter	Science fiction	
O.S.S. 117	—N/a	André Hunebelle	Kerwin Mathews, Nadia Sanders, Henri-Jacques Huet	Spy	French-Italian co-production
	Paras	Gillo Pontecorvo		documentary	
	Peau de banane				
Highway Pickup	Pelle d'oca	Julien Duvivier	Robert Hossein, Catherine Rouvel, Jean Sorel	Crime, drama	French-Italian co-production
	Perseo l'invincibile				
	Pittura d'oggi nel Messico				
	Processo a Gesù				
	Processo a Stalin				
	Queste pazze pazze donne				
	Questo mondo proibito				
	Raffaello in casa				
Rat Trap	Le Rat d'Amérique	Jean-Gabriel Albicocco	Charles Aznavour, Marie Laforêt, Franco Fabrizi	Adventure	French-Italian co-production
The Reunion	La rimpatriata	Damiano Damiani	Francisco Rabal, Walter Chiari, Letícia Román	—N/a	Italian-French co-production
	Rinaldo in campo				
	Ritorno dall'abisso				
Ro.Go.Pa.G.	Laviamoci il cervello	Roberto Rossellini, Jean-Luc Godard, Pier Paolo Pasolini, Ugo Gregoretti		—N/a	Italian-French co-production
	Rocambole				
	Russia sotto inchiesta				
	Sabato, domenica e lunedì				
Sandokan the Great	Sandokan, la tigre di Mompracem	Umberto Lenzi	Steve Reeves, Geneviève Grad, Andrea Bosic	Adventure	Italian-Spanish-French co-production
	Sansone contro i pirati				
	Scanzonatissimo				
	Se necesita chico				
	Sera di pioggia				
	Servizio speciale – Gli apostoli				
	Sexy ad alta tensione				
	Sexy al neon bis				
	Sexy che scotta				
	Sexy follie				
	Sexy magico				
	Sexy nel mondo				
	Sexy nudo				
	The Most Prohibited Sex				
	Sfida al re di Castiglia				
Scorching Sands	Schiava di Bagdad	Pierre Gaspard-Huit	Anna Karina, Gérard Barray, António Vilar	Adventure	French-Italian-Spanish co-production
	Siamo tutti pomicioni				
Son of the Circus	Il figlio del circo	Sergio Grieco	Ramuncho, Pierre Mondy, Antonella Lualdi	Musical comedy	Co-production with France
	Stemmati di Calabria				
Stop Train 349	Un treno è fermo da Berlino	Rolf Hädrich	José Ferrer, Sean Flynn, Nicole Courcel	—N/a	West German-French-Italian co-production
	Storie sulla sabbia				
Storm Over Ceylon	Tempesta su Ceylon	Giovanni Roccardi (Italian Version), Gerd Oswald	Lex Barker, Ann Smyrner, Magali Noël	—N/a	Italian-French-West German co-production
	Superespectáculos del mundo				
Sweet and Sour	Confetti al pepe	Jacques Baratier	Guy Bedos, Jean-Paul Belmondo, Francis Blanche	Comedy	French-Italian co-production
	Symphonie pour un massacre				
	Taras Bulba, il cosacco				
	Taur, il re della forza bruta				
	Tela de araña				
	Tempo di Roma				
Yesterday, Today and Tomorrow	I dieci gladiatori	Vittorio De Sica	Sophia Loren, Marcello Mastroianni, Aldo Giuffrè	Comedy	Italian-French co-production
	Tenente Sheridan: L'ultima verità				
	Tenente Sheridan: Un uomo nuovo				
The Thursday	Il giovedi	Dino Risi	Walter Chiari, Michèle Mercier, Roberto Ciccolini	—N/a	
Tomb of Torture	Metempsyco	Antonio Boccacci	Annie Alberti, Adriano Micantoni, Marco Mariani	—N/a	
Torpedo Bay	Beta Som	Charles Frend, Bruno Vailati	James Mason, Gabriele Ferzetti	war	
	Totò contro i 4				
	Totò e Cleopatra				
	Tutto il bello dell'uomo				
	Tutto è musica				
	Universo proibito				
	Uno strano tipo				
	Urlo contro melodia nel Cantagiro '63				
	Ursus nella terra di fuoco				
	Venere imperiale	Jean Delannoy		historical	
	Via Margutta	Mario Camerini		comedy-drama	
Vice and Virtue	—N/a	Roger Vadim	Annie Girardot, Catherine Deneuve	Drama	French-Italian co-production
	Vino whisky e acqua salata				
	Vita e luoghi di Arlecchino				
The Whip and the Body	La frusta e il corpo	Mario Bava	Daliah Lavi, Christopher Lee, Tony Kendall	Horror	Italian-French co-production
Apache Gold	La valle dei lunghi coltelli	Harald Reinl	Lex Barker, Pierre Brice, Mario Adorf	Western	West German-Italian-French co-production
	Wounds of Hunger				
Yesterday, Today and Tomorrow	Ieri, oggi e domani	Vittorio De Sica	Sophia Loren, Marcello Mastroianni, Aldo Giuffrè	Comedy	Italian-French co-production
Your Turn, Darling	—N/a	Bernard Borderie	Eddie Constantine, Christiane Minazzoli, Elga Andersen	Spy film, thriller	French-Italian co-production
Samson and the Slave Queen	Zorro contro Maciste	Umberto Lenzi	Pierre Brice, Alan Steel, Moira Orfei	Adventure	
	Zorro e i tre moschettieri		Gordon Scott		

== See also ==
- 1963 in film
