= List of French films of 1963 =

A list of films produced in France in 1963.

Title	Director	Cast	Genre	Notes
8½	Federico Fellini	Marcello Mastroianni, Claudia Cardinale, Anouk Aimée	Comedy-drama	Italian–French co-production
The Accident	Edmond T. Gréville	Magali Noël, Georges Rivière, Danik Patisson	Crime	
Any Number Can Win	Henri Verneuil	Jean Gabin, Alain Delon, Viviane Romance	Crime	French–Italian co-production
Apache Gold	Harald Reinl	Lex Barker, Pierre Brice, Mario Adorf	Western	West German–Italian–French co-production
The Bakery Girl of Monceau	Éric Rohmer	Barbet Schroeder, Michèle Girardon, Bertrand Tavernier	Drama	
The Bamboo Stroke	Jean Boyer	François Périer, Micheline Presle, Jean Richard	Comedy	
Bay of Angels	Jacques Demy	Jeanne Moreau, Claude Mann, Paul Guers	Drama	
Be Careful Ladies	André Hunebelle	Paul Meurisse, Danielle Darrieux, Michèle Morgan	Comedy	French–Italian co-production
Black Sabbath	Mario Bava	Boris Karloff, Mark Damon, Michèle Mercier	Horror	Italian-French-American co-production
Bluebeard	Claude Chabrol	Charles Denner, Danielle Darrieux, Michèle Morgan	Crime	French–Italian co-production
The Cage	Robert Darène	Marina Vlady, Jean Servais, Colette Duval	Comedy-drama	
The Carabineers	Jean-Luc Godard	Albert Juross, Marino Masé, Geneviève Galéa	Comedy, Drama, war	French-Italian co-production
Carom Shots	Marcel Bluwal	Jean-Claude Brialy, Michel Serrault, Louis de Funès	Comedy	
Castle in Sweden	Roger Vadim	Jean-Claude Brialy, Monica Vitti, Françoise Hardy	Comedy	French–Italian co-production
Chicken Feed For Little Birds	Marcel Carné	Dany Saval, Paul Meurisse, Suzy Delair	Comedy	French-Italian co-production
Codine	Henri Colpi	Françoise Brion, Nelly Borgeaud, Maurice Sarfati	Drama	French-Romanian co-production
The Conjugal Bed	Marco Ferreri	Marina Vlady, Ugo Tognazzi, Walter Giller	Comedy	Italian-French co-production
Conquest of Mycene	Giorgio Ferroni	Gordon Scott, Alessandra Panaro, Arturo Dominici	Adventure	Italian–French co-production
Contempt	Jean-Luc Godard	Brigitte Bardot, Michel Piccoli, Jack Palance	Drama	French–Italian co-production
The Day and the Hour	René Clément	Simone Signoret, Stuart Whitman	War drama	French–Italian co-production
The Devil and the Ten Commandments	Julien Duvivier	Michel Simon, Louis de Funès	Comedy drama	
Don't Tempt the Devil	Christian-Jacque	Marina Vlady, Bourvil, Virna Lisi, Pierre Brasseur	Crime	French-Italian co-production
The Empty Canvas	Damiano Damiani	Horst Buchholz, Catherine Spaak Bette Davis	Drama	Italian–French co-production
Enough Rope	Claude Autant-Lara	Marina Vlady, Robert Hossein, Maurice Ronet, Yvonne Furneaux, Gert Fröbe	Crime	French-Italian-West German co-production
The Fire Within	Louis Malle	Maurice Ronet, Jeanne Moreau, Lena Skerla	Drama	
Germinal	Yves Allégret	Jean Sorel, Berthe Grandval, Claude Brasseur	Drama	French-Italian co-production
Girl's Apartment	Michel Deville	Mylène Demongeot, Sylva Koscina, Renate Ewert	Comedy	Co-production with Italy and West Germany
Goliath and the Rebel Slave	Mario Caiano, Alfonso Brescia	Gordon Scott, Ombretta Colli, Massimo Serato	Adventure	Italian–French co-production
Highway Pickup	Julien Duvivier	Robert Hossein, Catherine Rouvel, Jean Sorel	Crime, drama	French–Italian co-production
Il demonio	Brunello Rondi	Daliah Lavi, Frank Wolff, Giovanni Cristofanelli	Horror	Italian-French co-production
Il Figlio del circo	Sergio Crieco	Ramuncho, Pierre Mondy, Antonella Lualdi	Comedy musical	Italian–French co-production
Josefa's Loot	Claude Autant-Lara	Anna Magnani, Bourvil, Pierre Brasseur	Comedy	
Judex	Georges Franju	Channing Pollock, Francine Bergé, Édith Scob	Crime	French-Italian co-production
Kali Yug: Goddess of Vengeance	Mario Camerini	Paul Guers, Senta Berger, Lex Barker	Adventure	Italian–French-West German co-production
L'Immortelle	Alain Robbe-Grillet	Françoise Brion, Jacques Doniol-Valcroze, Guido Celano	Avant-garde	French–Italian–Turkish co-production
Ladies First	Raoul André	Eddie Constantine, Christiane Minazzoli	Crime	French-Italian co-production
The Leopard	Luchino Visconti	Burt Lancaster, Alain Delon, Claudia Cardinale	Epic, historical film	Italian–French co-production
Les Abysses	Nikos Papatakis	Francine Bergé, Pascale de Boysson, Colette Regis	Drama	
Les Bricoleurs	Jean Girault	Francis Blance, Darry Cowl, Jacqueline Maillan	Thriller	
Les Tontons flingueurs	Georges Lautner	Lino Ventura, Bernard Blier, Francis Blanche	Comedy	French–Italian–West German co-production
Magnet of Doom	Jean-Pierre Melville	Jean-Paul Belmondo, Charles Vanel, Michèle Mercier	Crime	French-Italian co-production
Maigret Sees Red	Gilles Grangier	Jean Gabin, Françoise Fabian, Roland Armontel	Crime	
Mathias Sandorf	Georges Lampin	Louis Jourdan, Renaud Mary, Francisco Rabal	Adventure	
Méditerranée	Jean-Daniel Pollet and Volker Schlöndorff	Documentary	Experimental	
Miss Shumway Goes West	Jean Jabely	Tania Béryl, Harold Kay, René Lefebvre, Jess Hahn	Comedy drama	French-Argentine co-production
The Murderer Knows the Score	Pierre Chenal	Maria Schell, Paul Meurisse	Comedy, Crime	
Muriel ou Le temps d'un retour	Alain Resnais	Delphine Seyrig, Jean-Pierre Kérien, Nita Klein	Drama	French–Italian co-production
Ophélia	Claude Chabrol	Alida Valli, Claude Cerval, André Jocelyn, Juliette Mayniel	Drama	
The Organizer	Mario Monicelli	Marcello Mastroianni, Renato Salvatori, Annie Girardot	Drama	Italian-French-Yugoslavian co-production
OSS 117 se déchaîne	André Hunebelle	Kerwin Mathews, Irina Demich, Henri-Jacques Huet	Spy	French–Italian co-production
Rat Trap	Jean-Gabriel Albicocco	Charles Aznavour, Marie Laforêt, Franco Fabrizi	Adventure	French–Italian co-production
The Reunion	Damiano Damiani	Francisco Rabal, Walter Chiari, Letícia Román	Comedy. Drama	Italian-French co-production
Rififi in Tokyo	Jacques Deray	Karlheinz Böhm, Charles Vanel, Barbara Lass	Crime	French–Italian co-production
Ro.Go.Pa.G.	Roberto Rossellini, Jean-Luc Godard, Pier Paolo Pasolini, Ugo Gregoretti		Comedy drama	Italian–French co-production
The Sadistic Baron von Klaus	Jesús Franco	Ana Castor, Howard Vernon, Paula Martel	Horror	Spanish-French co-production
Sandokan the Great	Umberto Lenzi	Steve Reeves, Geneviève Grad, Andrea Bosic	Adventure	Italian–Spanish–French co-production
Shéhérazade	Pierre Gaspard-Huit	Anna Karina, Gérard Barray, António Vilar	Adventure	French–Italian–Spanish co-production
Stop Train 349	Rolf Hädrich	José Ferrer, Sean Flynn, Nicole Courcel	Drama thriller	West German–French–Italian co-production
Storm Over Ceylon	Giovanni Roccardi, Gerd Oswald	Lex Barker, Ann Smyrner, Magali Noël	Adventure	Italian–French–West German co-production
Stranger from Hong-Kong	Jacques Poitrenaud	Dalida, Philippe Nicaud, Tania Béryl, Serge Gainsbourg	Crime musical	
Suzanne's Career	Éric Rohmer	Catherine Sée, Jean-Louis Comolli, Patrick Bauchau	Drama	
Sweet and Sour	Jacques Baratier	Guy Bedos, Jean-Paul Belmondo, Francis Blanche	Comedy	French–Italian co-production
Symphony for a Massacre	Jacques Deray	Michel Auclair, Claude Dauphin, José Giovanni, Michèle Mercier, Daniela Rocca, Jean Rochefort, Charles Vanel	Crime	French-Italian co-production
The Threepenny Opera	Wolfgang Staudte	Curd Jürgens, Hildegard Knef, Gert Fröbe	Musical	Co-production with West Germany
Two Are Guilty	André Cayatte	Anthony Perkins, Jean-Claude Brialy, Renato Salvatori	Drama	French–Italian co-production
Un drôle de paroissien	Jean-Pierre Mocky	Bourvil, Francis Blanche, Jean Poiret	Comedy	
Vice and Virtue	Roger Vadim	Annie Girardot, Catherine Deneuve	Drama	French–Italian co-production
The Whip and the Body	Mario Bava	Christopher Lee, Daliah Lavi, Harriet Medin	Horror	Italian–French co-production
Yesterday, Today and Tomorrow	Vittorio De Sica	Sophia Loren, Marcello Mastroianni, Aldo Giuffrè	Comedy	Italian–French co-production
Your Turn, Darling	Bernard Borderie	Eddie Constantine, Christiane Minazzoli, Elga Andersen	Spy film, thriller	French–Italian co-production

== See also ==
- 1963 in France
