= 1963 in film =

The year 1963 in film involved some significant events, including the big-budget epic Cleopatra and two films with all-star casts, How the West Was Won and It's a Mad, Mad, Mad, Mad World.

== Top-grossing films (U.S.) ==
The top ten 1963 released films by box office gross in North America are as follows:

Highest-grossing films of 1963
Rank	Title	Distributor	Domestic rentals
1	Cleopatra	20th Century Fox	$26,000,000
2	How the West Was Won	MGM	$20,932,883
3	It's a Mad, Mad, Mad, Mad World	United Artists	$20,800,000
4	Tom Jones	United Artists	$17,070,000
5	Irma la Douce	United Artists	$11,921,784
6	Son of Flubber	Buena Vista	$9,100,000
7	Dr. No	United Artists	$6,435,000
8	Charade	Universal	$6,363,000
9	Bye Bye Birdie	Columbia	$6,200,000
10	Come Blow Your Horn; Move Over, Darling	Paramount; 20th Century Fox	$6,000,000

== Events ==
- January 9 – Joseph Vogel resigns as president of MGM and is replaced by Robert O'Brien.
- February 20 – The classic epic western How the West Was Won premieres in the United States. It is an instant success with both audiences and critics and becomes the biggest moneymaker for MGM since Ben-Hur.
- June 12 – Cleopatra, starring Elizabeth Taylor, Rex Harrison and Richard Burton, premieres at the Rivoli Theatre in New York City. Its staggering production costs nearly bankrupted Twentieth Century Fox and the adulterous affair between Taylor and Burton made the publicity even worse. Cleopatra marked the only instance that a film would be the highest-grossing film of a year while still losing money, thus establishing it as, at the time, the biggest box office disaster in cinema history. The film's terrible reception harmed the reputation of director Joseph L. Mankiewicz, who had an esteemed career for directing classics like A Letter to Three Wives, All About Eve, Julius Caesar, The Barefoot Contessa, Guys and Dolls, and Suddenly Last Summer. It effectively destroyed the career of its well-known producer Walter Wanger, who never worked in Hollywood or on another film again; he died five years later at the age of 74 of a heart attack. Much of the blame for the film's failures could be pointed at Taylor's super-diva personality, her health issues, her and Burton's adulterous affair, and the studio's inadequate management. It wouldn't be until two years later that Rodgers and Hammerstein's adaptation of The Sound of Music would help rescue Fox from bankruptcy by becoming one of the highest-grossing motion pictures of all time.
- November 7 – The comedy It's a Mad, Mad, Mad, Mad World premieres, with one of the finest all-star ensemble casts ever. It is also the first comedy film ever directed by Stanley Kramer, best known for directing serious human drama films on controversial subjects like The Defiant Ones, Inherit the Wind, Judgment at Nuremberg, and Guess Who's Coming to Dinner.
- December 25 – Walt Disney's production of The Sword in the Stone premieres. It is the second adaptation of T. H. White's The Once and Future King after the Alan Jay Lerner and Frederick Loewe musical Camelot, the first cinematic adaptation of the novel, and the 13th film adaptation of the legend of King Arthur.

== Awards ==
Academy Awards:

Best Picture: Tom Jones — Woodfall, United Artists-Lopert (British)
Best Director: Tony Richardson – Tom Jones
Best Actor: Sidney Poitier – Lilies of the Field
Best Actress: Patricia Neal – Hud
Best Supporting Actor: Melvyn Douglas – Hud
Best Supporting Actress: Margaret Rutherford – The V.I.P.s
Best Foreign Language Film: 8½ (Otto e mezzo), directed by Federico Fellini, Italy

Golden Globe Awards:

Drama:
Best Picture: The Cardinal
Best Actor: Sidney Poitier - Lilies of the Field
Best Actress: Leslie Caron - The L-Shaped Room

Comedy or Musical:
Best Picture: Tom Jones
Best Actor: Alberto Sordi - To Bed or Not to Bed
Best Actress: Shirley MacLaine - Irma la Douce

Other
Best Supporting Actor: John Huston - The Cardinal
Best Supporting Actress: Margaret Rutherford – The V.I.P.s
Best Director: Elia Kazan - America America

Palme d'Or (Cannes Film Festival):

The Leopard (Il Gattopardo), directed by Luchino Visconti, Italy

Golden Lion (Venice Film Festival):

Hands Over the City (Le mani sulla città), directed by Francesco Rosi, Italy

Golden Bear (Berlin Film Festival):

Il diavolo (To Bed... or Not to Bed), directed by Gian Luigi Polidoro, Italy

== 1963 film releases ==
United States unless stated

=== January–March ===
- January 1963
  - 16 January
    - The Hook
    - Son of Flubber
  - 22 January
    - The Young Racers
  - 25 January
    - The Raven
  - 30 January
    - Diamond Head
- February 1963
  - 13 February
    - 8½ (Italy)
    - A Child Is Waiting
  - 14 February
    - The Day Mars Invaded Earth
  - 27 February
    - Follow the Boys
- March 1963
  - 1 March
    - High and Low (Japan)
  - 3 March
    - California
    - The Long Ships
  - 4 March
    - In the Cool of the Day
  - 6 March
    - Diary of a Madman
    - Papa's Delicate Condition
  - 7 March
    - I Could Go On Singing
  - 15 March
    - House of the Damned
  - 21 March
    - The Balcony
  - 26 March
    - Operation Bikini
  - 27 March
    - Come Fly with Me
    - The Courtship of Eddie's Father
  - 28 March
    - The Birds
    - Love Is a Ball
  - 29 March
    - Miracle of the White Stallions

=== April–June ===
- April 1963
  - 3 April
    - It Happened at the World's Fair
    - My Six Loves
    - Nine Hours to Rama
    - The Ugly American
  - 4 April
    - Bye Bye Birdie
    - Call Me Bwana
  - 8 April
    - The Sadist
  - 13 April
    - Critic's Choice
  - 17 April
    - The Man from the Diners' Club
  - 21 April
    - Youth of the Beast (Japan)
  - 24 April
    - Free, White and 21
  - 29 April
    - Flaming Creatures
- May 1963
  - May 12
    - Lord of the Flies (United Kingdom)
  - 15 May
    - Black Zoo
    - Drums of Africa
  - 16 May
    - Spencer's Mountain
  - 20 May
    - Maniac
  - 22 May
    - Dime with a Halo
  - 29 May
    - 55 Days at Peking
    - Hud
    - The List of Adrian Messenger
    - Tammy and the Doctor
- June 1963
  - 2 June
    - Savage Sam
  - 4 June
    - The Nutty Professor
  - 5 June
    - Come Blow Your Horn
    - Irma la Douce
    - Lancelot and Guinevere
  - 12 June
    - Cleopatra
    - Donovan's Reef
    - The Girl Hunters
    - Island of Love
  - 15 June
    - The Yellow Canary
  - 17 June
    - The Mouse on the Moon
    - The Terror
  - 19 June
    - Captain Sindbad
    - Jason and the Argonauts
    - PT 109 released five months before John F. Kennedy was assassinated in Dallas, Texas.
    - The Stripper
  - 21 June
    - A Gathering of Eagles

=== July–September ===
- July 1963
  - 4 July
    - The Great Escape
  - 6 July
    - Blood Feast
  - 7 July
    - Summer Magic
  - 17 July
    - Tarzan's Three Challenges
    - The Thrill of It All
  - 31 July
    - Cattle King
    - Gidget Goes to Rome
    - Toys in the Attic
- August 1963
  - 7 August
    - Beach Party
    - For Love or Money
  - 10 August
    - The Young and The Brave
  - 11 August
    - Matango (Japan)
  - 14 August
    - Flipper
  - 15 August
    - Billy Liar (United Kingdom)
    - Promises! Promises!
  - 17 August
    - Black Sabbath
  - 18 August
    - A Ticklish Affair
  - 21 August
    - Cairo
    - The Caretakers
    - The Three Stooges Go Around the World in a Daze
  - 28 August
    - The Gun Hawk
    - The Haunted Palace
- September 1963
  - 2 September
    - The Cool World
  - 4 September
    - The Crawling Hand
    - Wall of Noise
  - 6 September
    - Goldilocks and the Three Bares
  - 11 September
    - Of Love and Desire
    - Shock Corridor
    - Twice-Told Tales
  - 13 September
    - The V.I.P.s
  - 18 September
    - The Haunting
    - In the French Style
    - X: The Man with the X-ray Eyes
    - The Young Swingers
  - 19 September
    - The V.I.P.s
  - 25 September
    - Dementia 13
    - Thunder Island
  - 29 September
    - Tom Jones

=== October–December ===
- October 1963
  - 1 October
    - Lilies of the Field
  - 10 October
    - From Russia with Love (United Kingdom/United States)
  - 16 October
    - Twilight of Honor
  - 17 October
    - All the Way Home
  - 19 October
    - Johnny Cool
  - 23 October
    - Under the Yum Yum Tree
  - 24 October
    - Mary, Mary
  - 26 October
    - The Lost World of Sinbad (Japan)
  - 29 October
    - Cry of Battle
  - 30 October
    - A New Kind of Love
    - The Old Dark House
  - 31 October
    - The World Ten Times Over (United Kingdom)
- November 1963
  - 5 November
    - Palm Springs Weekend
  - 6 November
    - Gunfight at Comanche Creek
  - 7 November
    - Carry On Cabby (United Kingdom)
    - It's a Mad, Mad, Mad, Mad World
  - 13 November
    - The Skydivers
    - Sunday in New York
    - Take Her, She's Mine
  - 14 November
    - The Wheeler Dealers
  - 18 November
    - The Victors
  - 20 November
    - The Incredible Journey
  - 23 November
    - McLintock!
  - 27 November
    - Fun in Acapulco
    - Soldier in the Rain
  - 28 November
    - Who's Minding the Store?
- December 1963
  - 5 December
    - Charade
  - 13 December
    - The Cardinal
  - 15 December
    - America America
  - 18 December
    - The Ceremony
    - Kings of the Sun
    - The Pink Panther
    - Samson and the Slave Queen
  - 22 December
    - Atragon (Japan)
  - 23 December
    - Captain Newman, M.D.
    - Ladybug Ladybug
    - One Man's Way
  - 25 December
    - 4 for Texas
    - The Comedy of Terrors
    - Love with the Proper Stranger
    - Move Over, Darling
    - The Prize
    - The Sword in the Stone
    - Who's Been Sleeping in My Bed?
  - 26 December
    - Act One

== Notable films released in 1963 ==
United States except where noted..

=== # ===
- 13 Assassins (十三人の刺客, Jūsan-nin no shikaku), directed by Eiichi Kudo – (Japan)
- 13 Frightened Girls, directed and produced by William Castle
- 4 for Texas, starring Frank Sinatra, Dean Martin, Ursula Andress, Anita Ekberg
- 8½, directed by Federico Fellini, starring Marcello Mastroianni, Claudia Cardinale, Anouk Aimée -- Oscar for Best Foreign Language Film – (Italy)
- 55 Days at Peking, starring Charlton Heston, Ava Gardner, David Niven

=== A ===
- Les abysses, directed by Nikos Papatakis – (France)
- Act One, directed by Dore Schary and starring George Hamilton
- An Actor's Revenge (Yukinojō Henge), directed by Kon Ichikawa – (Japan)
- Al Nasser Salah Ad-Din (Saladin), directed by Youssef Chahine – (Egypt)
- All the Way Home, starring Jean Simmons, Robert Preston, Ronnie Claire Edwards
- Alone on the Pacific (Taiheiyo hitori-botchi), directed by Kon Ichikawa – (Japan)
- America, America (a.k.a. The Anatolian Smile) by Elia Kazan
- Any Number Can Win (Mélodie en sous-sol), starring Jean Gabin and Alain Delon – (France/Italy)
- Apache Gold (Winnetou – 1. Teil), directed by Harald Reinl – (West Germany/Italy/Yugoslavia)
- Atragon (Kaitei gunkan), directed by Ishirō Honda – (Japan)
- Attack Squadron! (太平洋の翼, Taiheiyō no Tsubasa), directed by Shue Matsubayashi – (Japan)

=== B ===
- The Bakery Girl of Monceau (La boulangère de Monceau), directed by Éric Rohmer, starring Barbet Schroeder – (France)
- The Balcony, starring Shelley Winters, Peter Falk and Leonard Nimoy
- Banana Peel (Peau de banane), starring Jeanne Moreau and Jean Paul Belmondo – (France/Italy/West Germany)
- Bandini (Imprisoned), directed by Bimal Roy, starring Ashok Kumar – (India)
- Barren Lives (Vidas Secas), directed by Nelson Pereira dos Santos – (Brazil)
- The Bastard (悪太郎, Akutarō), directed by Seijun Suzuki – (Japan)
- Bay of Angels (La Baie des Anges), directed by Jacques Demy, starring Jeanne Moreau – (France)
- Beach Party, directed by William Asher, starring Frankie Avalon, Annette Funicello, Bob Cummings, Dorothy Malone
- Bébo's Girl (La ragazza di Bube), starring Claudia Cardinale and George Chakiris – (Italy)
- The Big City (Mahanagar), directed by Satyajit Ray – (India)
- Billy Liar, directed by John Schlesinger, starring Tom Courtenay and Julie Christie – (U.K.)
- The Birds, directed by Alfred Hitchcock, starring Tippi Hedren, Rod Taylor, Suzanne Pleshette, Jessica Tandy
- Bitter Harvest, starring Janet Munro – (U.K.)
- The Black Abbot (Der Schwarze Abt), directed by Franz Josef Gottlieb – (West Germany)
- Black Sabbath (I tre volti della paura), starring Boris Karloff – (Italy/U.K./France)
- Blood Feast, directed by Herschell Gordon Lewis
- Bluebeard (Landru), directed by Claude Chabrol – (France/Italy)
- Il Boom, directed by Vittorio De Sica, starring Alberto Sordi – (Italy)
- Bushido, Samurai Saga, directed by Tadashi Imai (Bushidô zankoku monogatari) – (Japan)
- Bye Bye Birdie, starring Janet Leigh, Dick Van Dyke, Ann-Margret

=== C ===
- Call Me Bwana, directed by Gordon Douglas, starring Bob Hope, Anita Ekberg, Edie Adams
- Captain Newman, M.D., directed by David Miller, starring Gregory Peck, Tony Curtis, Bobby Darin, Eddie Albert, Angie Dickinson
- Captain Sindbad
- The Carabineers (Les Carabiniers), directed by Jean-Luc Godard – (France)
- Carbide and Sorrel (Karbid und Sauerampfer) – (East Germany)
- The Cardinal, directed by Otto Preminger, starring Tom Tryon, Carol Lynley, Romy Schneider, John Huston
- The Caretaker, starring Alan Bates and Robert Shaw – (U.K.)
- The Caretakers, starring Joan Crawford, Robert Stack, Polly Bergen
- Carom Shots (Carambolages), directed by Marcel Bluwal – (France)
- Carry On Cabby, starring Sid James and Hattie Jacques – (U.K.)
- The Cassandra Cat (Až přijde kocour) – (Czechoslovakia)
- The Ceremony, directed by Laurence Harvey
- Chair de poule (a.k.a. Highway Pickup), directed by Julien Duvivier – (France)
- Charade, directed by Stanley Donen, starring Cary Grant, Audrey Hepburn, Walter Matthau, George Kennedy, James Coburn
- A Child Is Waiting, starring Judy Garland and Burt Lancaster
- Cleopatra, starring Elizabeth Taylor, Rex Harrison, Richard Burton – (U.S./U.K./Switzerland)
- Codine, directed by Henri Colpi – (France/Romania)
- Come Blow Your Horn, starring Frank Sinatra, Tony Bill, Barbara Rush, Jill St. John
- Come Fly With Me, starring Pamela Tiffin, Lois Nettleton, Dolores Hart
- The Conjugal Bed (L'ape regina), starring Ugo Tognazzi – (Italy)
- Contempt (Le mépris), directed by Jean-Luc Godard, starring Brigitte Bardot, Jack Palance, Michel Piccoli – (France)
- The Cool World, directed by Shirley Clarke
- The Corrupt (Symphonie pour un massacre), directed by Jacques Deray
- The Courtship of Eddie's Father, directed by Vincente Minnelli, starring Glenn Ford, Shirley Jones, Stella Stevens, Dina Merrill, Ron Howard
- Crisis: Behind a Presidential Commitment, documentary film directed by Robert Drew
- Critic's Choice, starring Bob Hope and Lucille Ball
- Crooks in Clover (Les tontons flingueurs), starring Lino Ventura – (France/Italy/West Germany)
- The Cry (Křik) – (Czechoslovakia)

=== D ===
- The Damned, directed by Joseph Losey, starring Macdonald Carey – (U.K.)
- The Day and the Hour (Le jour et l'heure), directed by René Clément, starring Simone Signoret and Stuart Whitman – (France)
- The Day of the Triffids, starring Howard Keel – (U.K.)
- Dementia 13, directed by Francis Ford Coppola
- The Devil (Il diavolo), starring Alberto Sordi, Golden Bear winner – (Italy)
- Diamond Head, starring Charlton Heston, Yvette Mimieux, France Nuyen, George Chakiris, James Darren
- Diary of a Madman, starring Vincent Price, Nancy Kovack, Elaine Devry
- Dil Ek Mandir (The Heart Is a Temple) – (India)
- Donovan's Reef, directed by John Ford, starring John Wayne and Lee Marvin
- Drama of the Lark (Pacsirta) – (Hungary)

=== E ===
- El Dorado, directed by Menahem Golan, starring Topol – (Israel)
- Empress Wu Tse-Tien – (Hong Kong)
- The Empty Canvas (La noia), starring Bette Davis and Horst Buchholz – (Italy)
- The Engagement (I fidanzati), directed by Ermanno Olmi – (Italy)
- The Executioner (El Verdugo), directed by Luis García Berlanga, starring Nino Manfredi – (Spain)

=== F ===
- Father Came Too!, starring James Robertson Justice and Leslie Phillips – (U.K.)
- The Fiancés (I fidanzati), directed by Ermanno Olmi – (Italy)
- The Fire Within (Le feu follet), directed by Louis Malle – (France)
- Flaming Creatures, directed by Jack Smith
- Flipper, starring Chuck Connors and Luke Halpin
- Follow the Boys, starring Connie Francis, Paula Prentiss, Dany Robin, Janis Paige
- For Love or Money, starring Kirk Douglas and Mitzi Gaynor
- From Russia with Love, the second James Bond film, starring Sean Connery, Daniela Bianchi, Pedro Armendáriz, Robert Shaw, Lotte Lenya – (U.K./U.S.)
- Fun in Acapulco, starring Elvis Presley and Ursula Andress

=== G ===
- A Gathering of Eagles, starring Rock Hudson
- Gidget Goes to Rome, starring Cindy Carol
- The Girl Hunters, starring Mickey Spillane (as Mike Hammer), with Lloyd Nolan, Shirley Eaton
- The Girl Who Knew Too Much (La ragazza che sapeva troppo), directed by Mario Bava – (Italy)
- Le glaive et la balance (a.k.a. Two are Guilty), starring Anthony Perkins – (France/Italy)
- Gone Are the Days!, starring Ossie Davis, Ruby Dee and Godfrey Cambridge
- Goryeojang (고려장), written, produced and directed by Kim Ki-young – (South Korea)
- The Great Escape, directed by John Sturges, starring Steve McQueen, James Garner, Charles Bronson, Richard Attenborough, David McCallum, Donald Pleasence
- The Green Years (Os Verdes Anos) – (Portugal)

=== H ===
- Hallelujah the Hills, directed by Adolfas Mekas
- Hands over the City (Le mani sulla città), directed by Francesco Rosi, starring Rod Steiger – (Italy)
- The Haunted Palace, directed by Roger Corman, starring Vincent Price
- The Haunting, directed by Robert Wise, starring Julie Harris – (U.K.)
- Heaven Sent (Un drôle de paroissien), starring Bourvil – (France)
- Heavens Above!, directed by the Boulting brothers, starring Peter Sellers – (U.K.)
- High and Low (天国と地獄), directed by Akira Kurosawa, starring Toshiro Mifune – (Japan)
- The Hook, starring Kirk Douglas
- The Hours of Love (Le ore dell'amore), directed by Luciano Salce – (Italy)
- The Householder (Gharbar), directed by James Ivory, starring Shashi Kapoor and Leela Naidu – (India)
- How to Be Loved (Jak być kochaną), starring Zbigniew Cybulski – (Poland)
- Hud, directed by Martin Ritt, starring Paul Newman, Patricia Neal, Brandon deWilde, Melvyn Douglas

=== I ===
- I Could Go On Singing, starring Judy Garland and Dirk Bogarde – (U.K./U.S.)
- Ikarie XB-1 (Icarus XB-1) – (Czechoslovakia)
- L'immortelle (The Immortal) – (France/Turkey)
- In the Cool of the Day, starring Peter Finch, Jane Fonda, Angela Lansbury
- The Indian Scarf (Das indische Tuch), directed by Alfred Vohrer – (West Germany)
- The Incredible Journey
- The Insect Woman (Nippon konchūki), directed by Shohei Imamura - (Japan)
- Irma la Douce, directed by Billy Wilder, starring Jack Lemmon and Shirley MacLaine
- The Iron Maiden (a.k.a. Swinging Maiden), directed by Gerald Thomas and starring Michael Craig – (U.K.)
- Island of Love, starring Robert Preston and Walter Matthau
- It Happened at the World's Fair, starring Elvis Presley
- It's a Mad, Mad, Mad, Mad World, directed by Stanley Kramer, starring Spencer Tracy, Milton Berle, Phil Silvers, Sid Caesar, Jonathan Winters, Mickey Rooney, Buddy Hackett, Ethel Merman, Dorothy Provine, Edie Adams, Dick Shawn and many more
- It's All Happening (a.k.a. The Dream Maker), directed by Don Sharp – (U.K.)
- Ivan's Childhood (originally Ivanovo detstvo), directed by Andrei Tarkovsky, starring Nikolay Burlyaev, Valentin Zubkov, and Evgeniy Zharikov – (U.S.S.R.)

=== J ===
- Jason and the Argonauts, starring Todd Armstrong – (U.K./U.S.)
- Johnny Cool, starring Henry Silva and Elizabeth Montgomery
- Judex, directed by Georges Franju – (France)

=== K ===
- Kanto Wanderer (Kantō mushuku) – (Japan)
- Kings of the Sun, directed by J. Lee Thompson, starring Yul Brynner and George Chakiris
- Kiss of the Vampire, directed by Don Sharp

=== L ===
- Ladies Who Do, starring Harry H. Corbett, Robert Morley and Peggy Mount – (U.K.)
- Ladybug Ladybug, directed by Frank Perry
- The Leopard (Il Gattopardo), directed by Luchino Visconti, starring Burt Lancaster, Claudia Cardinale, Alain Delon – Palme d'Or winner – (Italy)
- Like Two Drops of Water (Als twee druppels water), directed by Fons Rademakers – (Netherlands)
- Lilies of the Field, directed by Ralph Nelson, starring Sidney Poitier
- The List of Adrian Messenger, directed by John Huston, starring George C. Scott
- The Little Soldier (Le petit soldat), directed by Jean-Luc Godard, starring Anna Karina – (France)
- Lord of the Flies, directed by Peter Brook – (U.K.)
- The Love Eterne (Liang Shan Bo yu Zhu Ying Tai) – (Hong Kong)
- Love Is a Ball, starring Glenn Ford, Hope Lange, Charles Boyer, Ricardo Montalbán
- Love with the Proper Stranger, starring Natalie Wood and Steve McQueen

=== M ===
- The Mad Executioners (Der Henker von London), directed by Edwin Zbonek – (West Germany)
- Maigret Sees Red (Maigret voit rouge), starring Jean Gabin – (France/Italy)
- The Man from the Diner's Club, directed by Frank Tashlin, starring Danny Kaye
- Maniac, directed by Michael Carreras
- Mary, Mary, starring Debbie Reynolds, Diane McBain and Barry Nelson
- Matango (a.k.a. Attack of the Mushroom People), directed by Ishirō Honda – (Japan)
- Mathias Sandorf, directed by Georges Lampin – (Italy/France/Spain)
- A Matter of Choice, directed by Vernon Sewell, starring Anthony Steel – (U.K.)
- McLintock!, starring John Wayne and Maureen O'Hara
- The Mind Benders, starring Dirk Bogarde and Mary Ure – (U.K.)
- Miracle of the White Stallions, starring Robert Taylor, Lilli Palmer, Eddie Albert
- Monstrosity (a.k.a. The Atomic Brain), directed by Joseph V. Mascelli
- Mother of the Bride (Omm el aroussa) – (Egypt)
- The Mouse on the Moon, directed by Richard Lester – (U.K.)
- Move Over, Darling, starring Doris Day, James Garner, Polly Bergen, Chuck Connors
- Mujhe Jeene Do (Let Me Live), starring Sunil Dutt – (India)
- Murder at the Gallop (1963), a Miss Marple film directed by George Pollock – (U.K./U.S.)
- Muriel (a.k.a. Muriel ou le Temps d'un retour), directed by Alain Resnais, starring Delphine Seyrig – (France)
- My Six Loves, starring Debbie Reynolds, Cliff Robertson, David Janssen

=== N ===
- Naked Among Wolves (Nackt unter Wölfen) – (East Germany)
- Nartanasala, starring N. T. Rama Rao and Savitri – (India)
- A New Kind of Love, starring Paul Newman and Joanne Woodward
- New Tale of Zatoichi (新・座頭市物語, Shin Zatoichi monogatari), third film of the Zatoichi trilogy – (Japan)
- Nine Hours to Rama, directed by Mark Robson, starring Horst Buchholz, Diane Baker, José Ferrer – (U.K./U.S.)
- Not on Your Life (El Verdugo), directed by Luis García Berlanga, starring Nino Manfredi – (Spain)
- Nunca pasa nada (Nothing Ever Happens), directed by Juan Antonio Bardem – (Spain)
- Nurse on Wheels, directed by Gerald Thomas – (U.K.)
- Nutty, Naughty Chateau (Château en suède), directed by Roger Vadim – (France/Spain)
- The Nutty Professor, directed by and starring Jerry Lewis, with Stella Stevens

=== O ===
- The Old Dark House, directed by William Castle – (U.K./U.S.)
- One Man's Way, directed by Denis Sanders and starring Don Murray
- Operation Bikini, starring Tab Hunter, Frankie Avalon, Gary Crosby
- Ophélia, directed by Claude Chabrol – (France)
- Opiate '67 (I mostri), directed by Dino Risi – (Italy)
- Optimistic Tragedy (Оптимистическая трагедия), directed by Samson Samsonov – (U.S.S.R.)
- The Organizer (I compagni), directed by Mario Monicelli, starring Marcello Mastroianni – (Italy)

=== P ===
- PT 109, starring Cliff Robertson as John F. Kennedy
- Papa's Delicate Condition, starring Jackie Gleason
- The Paper Man (El hombre de papel) – (Mexico)
- Paranoiac, starring Janette Scott and Oliver Reed – (U.K.)
- Passenger (Pasażerka) – (Poland)
- The Pink Panther, directed by Blake Edwards, starring David Niven, Peter Sellers, Robert Wagner, Capucine
- Pour la suite du monde (For Those Who Will Follow) – (Canada)
- The Prize, starring Paul Newman and Elke Sommer
- Promises! Promises!, starring Jayne Mansfield
- The Punch and Judy Man, starring Tony Hancock – (U.K.)

=== R ===
- Rampage, starring Robert Mitchum and Elsa Martinelli
- The Raven, directed by Roger Corman, starring Vincent Price, Peter Lorre, Boris Karloff
- Raven's End (Kvarteret Korpen), directed by Bo Widerberg – (Sweden)
- The Red Lanterns (Ta Kokkina fanaria) – (Greece)
- The Running Man, directed by Carol Reed, starring Laurence Harvey, Alan Bates, Lee Remick – (U.K.)

=== S ===
- The Sadist (a.k.a. Profile of Terror or Sweet Baby Charlie), directed by James Landis
- Sammy Going South (released in the U.S. as A Boy Ten Feet Tall), directed by Alexander Mackendrick – (U.K.)
- Savage Sam, a sequel to Old Yeller directed by Norman Tokar
- The Scarecrow of Romney Marsh, directed by James Neilson
- The Scarlet Blade (released in the U.S. as The Crimson Blade), directed by John Gilling – (U.K.)
- Scum of the Earth!, directed by Herschell Gordon Lewis
- The Servant, directed by Joseph Losey, starring Dirk Bogarde, Sarah Miles, James Fox – (U.K.)
- Shock Corridor, directed by Samuel Fuller, starring Peter Breck and Constance Towers
- Showdown, starring Audie Murphy
- The Silence (Tystnaden), written and directed by Ingmar Bergman – (Sweden)
- The Small World of Sammy Lee, written and directed by Ken Hughes – (U.K.)
- Soft Hands, directed by Mahmoud Zulfikar – (Egypt)
- Sodom and Gomorrah, starring Stewart Granger, Anouk Aimée, Pier Angeli
- Soldier in the Rain, starring Steve McQueen and Jackie Gleason
- Son of Flubber, starring Fred MacMurray
- Sparrows Can't Sing, starring Barbara Windsor and Roy Kinnear – (U.K.)
- Spencer's Mountain, starring Henry Fonda and Maureen O'Hara
- The Squeaker (Der Zinker), directed by Alfred Vohrer – (West Germany/France)
- Station Six-Sahara, directed by Seth Holt – (U.K./West Germany)
- The Stripper, starring Joanne Woodward, Richard Beymer, Claire Trevor, Gypsy Rose Lee
- Stolen Hours, starring Susan Hayward and Diane Baker
- The Success (Il successo), starring Vittorio Gassman and Jean-Louis Trintignant – (Italy)
- Summer Holiday, starring Cliff Richard, Lauri Peters and The Shadows – (U.K.)
- Summer Magic, starring Dorothy McGuire, Hayley Mills, Deborah Walley
- Sunday in New York, starring Jane Fonda, Rod Taylor, Cliff Robertson, Robert Culp
- Sunshine in a Net (Slnko v sieti) – (Czechoslovakia)
- Suzanne's Career (La carrière de Suzanne), directed by Éric Rohmer – (France)
- Sweet and Sour (Dragées au poivre), directed by Jacques Baratier – (Italy/France)
- Sweet Skin (Strip-tease), directed by Jacques Poitrenaud – (Italy/France)
- The Sword in the Stone, an animated Disney film

=== T ===
- Taj Mahal – (India)
- Take Her, She's Mine, starring James Stewart, Sandra Dee and Audrey Meadows
- Take It All (À tout prendre, a.k.a. All Things Considered) directed by Claude Jutra – (Canada)
- Tammy and the Doctor, starring Sandra Dee and Peter Fonda
- Los Tarantos, directed by Francisco Rovira Beleta – (Spain)
- Tarzan's Three Challenges, starring Jock Mahoney – (U.K./U.S.)
- The Terror, produced and directed by Roger Corman
- That Kind of Girl, directed by Gerry O'Hara – (U.K.)
- This Sporting Life, directed by Lindsay Anderson, starring Richard Harris and Rachel Roberts – (U.K.)
- The Three Stooges Go Around the World in a Daze, starring the Three Stooges
- The Thrill of It All, directed by Norman Jewison, starring Doris Day and James Garner
- A Ticklish Affair, directed by George Sidney, starring Shirley Jones and Gig Young
- To Beep or Not to Beep, written and directed by Chuck Jones, starring Wile E. Coyote and The Road runner
- To Die in Madrid (Mourir à Madrid), a documentary film directed by Frédéric Rossif – (France)
- Tom Jones, directed by Tony Richardson, starring Albert Finney and Susannah York (U.K.)
- Torpedo Bay, starring James Mason and Lilli Palmer – (Italy/France)
- Toys in the Attic, directed by George Roy Hill, starring Dean Martin, Geraldine Page and Yvette Mimieux
- Twice-Told Tales, starring Vincent Price
- Twilight of Honor, starring Richard Chamberlain

=== U ===
- The Ugly American, starring Marlon Brando
- Uncle Vanya, starring Michael Redgrave, Laurence Olivier, Joan Plowright – (U.K.)
- Under the Yum Yum Tree, starring Jack Lemmon, Dean Jones, Carol Lynley, Edie Adams

=== V ===
- Vice and Virtue (Le vice et la vertu), starring Annie Girardot, Robert Hossein and Catherine Deneuve – (France)
- The Victors, starring George Peppard, George Hamilton, Vince Edwards, Romy Schneider, Jeanne Moreau – (U.K.)
- La visita (The Visitor), starring Sandra Milo – (Italy)
- The V.I.P.s, starring Elizabeth Taylor, Richard Burton, Rod Taylor, Maggie Smith, Louis Jourdan, Margaret Rutherford, Orson Welles – (U.K.)
- Voyage to the End of the Universe (Ikarie XB-1), directed by Jindřich Polák – (Czechoslovakia)

=== W ===
- Walking the Streets of Moscow (Ya shagayu po Moskve) – (U.S.S.R.)
- Wall of Noise, directed by Richard Wilson and starring Suzanne Pleshette and Ty Hardin
- What a Crazy World, directed by Michael Carreras – (U.K.)
- What's a Nice Girl Like You Doing in a Place Like This?, a short film directed by Martin Scorsese
- The Wheeler Dealers, starring James Garner and Lee Remick
- The Whip and the Body (La frusta e il corpo), directed by Mario Bava under the alias "John M. Old"
- Who's Been Sleeping in My Bed?, starring Dean Martin, Carol Burnett, Elizabeth Montgomery, Jill St. John
- Who's Minding the Store?, starring Jerry Lewis, Agnes Moorehead, Jill St. John
- Winter Light (Nattvardsgästerna), directed by Ingmar Bergman – (Sweden)
- Wives and Lovers, starring Janet Leigh, Shelley Winters, Martha Hyer
- Women of the World (La donna nel mondo), directed by Gualtiero Jacopetti, Paolo Cavara and Franco Prosperi – (Italy)
- The Wrong Arm of the Law, starring Peter Sellers – (U.K.)

=== X ===
- X: The Man with the X-ray Eyes, directed by Roger Corman, starring Ray Milland

=== Y ===
- The Yellow Canary, starring Pat Boone
- Yesterday, Today and Tomorrow (Ieri, oggi, domani), directed by Vittorio De Sica, starring Sophia Loren and Marcello Mastroianni – Academy Award for Best Foreign Language Film – (Italy)
- Yoso, directed by Teinosuke Kinugasa – (Japan)
- Young Aphrodites (Mikres Afrodites) – (Greece)
- Youth of the Beast (Yajū no seishun), directed by Seijun Suzuki – (Japan)

=== Z ===
- Zatoichi on the Road (座頭市喧嘩旅, Zatōichi kenka-tabi), directed by Kimiyoshi Yasuda – (Japan)
- Zatoichi the Fugitive (座頭市兇状旅, Zatōichi Kyōjō tabi), directed by Tokuzō Tanaka – (Japan)

== Short film series ==
- Looney Tunes (1930–1969)
- Terrytoons (1930–1964)
- Merrie Melodies (1931–1969)
- Yosemite Sam (1945-1963)
- Speedy Gonzales (1953–1968)

== Births ==
- January 3 - Rebecca Broussard, American former actress
- January 4 - Dave Foley, Canadian actor and comedian
- January 5 - Jiang Wen, Chinese actor, screenwriter and director
- January 6
  - Tony Halme, Finnish actor and singer (d. 2010)
  - Nathalie Richard, French actress
- January 7 - Robert Petkoff, American actor
- January 14
  - Adjoa Andoh, British actress
  - Steven Soderbergh, American director
- January 16 - Mark Kiely, American actor
- January 17 - Tan Kheng Hua, Singaporean actress
- January 19 - Veanne Cox, American actress
- January 20
  - Ingeborga Dapkūnaitė, Lithuanian-Russian-British actress
  - James Denton, American actor
- January 22 - Nicola Duffett, English actress
- January 26 - Chin Siu-ho, Hong Kong actor
- January 31 - Tonio Arango, German actor
- February 3 - Kirk Baily, American actor (d. 2022)
- February 4 - Cheung Siu-fai, Hong Kong actor
- February 9 - Peter Rowsthorn, Australian stand-up comedian, actor, writer and producer
- February 10 - Philip Glenister, English actor
- February 12
  - Brian Haley, American actor and comedian
  - John Michael Higgins, American actor
- February 13 - Barry Tubb, American actor and director
- February 14 - Enrico Colantoni, Canadian actor and director
- February 15 - Wallace Wolodarsky, American screenwriter, producer, director and actor
- February 16 - Faran Tahir, Pakistani-American actor
- February 17
  - Michael Jordan, US basketball player and occasional actor
  - Larry the Cable Guy, American stand-up comedian, actor, producer, singer and radio personality
- February 19
  - Joey Diaz, Cuban-American stand-up comedian and actor
  - Jessica Tuck, American actress
- February 21 - William Baldwin, American actor
- February 22 - Peggy Lu, American actress
- February 24 - Geoff Bell, English actor
- February 26 - Chase Masterson, American actress and singer
- March 1
  - Maurice Benard, American actor
  - Russell Wong, American actor
- March 4 - Daniel Roebuck, American actor and writer
- March 7
  - Carlos Bardem, Spanish actor and writer
  - Bill Brochtrup, American actor
- March 9 - Jean-Marc Vallée, Canadian filmmaker and screenwriter (d. 2021)
- March 11
  - Fernando Guillén Cuervo, Spanish actor, filmmaker and screenwriter
  - Alex Kingston, English actress
- March 12 - Jake Weber, English actor
- March 16 - Rick Holmes, American actor
- March 17 - James Larkin, British actor
- March 18 - Vanessa L. Williams, actress, singer and beauty queen
- March 19
  - Neil LaBute, American director and screenwriter
  - Geoffrey Lower, American actor
  - Stuart McQuarrie, Scottish actor
  - Mary Scheer, American actress, comedian, screenwriter and producer
- March 20
  - Gregg Binkley, American actor
  - Kathy Ireland, American model and actress
  - Ofer Samra, American artist and actor
  - David Thewlis, English actor
- March 22 - Francesco Quinn, Italian-born American actor (d. 2011)
- March 27 - Quentin Tarantino, director
- April 2 - Tim Hodge, American voice actor, story artist, writer, animator, comedian and director
- April 4
  - Graham Norton, Irish actor, comedian, commentator and presenter
  - Anthony Clark, American actor and comedian (d. 2026)
- April 8 - Dean Norris, American actor
- April 15 - Paula Pell, American writer, producer and actress
- April 17 - Joel Murray, actor
- April 18
  - Conan O'Brien, television entertainer and talk show host
  - Eric McCormack, Canadian-American actor
- April 19 - Thomas Mills Wood, American actor
- April 20 - Tim Maculan, American actor
- April 21 - Erik King, American actor
- April 26 - Jet Li, Singaporean actor
- April 27 - Yammie Lam, Hong Kong actress (d. 2018)
- April 30 - James Marsh, British director
- May 8 - Michel Gondry, French filmmaker and producer
- May 9 - Gary Daniels, English actor, producer, martial artist and fight coordinator
- May 10 - Rich Moore, American director, screenwriter and voice actor
- May 11 - Natasha Richardson, actress (d. 2009)
- May 12
  - Gavin Hood, South African filmmaker and actor
  - Rob Moran, American actor and producer
  - John Schultz, American director, screenwriter and producer
- May 15
  - Brenda Bakke, American actress
  - Jamie Harris, British actor
  - Grant Heslov, American actor and filmmaker
- May 16 - Marina Massironi, Italian actress
- May 22
  - Chris Pedersen, American actor
  - David Schneider, British comedian, actor and director
  - Cle Shaheed Sloan, American actor and documentary director
- May 25 - Mike Myers, Canadian actor
- May 26 - Joe Chrest, American actor
- May 30 - Cynthia Gouw, American actress
- June 1
  - Brian Goodman, American director, writer and actor
  - David Rudman, American puppeteer, writer, director and producer
- June 6 - Jason Isaacs, English actor
- June 9 - Johnny Depp, American actor
- June 10
  - Teresa Cheung Siu-wai, Canadian actress and producer
  - Jeanne Tripplehorn, American actress
- June 12
  - Isabelle Candelier, French actress
  - Tim DeKay, actor & producer
  - Patrice Martinez, American actress (d. 2018)
- June 15 - Helen Hunt, American actress and director
- June 17 - Greg Kinnear, American actor, producer and television personality
- June 22
  - Randy Couture, American actor
  - Heidi Kozak, Danish-American actress
- June 25
  - John Benjamin Hickey, American actor
  - Jackie Swanson, American actress
- June 27 - David Drake, American actor
- June 29 - Judith Hoag, American actress
- June 30 - Rupert Graves, English actor
- July 2 - Mark Kermode, English critic
- July 4
  - Raman Hui, Hong Kong animator, director and producer
  - Monty Montgomery, American producer, director, actor and screenwriter
- July 5 - Edie Falco, American actress
- July 7 - Robert Taylor, Australian actor
- July 8
  - Rocky Carroll, American actor and director
  - Michael Cuesta, American director
- July 13 - Sandy Fox, American voice actress
- July 15
  - Brigitte Nielsen, Danish actress and singer
  - Joy Smithers, Australian actress
- July 16
  - Phoebe Cates, American former actress
  - Paul Hipp, American actor, singer-songwriter and filmmaker
- July 17
  - Stephen Tredre, English actor and writer (d. 1997)
  - John Ventimiglia, American actor
- July 18 - Jeff Burr, American director, writer and producer (d. 2023)
- July 19 - Bettina Kupfer, German actress
- July 20 - Frank Whaley, American actor, director, screenwriter and comedian
- July 21 - Kelly Hunter, British actress
- July 22 - Joanna Going, American actress
- July 27 - Donnie Yen, Hong Kong actor
- July 29 - Alexandra Paul, American actress
- July 30 - Lisa Kudrow, American actress
- July 31 - Larry Romano, American actor
- August 1
  - Demián Bichir, Mexican-American actor
  - John Carroll Lynch, American character actor and director
  - Coolio, American rapper and actor (d. 2022)
- August 2 - Igor Khait, American animator (d. 2016)
- August 3
  - Lisa Ann Walter, American actress, comedian and producer
  - Isaiah Washington, American actor
- August 5 - Mark Strong, English actor
- August 7
  - Ramon Estevez, American actor and director
  - Harold Perrineau, American actor
- August 8
  - Rika Fukami, Japanese voice actress and narrator
  - Emi Shinohara, Japanese voice actress (d. 2024)
  - Jon Turteltaub, American filmmaker
- August 9 - Whitney Houston, American actress, producer and singer (d. 2012)
- August 13 - Sridevi, Indian actress (d. 2018)
- August 14 - Emmanuelle Béart, French actress
- August 15 - Alejandro González Iñárritu, Mexican filmmaker
- August 16 - Christine Cavanaugh, American actress (d. 2014)
- August 19
  - Darcy DeMoss, American actress
  - Matthew Glave, American actor
  - John Stamos, American actor and musician
- August 20 - Justina Vail Evans, British actress
- August 23 - Ed Gale, American actor and stunt performer (d. 2025)
- August 24 - Hideo Kojima, Japanese video game designer, director, producer, and writer
- August 28 - Peter Mygind, Danish actor
- August 29 - Karl Markovics, Austrian actor and director
- August 30 - Michael Chiklis, American actor, director and producer
- September 3
  - Serena Gordon, English actress
  - Holt McCallany, American actor, producer and writer
- September 5 - Jonny Phillips, English actor
- September 7 - W. Earl Brown, American actor, screenwriter, producer and musician
- September 8
  - David Lee Smith, American actor
  - Brad Silberling, American director
  - Betsy Russell, American actress
  - Larry Zerner, American actor
- September 10 - Sean O'Bryan, American actor
- September 12 - Michael McElhatton, Irish actor and writer
- September 16 - Leslie Wing, American former actress
- September 17
  - Gian-Carlo Coppola, American producer and actor (d. 1986)
  - James Urbaniak, American character actor
- September 18 - Christopher Heyerdahl, Canadian actor
- September 19
  - Spencer Garrett, American actor
  - Dan Povenmire, animator and voice actor
- September 20
  - Ivan Heng, Singaporean actor
  - Robert LaSardo, American character actor
- September 21 - Angus Macfadyen, Scottish actor
- September 25
  - Tate Donovan, American actor and director
  - Mikael Persbrandt, Swedish actor
- September 27
  - Marc Maron, American stand-up comedian, podcaster, writer, actor, and musician
  - Brian Steele, American actor
  - Scott Lawrence, American actor
- October 1 - Beth Chamberlin, American actress
- October 6
  - Jsu Garcia, American actor and producer
  - Elisabeth Shue, American actress
- October 8 - David Yates, English director, producer and writer
- October 9 - Sheila Kelley, American actress
- October 12
  - Rami Heuberger, Israeli actor and director (d. 2025)
  - Dave Legeno, English actor (d. 2014)
- October 13 - Hiro Kanagawa, Japanese-Canadian actor
- October 14 - Lori Petty, American actress
- October 16 - Pamela Bach, American actress (d. 2025)
- October 23 - Allison Shearmur, American producer (d. 2018)
- October 26 - Ted Demme, American director, producer and actor (d. 2002)
- October 27 - Deborah Moore, English actress
- October 28 - Lauren Holly, American-Canadian actress
- October 29
  - Jed Brophy, New Zealand actor
  - Damian Chapa, American actor, director, screenwriter and producer
- October 30 - Michael Beach, American actor
- October 31
  - Sanjeev Bhaskar, British actor, comedian and television presenter
  - Dermot Mulroney, American actor
  - Rob Schneider, actor and comedian
- November 3 - Brian Henson, American puppeteer, director and director
- November 5 - Tatum O'Neal, American actress
- November 6 - Tsuyoshi Ihara, Japanese actor, martial artist and writer
- November 10
  - Hugh Bonneville, English actor
  - Tommy Davidson, American actor and comedian
- November 12 - Sam Lloyd, American actor and singer (d. 2020)
- November 15
  - Doreen Montalvo, American actress, singer and playwright (d. 2020)
  - Kevin J. O'Connor, American actor
- November 17
  - Perry Caravello, American actor and comedian
  - Dylan Walsh, American actor
- November 18 - Rich Fulcher, American comedian and actor
- November 19 - Angela Means, American comedian and actress
- November 20 - Ming-Na Wen, American actress
- November 22 - Ingvar Eggert Sigurðsson, Icelandic actor
- November 25
  - Kevin Chamberlin, American actor and singer
  - Eddie Jemison, American actor
- November 27
  - Vladimir Mashkov, Russian actor
  - Fisher Stevens, American actor
- December 5 - Carrie Hamilton, American actress and singer (d. 2002)
- December 6
  - Jens Hultén, Swedish actor
  - Matt Malloy, American actor
  - Ulrich Thomsen, Danish actor and filmmaker
- December 14 - Cynthia Gibb, American actress
- December 15 - Helen Slater, American actress
- December 16
  - Benjamin Bratt, American actor, producer and activist
  - James Mangold, American filmmaker
- December 18
  - Olivier Broche, French actor and producer
  - Brad Pitt, American actor
- December 19
  - Jennifer Beals, actress
  - Paul Rhys, Welsh actor
  - Til Schweiger, actor
- December 20
  - Joel Gretsch, American actor
  - Iqbal Theba, Pakistani actor
- December 23 - Jess Harnell, American voice actor and singer
- December 29 - Julian Bleach, English actor and singer
- December 31
  - Stefania Orsola Garello, Italian actress
  - Raugi Yu, Canadian actor

== Deaths ==
- January 1 – Filippo Del Giudice, 70, Italian film producer
- January 2
  - Dick Powell, 58, American actor, director, Murder, My Sweet, The Bad and the Beautiful
  - Jack Carson, 52, Canadian actor, Cat on a Hot Tin Roof, Mildred Pierce
- January 6 – Frank Tuttle, 70, American director, This Gun for Hire, Waikiki Wedding
- January 26 – Ole Olsen, 70, American actor and comedian, Hellzapoppin'
- January 28 – John Farrow, 58, Australian director, Hondo, The Big Clock
- February 2 – William Gaxton, 69, American actor and singer, Diamond Horseshoe, The Heat's On
- February 8 – George Dolenz, 55, Hungarian actor, Vendetta, My Cousin Rachel
- February 18 – Monte Blue, 76, American actor, Key Largo, White Shadows in the South Seas
- March 18 – Wanda Hawley, 67, American actress, The Young Rajah, The Midnight Message
- March 25 – Felix Adler, 79, American screenwriter, Saps at Sea, Block-Heads
- April 4 – Jason Robards Sr., 70, American actor, Mr. Blandings Builds His Dream House, Isle of the Dead
- April 30 – Bryant Washburn, 74, American actor, Sky Patrol, Adventures of Captain Marvel
- May 2 – Oscar A. C. Lund, 77, Swedish film actor, director, and writer
- May 6 – Monty Woolley, 74, American actor, The Bishop's Wife, The Man Who Came to Dinner
- May 17 – Daniel Mendaille, 77, French actor, On Trial, Napoléon
- May 19 – Luana Walters, 50, American actress, Mexicali Rose, The Corpse Vanishes
- July 1 - Ezz El-Dine Zulficar, Egyptian director and producer, The Second Man, The River of Love
- June 7 – ZaSu Pitts, 69, American actress, Greed, Life with Father
- June 18 – Pedro Armendáriz, 51, Mexican actor, The Fugitive, Fort Apache
- June 20 – Gordon Jones, 51, American actor, I Take This Oath, The Green Hornet
- July 10 – John Sutton, 54, Pakistani actor, The Three Musketeers, Captain from Castile
- July 25 – Leota Lane, 59, American singer, actress, Three Hollywood Girls
- August 4 – Tom Keene, 66, American actor, Our Daily Bread, Ghost Valley
- August 14 – Clifford Odets, 57, American playwright and screenwriter, Sweet Smell of Success, None but the Lonely Heart
- August 17 – Richard Barthelmess, 68, American actor, Broken Blossoms, Only Angels Have Wings
- August 23 – Mary Gordon, 81, Scottish actress, Smart Guy, Shamrock Hill
- August 25 – Edward L. Cahn, 64, American director, It! The Terror from Beyond Space, Girls in Prison
- September 4 – Byron Russell, 79, Irish actor, Mutiny on the Bounty, Parnell
- September 15 – Oliver Wallace, 76, English composer, Dumbo, Cinderella, Peter Pan
- October 8 –
  - Frank R. Adams, 80, American composer and screenwriter, Peg o' My Heart, The Cowboy and the Lady
  - Grace Darmond, 68, Canadian actress, What Every Woman Wants, The Hope Diamond Mystery
- October 11 – Jean Cocteau, 74, French director and screenwriter, Beauty and the Beast, Orpheus
- October 18 – Constance Worth, 52, Australian actress, China Passage, Meet Boston Blackie
- October 29 – Adolphe Menjou, 73, American actor, Paths of Glory, A Star is Born
- October 31
  - Henry Daniell, 69, British actor, Sherlock Holmes and the Voice of Terror, The Great Dictator
  - Hans Jacoby, 59, German screenwriter, Reunion in Reno, Champagne for Caesar
- November 1 – Elsa Maxwell, 82, American gossip columnist, Rhapsody in Blue, Stage Door Canteen
- November 15 - Paul Sloane, 70, American director, The Woman Accused, Down to Their Last Yacht
- November 25
  - Jean Brooks, 47, American actress, The Leopard Man, The Seventh Victim
  - Joseph Sweeney, 79, American actor, 12 Angry Men, The Man in the Grey Flannel Suit
- November 29 – Charles Schnee, 47, American screenwriter, The Bad and the Beautiful, Red River
- November 30
  - Phil Baker, 67, American comedian and actor, The Gang's All Here, Take It or Leave It
  - Gina Malo, 54, American actress, The Gang Show, All In
- December 2
  - Sabu, 39, Indian actor, Jungle Book, The Thief of Bagdad
  - Mario Zampi, 60, Italian director, The Naked Truth, Five Golden Hours
- December 4 – Robert Hamer, 52, British director, Kind Hearts and Coronets, Dead of Night
- December 5 – Tom London, 74, American actor, Calamity Jane, High Noon
- December 12
  - Yasujirō Ozu, 60, Japanese director and screenwriter, Tokyo Story, Late Spring
  - Barbara Read, 45, Canadian actress, Three Smart Girls, The Shadow Returns

== Film debuts ==
- Edward Albert – Miracle of the White Stallions
- Alan Alda – Gone are the Days!
- Tom Aldredge – The Mouse on the Moon
- Patrick Bauchau – Suzanne's Career
- Martine Beswick – From Russia with Love
- James Brolin – Take Her, She's Mine
- Genevieve Bujold – Amanita Pestilens
- Michael Byrne – The Scarlet Blade
- James Caan – Irma la Douce
- Robert Culp – PT 109
- Rosemary Dexter – Omicron
- Héctor Elizondo – The Fat Black Pussycat
- Antonio Fargas – The Cool World
- Louise Fletcher – A Gathering of Eagles
- Peter Fonda – Tammy and the Doctor
- Teri Garr – Fun in Acapulco
- George Gaynes – PT 109
- Henry Gibson – The Nutty Professor
- Julian Glover – Tom Jones
- Arlene Golonka – Love with the Proper Stranger
- Georgina Hale – The World Ten Times Over
- Richard Hamilton – Ladybug Ladybug
- Clint Howard – The Courtship of Eddie's Father
- David Huddleston – All the Way Home
- George Innes – Billy Liar
- Yaphet Kotto – 4 for Texas
- Jeroen Krabbé – Fietsen naar de Maan
- Christopher Lambert – Who's Minding the Store?
- Geoffrey Lewis – The Fat Black Pussycat
- Kenneth Mars – Act One
- Ottavia Piccolo – The Leopard
- Lynn Redgrave – Tom Jones
- Andy Romano – Beach Party
- Kurt Russell – It Happened at the World's Fair
- Joffre Soares – Vidas secas
- Andrew Stevens – The Courtship of Eddie's Father
- Philip Stone – Unearthly Stranger
- Donald Sutherland – The World Ten Times Over
- Dick Van Patten – Violent Midnight
- Robert Walker Jr. – The Hook
- Brook Williams – The V.I.P.s
- Edy Williams – For Love or Money
