= List of Spanish films of 1963 =

A list of films produced in Spain in 1963 (see 1963 in film).

== 1963 ==
Title	Director	Cast	Genre	Notes
1963
The Blancheville Monster	Alberto de Martino	Gérard Tichy, Leo Anchóriz, Ombretta Colli	Horror	Italian-Spanish co-production
Los inocentes	Juan Antonio Bardem	Alfredo Alcón, Paloma Valdés, Enrique Fava,	Drama	Entered into the 13th Berlin International Film Festival
Nunca pasa nada	Juan Antonio Bardem	Jean-Pierre Cassel	Drama	Co-production with France; Spanish & French languages
Rocío de La Mancha	Luis Lucia	Rocío Dúrcal, Carlos Estrada, Helga Liné	Musical	
Los Tarantos	Francisco Rovira Beleta	Carmen Amaya, Antonio Gades	Drama musical	Academy Award nominee; Gypsy version based on Romeo and Juliet
Del rosa al amarillo	Manuel Summers		Love	
El Verdugo	Luis García Berlanga	Nino Manfredi, Emma Penella, José Isbert	Black comedy	Voted as the Best Spanish film on most polls
A Nearly Decent Girl	Ladislao Vajda	Liselotte Pulver, Alberto de Mendoza, Martin Held	Comedy	Co-production with West Germany
New Friendship	Ramón Comas			Entered into the 3rd Moscow International Film Festival
