= List of horror films of 1963 =

A list of horror films released in 1963.

Title	Director	Cast	Country	Notes
The Birds	Alfred Hitchcock	Rod Taylor, Tippi Hedren, Jessica Tandy	United States	
Black Sabbath	Mario Bava	Boris Karloff, Michèle Mercier, Mark Damon	Italy; France	
Black Zoo	Robert Gordon	Michael Gough, Jeanne Cooper, Rod Lauren	United States	
The Blancheville Monster	Alberto De Martino	Gérard Tichy, Leo Anchóriz, Ombretta Colli	Italy; Spain	
Blood Feast	Herschell Gordon Lewis	William Kerwin, Mal Arnold, Connie Mason	United States	
The Comedy of Terrors	Jacques Tourneur	Vincent Price, Peter Lorre, Boris Karloff	United States	
Dementia 13	Francis Ford Coppola	William Campbell, Luana Anders, Bart Patton	United States	
The Demon	Brunello Rondi	Daliah Lavi, Frank Wolff, Nicola Tagliacozzo	Italy	
Diary of a Madman	Reginald LeBorg	Vincent Price, Nancy Kovack, Chris Warfield	United States	
The Eyes of Annie Jones	Reginald LeBorg	Richard Conte, Francesca Annis, Joyce Carey	United Kingdom	
The Ghost	Riccardo Freda	Barbara Steele, Peter Baldwin, Leonard Elliott	Italy	
The Haunted Palace	Roger Corman	Vincent Price, Debra Paget, Lon Chaney Jr.	United States	
The Haunting	Robert Wise	Julie Harris, Claire Bloom, Russ Tamblyn	United Kingdom; United States	
House of the Damned	Maury Dexter	Ron Foster, Merry Anders, Richard Crane, Erika Peters	United States	
House of Dreams	Robert Berry	Robert Berry, Pauline Elliott	United States	
Katarsis	Giuseppe Veggezzi	Christopher Lee	Italy	
Kiss of the Vampire	Don Sharp	Clifford Evans, Noel Willman, Edward de Souza	United Kingdom; United States	
Maniac	Michael Carreras	Kerwin Mathews, Nadia Gray, Donald Houston, Liliane Brousse	United Kingdom	
Matango	Ishirō Honda	Yoshio Tsuchiya, Akira Kubo, Hiroshi Koizumi	Japan	
The Old Dark House	William Castle	Tom Poston, Robert Morley, Janette Scott	United Kingdom; United States	
Paranoiac	Freddie Francis	Janette Scott, Oliver Reed, Sheila Burrell	United Kingdom; United States	
The Raven	Roger Corman	Vincent Price, Peter Lorre, Boris Karloff	United States	
Slime People	Robert Hutton	Robert Hutton, Les Tremayne, Robert Burton	United States	Science fiction horror
The Terror	Roger Corman	Jack Nicholson, Boris Karloff, Sandra Knight	United States	
Tomb of Torture	Antonio Boccacci	Annie Alberti, Adriano Micantoni, Marco Mariani	Italy	
Twice-Told Tales	Sidney Salkow	Vincent Price, Sebastian Cabot, Mari Blanchard	United States	
Unearthly Stranger	John Krish	John Neville, Philip Stone, Gabriella Licudi, Patrick Newell	United Kingdom	
The Virgin of Nuremberg	Antonio Margheriti	Christopher Lee, Georges Rivière, Rossana Podestà	Italy	
The Whip and the Body	Mario Bava	Christopher Lee, Daliah Lavi, Luciano Pigozzi	Italy; France	
