= Carmen Lozano =

Spanish actress

- Born: 1930; Spain
- Died: 2017 (aged 86–87)
- Occupation: Actress
- Years active: 1950-1995 (film & TV)

Carmen Lozano (1930–2017) was a Spanish television and film actress. She was the daughter of the actress Mercedes Muñoz Sampedro. Known as Carmen Lozano, María del Carmen Lozano Muñoz, died on February 19, 2017, in the Santo Angel Chapel in Murcia.

== Selected filmography ==
- Feather in the Wind (1952)
- Last Day (1952)
- Women's Town (1953)
- Alfonso XII and María Cristina (1960)
- Maribel and the Strange Family (1960)
- Camerino Without a Folding Screen (1967)
- Black Litter (1977)
- Spoiled Children (1980)

== Bibliography ==
- Peter Cowie & Derek Elley. World Filmography: 1967. Fairleigh Dickinson University Press, 1977.
