= The Blancheville Monster =

- Italian film poster
- Directed by: Alberto de Martino
- Written by: Gianni Grimaldi; Bruno Corbucci
- Starring: Gérard Tichy; Leo Anchóriz; Ombretta Colli
- Cinematography: Alejandro Ulloa
- Edited by: Otello Colangeli
- Music by: Carlo Franci; Giuseppe Piccillo
- Distributed by: Titanus (Italy)
- Release date: June 6, 1963 (Italy)
- Running time: 90 minutes
- Countries: Italy; Spain
- Box office: ₤87 million

The Blancheville Monster (Italian: Horror) is a 1963 horror film directed by Alberto de Martino. The film's script by Gianni Grimaldi and Bruno Corbucci is promoted as being based on the works of Edgar Allan Poe, but actually only borrows elements from the short stories "The Fall of the House of Usher", "A Tale of the Ragged Mountains" and "Some Words with a Mummy".

Long after its release, director Alberto de Martino described his film as "a little film of no importance".

== Plot ==
Emilie De Blancheville returns to her family's castle and finds drastic changes: her brother Roderic is now in charge of the estate; the servants have all died and been replaced by new staff members, who are cold and unfamiliar; and her father, Count Blancheville, has been horribly disfigured and now lives secluded in one of the castle's isolated towers. The Count believes the Blanchevilles are under a family curse, which can only be lifted if Emilie dies before her 21st birthday, five days away. When the Count escapes from the tower, Emily realizes her life is in danger.

== Cast ==
- Gérard Tichy as Rodéric De Blancheville
- Leo Anchóriz as Doctor LaRouche
- Ombretta Colli (as Joan Hills) as Emilie De Blancheville
- Helga Liné as Miss Eleanore
- Irán Eory as Alice Taylor
- Vanni Materassi (as Richard Davis) as John Taylor
- Paco Morán (as Frank Moran) as Alistair

== Production ==
Spanish sources for the production credit Natividad Zaro as a contributor to the script. As with many European co-productions of the era, this was done for tax reasons. Italian promotional material for the film promoted it as a product based on an Edgar Allan Poe story, but the film only borrows elements from "The Fall of the House of Usher", "A Tale of the Ragged Mountains" and "Some Words with a Mummy". The film's style is closer to that of a Roger Corman film rather than the Italian gothic horror films of era. Director Alberto de Martino felt he was more inspired by Alfred Hitchcock.

The film was shot at Monastery of Santa Maria La Real de Valdeiglesias in Spain and at Cinecittà in Rome.

== Release ==
The Blancheville Monster was released in Italy on June 6, 1963 through Titanus. It was released in Italy under the title Horror as chosen by producer Italo Zingarelli. The film grossed 87 million Italian lira on its initial theatrical run in Italy.

The film is in public domain in the United States. It was released on DVD by various home video companies in the 2000s and beyond. These range from Alpha Video in 2004, Mill Creek Entertainment in 2005 and Retro Media in 2013. Arrow Video would release the film on a blu-ray boxset along with three other gothic films in October 18, 2022.

== Reception ==
Alberto de Martino referred to his own film as "a little film of no importance" and that the only thing he found memorable was the mask used in the film, which was sculpted by his father. Roberto Curti, author of Italian Gothic Horror Films, 1957-1969 (2015) stated that the film "does not have much to offer" outside de Martino's competent directing and Alejandro Ulloa's lighting. Curti also noted the plot's cliches and mediocre acting. Bartłomiej Paszylk, author of The Pleasure and Pain of Cult Horror Films referred to the film as one of the brighter moments of Alberto de Martino's career and that "neither the overacting nor the many flaws of the script can take away the pleasure of watching The Blancheville Monster".

== See also ==
- List of horror films of 1963
- List of Italian films of 1963
- List of Spanish films of 1963
