= Cave of the Living Dead =

1964 film

- Directed by: Ákos Ráthonyi
- Written by: Kurt Roecken
- Starring: Adrian Hoven; Erika Remberg
- Release date: 10 April 1964
- Running time: 1h 27min
- Countries: West Germany; Yugoslavia
- Language: German

Cave of the Living Dead (German: Der Fluch der grünen Augen) is a 1964 German / Yugoslav horror film directed by Ákos Ráthonyi. The film was released as a double feature with Tomb of Torture in the US in 1966.

== Plot ==
The local police in a sleepy mountain village in the Balkans are left at a loss after seven murders of women. Therefore, Interpol is asked to send an expert. His name is Inspector Frank Doren and he's an American. Doren finds that every time the power goes out in the village, a girl dies. After that, the corpses disappear. As soon as he arrived, the electricity went out again; even Doren's car won't start anymore. This time Maria is the victim, the cook at the inn where he is staying. Despite his attempts to disguise himself as a tourist, the entire village community soon knows that Doren was sent by Interpol, which doesn't make his job any easier.

Doren continues his investigations, several more or less bizarre inhabitants are suspicious: for example the innkeeper who tried to force himself on Maria the night before the last murder, or the obscure village doctor who after every post-mortem examination despite clear bite wounds at the young women's throats, stereotypically insists on his heart failure diagnosis. Even the deaf, dumb Thomas is quite nocturnal in an unseemly way, and an old fortune teller babbles about alleged vampires who are supposed to be roaming the area. They all have one thing in common: they are afraid of an ominous grotto near the village.

The village community is also very afraid of the mysterious Professor von Adelsberg, who is said to be working on a scientific study on the subject of "blood" at his high castle. At his service is the young, pretty assistant Karin Schumann. It doesn't take Frank Doren long to find out that the cultivated yet uncanny nobleman is behind the mysterious events. Doren quickly takes a liking to the professor's assistant and they both fall in love. He soon realizes that Karin is in great danger, as her boss is the wanted vampire who has the dead women on his conscience. With the help of Adelsberg's black servant John, they can locate the vampire's coffin in the stalactite cave below the castle. There he made the seven allegedly murdered women docile as undead vampires. Before the undead fiend can rise again for a new bloody deed, Doren impales him with a wooden stake. Adelsberg's decomposing body bursts into flames in a small explosion.

== Cast ==
- Adrian Hoven - Insp. Frank Dorin
- Erika Remberg - Maria, the Professor's Assistant
- Carl Möhner - The Village Doctor
- Wolfgang Preiss - Prof. von Adelsberg
- Karin Field - Karin Schumann
  - Field's dialogue was dubbed by Marisa Mell.
- Emmerich Schrenk - Thomas - the Deaf One
- John Kitzmiller - John - Black Servant
  - Kitzmiller's dialogue was dubbed by Kurt E. Ludwig.
