= Camerino Without a Folding Screen =

- Directed by: José María Zabalza
- Written by: José María Zabalza (play)
- Produced by: Carlos Serrano Tell
- Cinematography: Emilio Foriscot
- Edited by: Francisco García Velázquez
- Music by: Fernando García Morcillo
- Production company: DISCENTRO
- Distributed by: Uranzu Films
- Release date: 3 July 1967
- Running time: 84 minutes
- Country: Spain
- Language: Spanish

Camerino Without a Folding Screen (Spanish:Camerino sin biombo) is a 1967 Spanish drama film directed by José María Zabalza and starring Paloma Valdés, Gemma Cuervo and Carmen Lozano. It portrays the lives of three women who work in a rough nightclub.

== Cast ==
- Blaki
- Germán Cobos
- Gemma Cuervo
- E. Escalante
- Antonio Escales
- Carmen Lozano
- Manuel Manzaneque as Narrator
- A. Uruñuela
- Paloma Valdés

== Bibliography ==
- Peter Cowie & Derek Elley. World Filmography: 1967. Fairleigh Dickinson University Press, 1977.
