= Ubaldo Terzano =

Italian cinematographer and camera operator

Ubaldo Terzano is an Italian cinematographer and camera operator, possibly best known for his numerous collaborations with Mario Bava.

As a cinematographer, his film credits include Bava's Black Sabbath (1963), The Whip and the Body (1963), and Blood and Black Lace (1964).

Terzano and Bava reputedly had a falling out in 1964. Mario Bava biographer has stated in his audio commentary that Terzano refused to be interviewed.

As a camera operator, he worked on such films as Bava's Black Sunday (1960), Elio Petri's Investigation of a Citizen Above Suspicion (1970), Lucio Fulci's A Lizard in a Woman's Skin (1971), Paul Morrissey's Flesh for Frankenstein (1973) and Blood for Dracula (1974), and Dario Argento's Deep Red (1975), among many other titles.
