= Slave Girls of Sheba =

- Directed by: Giacomo Gentilomo; Guido Zurli
- Screenplay by: Adriano Bolzoni; Umberto Lenzi; Sergio Leone; Amedeo Marrosu; Guido Zurli
- Story by: Umberto Lenzi
- Starring: Jose Suarez; Linda Cristal; Cristina Gajoni
- Cinematography: Luciano Trasatti; Franco Villa
- Edited by: Otello Colangeli
- Production company: Italia Produzione; Dubrava Film
- Distributed by: Variety Distribution
- Release date: 24 May 1963 (Italy)
- Running time: 100 minutes
- Countries: Italy; Yugoslavia

Slave Girls of Sheba (Italian: Le verdi bandiere di Allah, lit. 'The Green Flag of Allah') is a 1963 adventure film directed by Giacomo Gentilomo and Guido Zurli.

== Cast ==
- José Suárez: Omar
- Linda Cristal: Olivia
- Cristina Gajoni: Ursula
- Mimmo Palmara: Hibrahim
- Hélène Chanel: Harem Girl
- Vittorio Sanipoli: Sheik Selim
- José Jaspe: Friar
- Walter Barnes

== Release ==
Slave Girls of Sheba was released in Italy on May 24, 1963.

== See also ==
- List of Italian films of 1963
