= Tomb of Torture =

- Directed by: Antonio Boccacci
- Screenplay by: Anthony Kristye; Giovanni Simonelli
- Story by: Anthony Kristye
- Produced by: Francesco Campitelli
- Starring: Annie Alberti; Adriano Micantoni; Marco Mariani; Flora Carosello
- Cinematography: Francesco Campitelli
- Music by: Armando Sciascia
- Production company: Virginia Cinematografica
- Distributed by: Filmar
- Release date: 27 March 1963 (Italy)
- Running time: 88 minutes
- Country: Italy

Tomb of Torture (Italian: Metempsyco) is a 1963 Italian gothic horror film. It was the only film directed by Antonio Boccacci.

== Plot ==
A woman is tormented by dreams that she is the reincarnation of a dead countess. Her father, trying to get her to stop the dreams, takes her to a village near the castle of the late countess. In the village, she meets a reporter who is investigating reports of the deaths of two young women who it is believed were killed by a creature that lives in the castle.

== Production ==
Tomb of Torture was the only film directed by Antonio Boccacci. Prior to making the film, Boccacci wrote cheap paperback mystery novels in the late 1950s. The film was shot in Castle Orsini in Nerola near Rome. The cast included Annie Alberti who was a minor photonovel star in the early 1960s.

== Release ==
Tomb of Torture was released in Italy on 27 March 1963 where it was distributed by Filmar. Italian film historian and critic Roberto Curti stated that the film passed totally unnoticed in Italy where the "box office takings were so scarce that there is no actual record of them."

The film was picked up for distribution in the United States by Richard Gordon and was released by Trans-Lux Distributing on a double bill with the German vampire film Cave of the Living Dead. Tomb of Torture was later purchased by Four Star for television releases. The film has been released by Image Entertainment on DVD in the United States.

== Reception ==
In retrospective reviews, Bryan Senn discussed the film in his book A Year of Fear, stating that the film as a "deadly dull Italian snoozefest" that has none of "atmospheric charm or thematic richness" that Cave of the Living Dead had. Louis Paul, in his book Italian Horror Film Directors described the film as obscure and noted it was "photographed in an almost experimental style, which includes a concentration on a lot of sepiatoned colors" that tinted scenes in "bright blues and garish browns". Paul concluded the film to be "more than just the mean-spirited horror movie that it appears to be" and the film "still remains an enigmatic footnote in the history of Italian horror."

== See also ==
- List of horror films of 1963
- List of Italian films of 1963
