= The Invincible Masked Rider =

- French-language poster
- Directed by: Umberto Lenzi
- Screenplay by: Gino De Santis; Umberto Lenzi; Guido Maletesta; Luciano Martino
- Based on: A novel by Johnston McCulley
- Produced by: Fortunato Misiano
- Starring: Pierre Brice; Daniele Vargas; Hélène Chanel; Massimo Serato
- Cinematography: Bitto Albertini; Augusto Tiezzi
- Edited by: Jolanda Benvenuti
- Music by: Angelino Francesco Lavagnino
- Production companies: Romana Film; Socete Nouvelle de Cinematographie
- Release date: 29 March 1963 (Italy)
- Running time: 96 minutes
- Countries: Italy; France

The Invincible Masked Rider (Italian: L'invincibile cavaliere mascherato) is a 1963 adventure film directed by Umberto Lenzi. It was based on a novel by Johnston McCulley. The film was released in the US as Terror of the Black Mask.

It starred Pierre Brice, Daniele Vargas and Helene Chanel.

== Cast ==
- Pierre Brice: Don Diego Morales
- Daniele Vargas: Don Luis
- Hélène Chanel: Carmencita
- Massimo Serato: Don Rodrigo
- Gisella Arden: Maria
- Aldo Bufi Landi: Francisco
- Carlo Latimer: Tabuca
- Nerio Bernardi: Don Gomez
- Romano Ghini: Maurilio
- Tullio Altamura: Dr. Bernarinis
- Guido Celano: Dr. Aguilera
- Nello Pazzafini: Alonzo

== Release ==
The Invincible Masked Rider was released theatrically in Italy on 29 March 1963. It received a release in the United States in July 1967.

== See also ==
- List of Italian films of 1963
