= Cristina Gajoni =

Italian actress

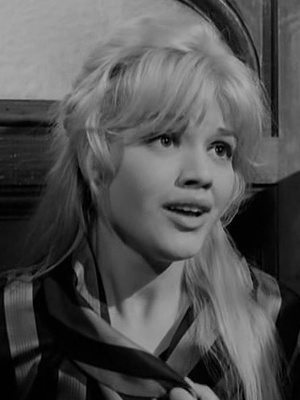
- Gajoni in The Facts of Murder (1959)
- Born: Maria Cristina Gajoni; 4 November 1940 (age 85); Milan, Italy
- Other names: Cristina Gaioni, Cristina Gaioni Visentin
- Occupation: Actress

Maria Cristina Gajoni (born 4 November 1940) is an Italian actress, sometimes credited as Cristina Gaioni and Cristina Gaioni Visentin.

== Life and career ==
Born in Milan, Gajoni studied acting at the drama school of Piccolo Teatro under Giorgio Strehler. She made her film debut in 1958, playing a minor role in Tempest. In 1960, she won a Nastro d'Argento for Best Supporting Actress for her performance in Renato Castellani's ...And the Wild Wild Women. In the following years, she was increasingly cast in minor productions, and disillusioned with her career, she slowed down her acting career to focus on painting.

== Selected filmography ==
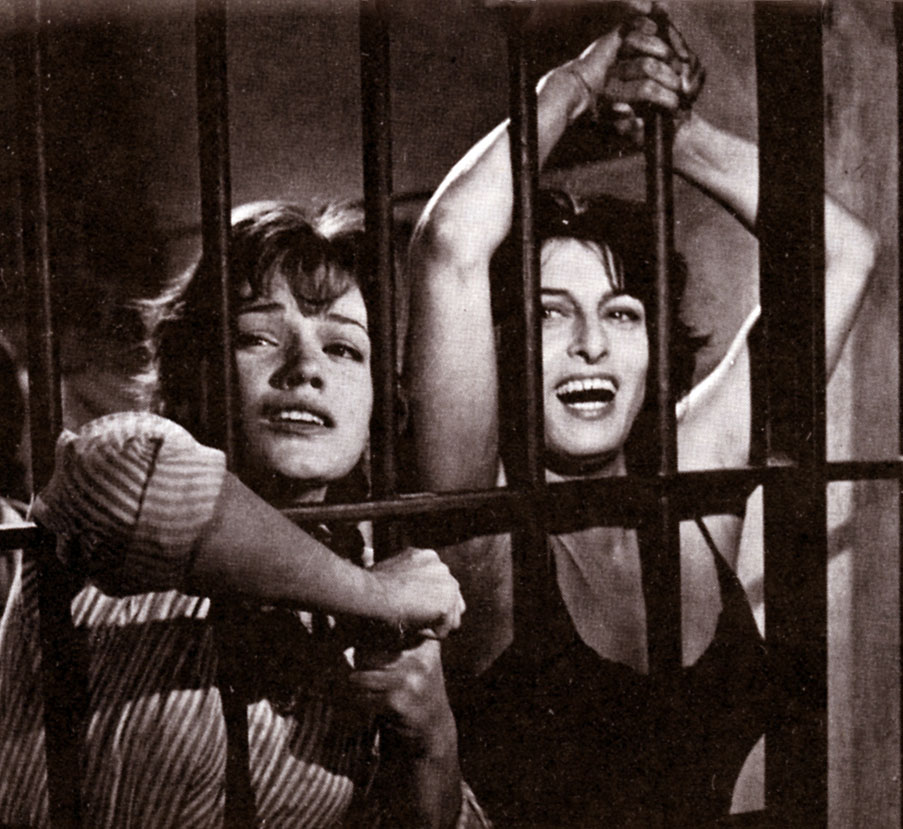
Gajoni (on left) with Anna Magnani in ...And the Wild Wild Women (1959)

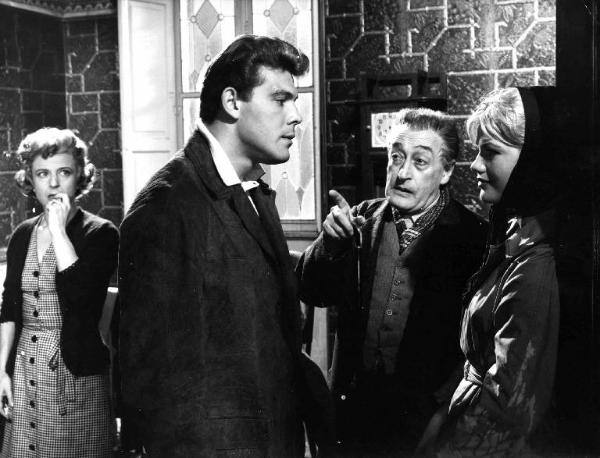
Gajoni (right) with Laura Adani, Angelo Zanolli and Totò in You're on Your Own (1959)

- The Facts of Murder (1959)
- Guinguette (1959)
- You're on Your Own (1959)
- ...And the Wild Wild Women (1959)
- Letto a tre piazze (1960)
- The Assassin (1961)
- Ursus (1961)
- Black City (1961)
- Love at Twenty (1962)
- The Steppe (1962)
- Ten Italians for One German (1962)
- Kerim, Son of the Sheik (1962)
- Le massaggiatrici (1962)
- The Fury of Achilles (1962)
- Slave Girls of Sheba (1963)
- Il Successo (1963)
- Run with the Devil (1963)
- Implacable Three (1963)
- Fire Over Rome (1965)
- Operation Atlantis (1965)
- Night of Violence (1965)
- Pulp (1972)
- Andy Warhol's Frankenstein (1973)
- Women in Cell Block 7 (1973)
- Eye of the Cat (1975)
- Willy Signori e vengo da lontano (1989)
- Camerieri (1995)
