= Suzanne's Career =

1963 film by Éric Rohmer

- DVD cover
- French: La Carrière de Suzanne
- Directed by: Éric Rohmer
- Written by: Éric Rohmer
- Produced by: Barbet Schroeder
- Starring: Catherine Sée; Philippe Beuzen; Christian Charrière; Diane Wilkinson
- Cinematography: Daniel Lacambre
- Edited by: Éric Rohmer (uncredited); Jackie Raynal (uncredited)
- Production company: Les Films du Losange
- Distributed by: Les Films du Losange
- Release date: 27 February 1963 (France)
- Running time: 54 minutes
- Country: France
- Language: French

Suzanne's Career (French: La Carrière de Suzanne) is a 1963 French comedy-drama film written and directed by Éric Rohmer. It is the second installment in Rohmer's Six Moral Tales series. In it, the flirty Guillaume seduces a woman named Suzanne, which becomes problematic for his friendship with the shy Bertrand, especially when Guillaume's and Suzanne's relationship becomes strained.

== Plot ==
Two friends in Paris, the timid pharmacy school student Bertrand and the brash womanizer Guillaume, meet the independent Suzanne, who has a full-time job and studies Italian translation at night, at a café. Guillaume uses his wit and charm to seduce Suzanne, and she quickly succumbs to his coarse advances. He becomes bored after bedding her, but continues to lead her on, despite complaining about her and flirting with other women. Bertrand is ambivalent about Guillaume's treatment of women, but he remains silent and continues to abet Guillaume's antics, believing Suzanne must lack self-respect in order to let herself be treated so poorly.

Perhaps in an effort to regain Guillaume's attention, Suzanne cultivates an interest in Bertrand, spending what little money she has on him. When Guillaume learns this, he gets involved to try to ruin Suzanne financially as a lark, and Bertrand ends up despising Suzanne even more when she lets it happen. Bertrand's crush, the more conventionally pretty Sophie, has become friends with Suzanne, and vigorously defends her from Bertrand's criticism.

After a party, Suzanne has no money to get home, so Bertrand reluctantly agrees to let her sleep in a chair in his room—he has a test in the morning, so he saves the bed for himself. When he returns from his exam, Suzanne is gone, as is some money from his parents that he had stashed away in a book. He searches for Suzanne, and ends up becoming more friendly with Sophie after calling to see if she has Suzanne's address. Sophie thinks it more likely that Guillaume stole the money than that Suzanne did, and eventually relates that Suzanne has become engaged to be married.

Bertrand and Sophie spend an afternoon at a pool with Suzanne and her new fiancé, Frank, who is handsome, well-off, and charming. Whereas Bertrand is doing poorly at school and feels he is losing Sophie, Suzanne seems happy, and he reflects that, without meaning to, Suzanne is getting her revenge by depriving him of the right to view her as a victim or pity her any longer.

== Cast ==
- Catherine Sée as Suzanne Hocquetot
- Philippe Beuzen as Bertrand, the narrator
- Christian Charrière as Guillaume Peuch-Drumond
- Diane Wilkinson as Sophie
- Patrick Bauchau as Frank Schaller (uncredited)
- Jean-Claude Biette as Jean-Louis (uncredited)
- Jean-Louis Comolli as a party guest (uncredited)
- Pierre Cottrell as the art lover party guest (uncredited)
