= The Innocents (1963 film) =

1963 film

- Directed by: Juan Antonio Bardem
- Written by: Juan Antonio Bardem; Eduardo Borrás; Antonio Eceiza; Elías Querejeta
- Produced by: Marciano De La Fuente
- Starring: Alfredo Alcón
- Cinematography: Alberto Etchebehere
- Edited by: Jorge Gárate
- Release date: June 1963
- Running time: 105 minutes
- Countries: Argentina; Spain
- Language: Spanish

The Innocents (Spanish: Los inocentes) is a 1963 Argentine-Spanish drama film written and directed by Juan Antonio Bardem, starring Alfredo Alcón and Paloma Valdés. It was entered into the 13th Berlin International Film Festival. Set mostly in the Argentine city of Mar del Plata, it tells the story of an innocent and sincere young woman from a rich background falling in love with an older bereaved man who her family will never accept.

== Plot ==
The life of Bruno, a bank employee aged 29, is overturned when his wife is found dead alongside the driver of a wrecked car, one of the Ezzquellia brothers who are major industrialists. Having no idea she was unfaithful, Bruno is further upset when a large cheque arrives from the surviving brothers. Refusing to accept it and keep silent, he walks to the Errezquin mansion but the only person who will see him is the dead man's daughter. This is Elena, aged 17, who shares his disgust at her father's behaviour and feels for his loss.

She meets him often to talk about his dead wife and shows her affection for him. Though they become secret lovers, he does not believe the relationship can last and takes a job in another city, where she tracks him down and persuades him to promise marriage. This mobilises the Errezquin, who warn Bruno that they will never consent and they get his job moved to a faraway city. When Elena tracks him down at the railway station where his train is waiting, he rings the Errezquin, who get the police to arrest her as a runaway minor in moral danger.

== Cast ==
- Alfredo Alcón as Bruno Santrori
- Paloma Valdés as Elena Errazquin
- Enrique Fava as Ignazio Fuentes
- Zelmar Gueñol as Leiva Fuentes
- Lía Casanova as Natalia Errazquin
- Eduardo Muñoz as Dionisio Errazquin
