= Run with the Devil =

- Directed by: Mario Camerini
- Written by: Franco Brusati; Mario Camerini; Ennio De Concini; Ugo Guerra
- Cinematography: Leonida Barboni
- Music by: Piero Piccioni
- Release date: 1960
- Language: Italian

Run with the Devil (Italian: Via Margutta) is a 1960 Italian comedy-drama film directed by Mario Camerini.

== Cast ==
- Antonella Lualdi as Donata
- Gérard Blain as Stefano
- Franco Fabrizi as Giosuè
- Cristina Gajoni as Marisa
- Yvonne Furneaux as Marta
- Claudio Gora as Pippo Cantigliani
- Corrado Pani as Youth
- Spiros Focás as Marco Belli
- Alex Nicol as Bill Rogers
- Marion Marshall as Grace
- Franco Giacobini
- Gabriella Giorgelli
