= The Whip and the Body =

1963 Italian gothic horror film

- Italian film poster for The Whip and the Body
- Directed by: Mario Bava
- Starring: Daliah Lavi; Christopher Lee; Tony Kendall; Ida Galli
- Cinematography: Ubaldo Terzano; Mario Bava
- Edited by: Renato Cinquini
- Music by: Carlo Rustichelli
- Color process: Technicolor
- Production companies: Vox Film; Leone Film; Francinor; P.I.P.
- Distributed by: Titanus (Italy)
- Release dates: 29 August 1963 (Italy); 26 January 1966 (France)
- Running time: 91 minutes
- Countries: Italy; France
- Box office: ₤72 million

The Whip and the Body (Italian: La frusta e il corpo) is a 1963 gothic horror film directed by Mario Bava under the alias "John M. Old". The film is about Kurt Menliff (Christopher Lee) who is ostracized by his father for his relationship with a servant girl and her eventual suicide. He later returns to reclaim his title and his former fiancée Nevenka (Daliah Lavi) who is now his brother's wife. Menliff is later found murdered, but the locals believe his ghost has returned to haunt the castle for revenge.

Italian censors removed the film from cinemas due to its sadomasochistic themes. The international cut features some significant changes, and runs for 77 minutes. It was released theatrically as What! and Night Is the Phantom in the United States and United Kingdom, respectively.

== Plot ==
In 19th century Europe, nobleman Kurt Menliff returns to his family's seaside castle after many years of absence in order to supposedly congratulate his younger brother Christian for marrying his former lover Nevenka. However, those at the castle know that Kurt is a sadist and are unhappy with his presence, especially his father Count Menliff and housemaid Giorgia, the latter of whom blames Kurt for the suicide of her daughter Tania, with whom Kurt had an affair before abruptly abandoning her. Nevertheless, they decide to let Kurt stay at the castle overnight.

The next day, Kurt finds Nevenka sitting by herself on the beach. After seducing her, they kiss, but Nevenka suddenly backs away in a panic and strikes Kurt with a riding crop. In response, Kurt takes the crop and whips her on the back several times, to which Nevenka apparently reacts with sexual excitement as she and Kurt make love immediately afterwards. In the evening, after Nevenka fails to return to the castle, Christian sets out to look for her alongside butler Losat and Kurt's cousin Katia, who is secretly in love with Christian. Meanwhile, an unseen figure stabs Kurt in the throat with the dagger that Tania used to kill herself. Losat finds Nevenka lying unconscious on the beach, and he and the others take her back to the castle and put her to bed before discovering Kurt's body.

After Kurt's funeral, the relationships between Nevenka, Christian and Count Meniff begin to fall apart, as Christian suspects his father of having killed Kurt, and Nevenka overhears Christian declaring his love for Katia. Nevenka also begins seeing Kurt in numerous ghostly visions, including one in which he whips her several times in her bedroom, leaving welts all over her body. Eventually, Count Menliff is found dead in his bedroom, having been killed in the exact same way as Kurt. As the castle occupants start to suspect each other of killing the Count, Nevenka suddenly disappears from the castle and is found in the family crypt in an apparent state of ecstasy, claiming that Kurt carried her to the crypt and whipped her. As Christian, Katia and Losat also start having supposed visions of Kurt, Christian comes to believe Nevenka's claims that Kurt's ghost is the one behind the Count's murder, so he and Losat decide to unearth and cremate Kurt's body in an effort to bring an end to the hauntings.

While burning the body, Christian and Losat hear a sinister laugh and spot a figure in a cloak spying on them. Christian chases after the figure, who is revealed to be a crazed Nevenka, who attempts to stab Christian with the dagger before fleeing back into the crypt. There, she has another vision of Kurt, and attempts to stab him, but inadvertedly stabs herself, much to Christian's dismay. Before dying, she reveals to Christian that she has "killed [Kurt] again, this time for good." Losat and Christian determine that Nevenka had gone insane or was perhaps possessed after murdering Kurt, leading her to kill the Count and stage the various "hauntings". Meanwhile, as Kurt's body continues to burn, a riding crop placed in his coffin appears to move by itself.

== Cast ==
- Daliah Lavi as Nevenka
- Christopher Lee as Kurt Menliff
- Tony Kendall as Christian Menliff
- Ida Galli (as Isil Oberon) as Katia
- Harriet Medin (as Harriet White) as Giorgia
- Gustavo De Nardo (as Dean Ardow) as Count Menliff
- Luciano Pigozzi (as Alan Collins) as Losat
- Jacques Herlin as the Priest

== Production ==
The credited screenwriters are Ernesto Gastaldi (as Julian Berry), Ugo Guerra (as Robert Hugo), and Luciano Martino (as Martin Hardy). Gastaldi has stated that he had written the script himself with Guerra possibly contributing to some of the story early on, whilst Martino made no contribution to the script. Gastaldi was shown an Italian print of The Pit and the Pendulum (1961) by the producers who requested a similar film to be made. Gastaldi is credited as an assistant director in the film's credits, but has stated he was never even on the set of the film. Mario Bava was brought in to direct the film through Ugo Guerra's suggestion as he could both direct the film and photograph the film. Bava took care of the cinematography for the film while his regular camera man Ubaldo Terzano is credited as the cinematographer.

The film was shot for under ₤159 million on a six-week shooting schedule with one more week for special effects. The film was shot in both Anzio and Castel Sant'Angelo in Rome.

== Release ==
The film's sadomasochistic theme caused trouble with censors in Italy. The board of censors demanded no cuts to the film, but gave it a V.M. 18 rating meaning that it was forbidden to minors. This was appealed by the production companies for the film who cut parts of the film on their own and later earned a V.M. 14 rating. The Whip and the Body was released in Italy on 29 August 1963 through Titanus. The film was seized on 12 October 1963, with charges of obscenity. The film was declared that it contained "several sequences that refer to degenerations and anomalies of sexual life." The film was then later re-released in January 1964. The law court of Rome ordered the confiscation of several scenes that were described as "contrary to morality". The film poster was to be destroyed and condemned the chief press officer at Titanus to three months on probation. The film grossed a total of 72 million Italian lire.

The Whip and the Body received a release in France under the title Le Corps et le fouet on 26 January 1966. A 77-minute version titled What! was released in the United States in 1965. This version was dubbed in English with none of the actors dubbing their own voices. The 77 minute version was nearly identical to the British edit of the film released under the title Night is the Phantom. Both the American and English versions of the films were heavily edited, in particular having all the whipping scenes removed, causing the film to be incomprehensible.

=== Home video ===
A Region 1 DVD of The Whip and the Body was released by VCI on 31 October 2000 with an 88-minute running time. The DVD was sourced from a 35mm print of the film. The disc included an audio commentary with Tim Lucas, isolated soundtrack, photo gallery, cast and crew biographies and filmographies. A Blu-ray of the film was released by Kino on December 17, 2013. The blu-ray contained a Tim Lucas audio commentary and theatrical trailers. In 2014, the UK Odeon Entertainment blu-ray release included a Tim Lucas commentary that he described on his web site as a "new, revised recording."

== Reception ==
In contemporary reviews, The Monthly Film Bulletin reviewed the 77-minutes English-dubbed version titled Night is the Phantom in 1965. The review referred to the film as "slow, repetitive, verging on parody" and that either "censor or distributor cuts have rendered much of the plot incomprehensible, thought one doubts if it ever made sense entirely." The review compared the film to other genre films of the era, calling it "another of Italy's prankish simulations of British horror movie" as well as stating that "Mario Bava copies [Riccardo] Freda almost slavishly" but "still pulls off some arresting pictorial compositions". "Hogg." of Variety noted that "for sophisitcated audiences, the gothic-novel atmosphere and trappings of secret passages, muddy footprints from the crypt and ghost lover, probably will draw more laughs than gasps. But genuine suspense is maintained throughout." The review commented on the technical elements of the film, stating "superb" cinematography but that the script had "many preposterous lines, and is far too cluttered with cliches such as screams in the night, hurried chases and mystery lights in the crypt."

In 1970, screenwriter Ernesto Gastaldi stated that the film disappointed him. Gastaldi described that he felt about the story “in terms of a psychological nightmare, in the style of Clouzot's films, but Bava saw in it a baroque and decadent drama, and emphasized such tones beyond belief.”

From retrospective reviews, Slant Magazine gave the film four and a half stars out of five, stating that the film found "Bava at the peak of his visual prowess" Online film database AllMovie found that Bava's "exceptional visual style helps to lift an otherwise gloomy picture". The review noted that the film contained a "strong, witty script and one of the finest casts the Italian director ever worked with" resulting in "a solid horror film that works on multiple levels."

== See also ==
- Christopher Lee filmography
- List of French films of 1963
- List of horror films of 1963
- List of Italian films of 1963
