= Paloma Valdés =

Spanish actress

- Born: María Josefa Paloma Filgueira y Rubio; October 23, 1943 (age 82); Valladolid, Spain
- Occupation: Actress
- Years active: 1959-1972 (film & TV)

María Josefa Paloma Filgueira y Rubio (born 1943), better known as Paloma Valdés, is a retired Spanish film and television actress.

== Selected filmography ==
- The Balcony of the Moon (1962)
- The Innocents (1963)
- Camerino Without a Folding Screen (1967)

== Bibliography ==
- Peter Cowie & Derek Elley. World Filmography: 1967. Fairleigh Dickinson University Press, 1977.
