= List of Soviet films of the 1960s =

A list of films produced in the Soviet Union between 1960 and 1969:

== 1960s ==
- Soviet films of 1960
- Soviet films of 1961
- Soviet films of 1962
- Soviet films of 1963
- Soviet films of 1964
- Soviet films of 1965
- Soviet films of 1966
- Soviet films of 1967
- Soviet films of 1968
- Soviet films of 1969
