= Il Successo =

- Directed by: Mauro Morassi; Dino Risi (uncredited)
- Written by: Ettore Scola; Ruggero Maccari
- Produced by: Mario Cecchi Gori
- Cinematography: Alessandro D'Eva
- Edited by: Maurizio Lucidi
- Music by: Ennio Morricone
- Release date: 1963
- Language: Italian

Il Successo (also known as The Success) is a 1963 Italian comedy film directed by Mauro Morassi. It is considered an unofficial sequel of Dino Risi's Il Sorpasso, with Vittorio Gassman and Jean-Louis Trintignant reprising their roles with slight changes. The same Risi directed part of the film.

== Cast ==
- Vittorio Gassman: Giulio Cerioni
- Jean-Louis Trintignant: Sergio
- Anouk Aimée: Laura
- Maria Grazia Spina : Diana
- Cristina Gajoni: Maria
- Filippo Scelzo: Francesco Cerioni
- Gastone Moschin: Romeo
- Leopoldo Trieste: Grassi
- Riccardo Garrone: Giancarlo
- Mino Doro: Cesaretto
- Daniele Vargas: Consouler
- Annie Gorassini: Marisa
- Umberto D'Orsi: Lallo
- Franca Polesello: Carla
- Carlo Bagno: Varelli
