= Marino Masè =

Italian actor (1939–2022)

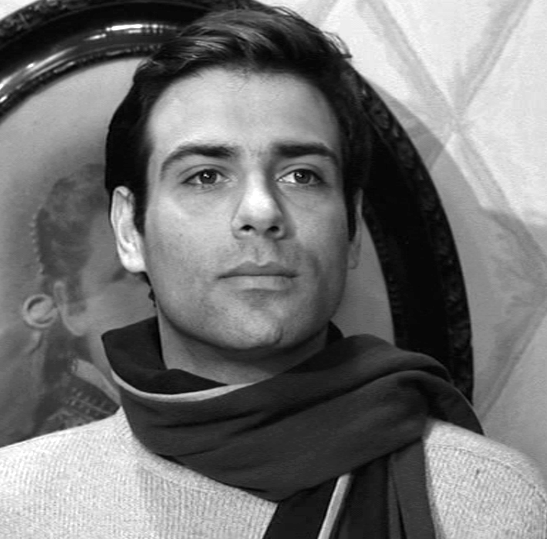
- Masè in Fists in the Pocket (1965)
- Born: 21 March 1939; Trieste, Italy
- Died: 28 May 2022 (aged 83); Rome, Italy
- Occupation: Actor
- Years active: 1961–2022

Marino Masè (21 March 1939 – 28 May 2022) was an Italian actor who appeared in more than 70 films.

== Life ==
Masè was born in Trieste on 21 March 1939. While still a teenager, he joined the laboratory for young actors of the production company Vides by Franco Cristaldi and studied acting under Alessandro Fersen. He made his stage debut in 1960 in L'arialda, directed by Luchino Visconti, and his film debut in the 1961 adventure Romulus and the Sabines by Richard Pottier. He had several leading roles in the first half of the 1960s, including Marco Bellocchio's Fists in the Pocket and Jean-Luc Godard's Les Carabiniers, then he was mainly cast in supporting roles. Masè was also active in the adaptation of the dialogues for dubbing.

Masè died in Rome on 28 May 2022, at the age of 83.

== Selected filmography ==
- Romulus and the Sabines (1961) as Leno
- The Leopard (1963) as Tutor
- The Carabineers (1963) as Ulysses
- A Sentimental Attempt (1963) as Piero, Dino's Brother-in-law
- I mostri (1963) as The Lover (segment "L'Oppio dei Popoli")
- Love and Marriage (1964) (segment "Basta un attimo")
- Hard Time for Princes (1965) as Angelo
- Goliath at the Conquest of Damascus (1965) as Phir
- Fists in the Pocket (1965) as Augusto
- Nightmare Castle (1965) as Dr. Derek Joyce
- Gendarme in New York (1965) as Aldo
- The Spy Who Loved Flowers (1966) as Dick
- Jericho (1966) as Jean-Gaston Andre
- The Vatican Affair (1968) as Richard
- Commandos (1968) as Italian Lt. Tomassini
- Detective Belli (1969) as Romanis (uncredited)
- The Five Man Army (1969) as Railroad Man
- The Year of the Cannibals (1969) as Ismene's Fiancé
- Pussycat, Pussycat, I Love You (1970) as Franco
- N.P. - Il segreto (1970)
- Lady Frankenstein (1971) as Thomas Stack, the mildly retarded servant of Baron Frankenstein
- The Policeman (1971)
- The Red Queen Kills Seven Times (1972) as Police Inspector
- Il Boss (1973) as Pignataro
- I Kiss the Hand (1973) as Luciano Ferrante
- Massacre in Rome (1973) as Third partisan in Via rasella's window
- The Bloody Hands of the Law (1973) as Giuseppe di Leo
- The Night Porter (1974) as Atherton
- The Driver's Seat (1974) as Traffic Policeman
- Donna è bello (1974) as Mario
- Zorro (1975) as Miguel de la Serna
- Kidnap Syndicate (1975) as Pardi
- Calling All Police Cars (1975) as Franz Hekker - Francesco Pagano
- Vergine e di nome Maria (1975)
- Live Like a Cop, Die Like a Man (1976) as Rick
- A Sold Life (1976) as Professor Marcelli
- A Matter of Time (1976) as Hotel Forum Porter
- Emanuelle Around the World (1977) as Cassei
- L'uomo di Corleone (1977)
- Standard (1978)
- Assassinio sul Tevere (1979) as Enzo Nardelli
- Play Motel (1979) as Massimo "Max" Liguori
- Contamination (1980) as NYPD Lt. Tony Aris
- The Salamander (1981) as Captain Rigoli
- Il carabiniere (1981) as Gianni
- Cercasi Gesù (1982)
- The Secret Nights of Lucrezia Borgia (1982) as The Duke
- Tenebrae (1982) as John
- King David (1985) as Agag
- The Repenter (1985)
- Voglia di guardare (1986) as Diego
- The Professor (1986) as Il faccendiere Sapienza
- The Belly of an Architect (1987) as Trettorio
- L'attrazione (1987) as Victor
- Phantom of Death (1988) as Expert on aging
- Provocazione (1988) as Professor
- The Palermo Connection (1990)
- Senza scrupoli 2 (1990) as Maestro
- The Godfather Part III (1990) as Lupo
- The Raffle (1991)
- Venti dal Sud (1993) as Paul Legrand
- Bits and Pieces (1996)
- The Eighteenth Angel (1997) as Local Doctor
- Il decisionista (1997)
- Doublecross on Costa's Island (1997) as Paolo Bigetti
- Autunno (1999) as Matteo's Father
- Ginostra (2002) as Night Watchman
- Nel mio amore (2004) as Prete anziano
- Quale amore (2006) as Bank director
