= The Carabineers =

- Directed by: Jean-Luc Godard
- Written by: Jean-Luc Godard; Jean Gruault; Roberto Rossellini
- Based on: I due carabinieri play by Beniamino Joppolo
- Produced by: Georges de Beauregard; Carlo Ponti
- Starring: Marino Masè
- Cinematography: Raoul Coutard
- Edited by: Agnès Guillemot; Lila Lakshmanan
- Music by: Philippe Arthuys
- Production company: Cocinor
- Distributed by: Cocinor
- Release date: 1963
- Running time: 80 minutes
- Country: France
- Language: French
- Budget: $104,000

The Carabineers (French: Les Carabiniers) is a 1963 French war comedy-drama film by French filmmaker Jean-Luc Godard.

== Plot ==
Les Carabiniers (1963) tells the story of two poor men called to serve in battle, lured by promises of the world's riches. Ulysses (Marino Mase) and Michelangelo (Albert Juross) receive letters from the king of their fictional country that allow them to have complete freedom from consequence while fighting in the war, in return for anything they desire—swimming pools, Maseratis, women—at the enemy's expense.

Their wives, Venus and Cleopatra (Catherine Ribeiro and Genevieve Galea) encourage them to fight when they hear about the riches. The two men leave and cross the battlefields and villages, destroying and pillaging as they wish. The pair's exploits are recounted through postcards sent to their wives, telling tales of the horrors of battle. The previously idealistic idea that the men have of war disintegrates, as they are still poor and now wounded. They return home with a suitcase full of postcards of the splendors of the world that they have fought for, and are told by army officials that they must wait until the war ends to receive their pay.

One day, the sky explodes with sparks, and the couples race into town, believing that the war has ended. Ulysses and Michelangelo are informed by their superiors that their king has lost the war, and that all of the war criminals must be punished. The two men are then shot for their crimes.

== Cast ==
- Marino Masé as Ulysses (as Marino Mase)
- Patrice Moullet as Michel-Ange (as Albert Juross)
- Geneviève Galéa as Venus
- Catherine Ribeiro as Cleopatre
- Barbet Schroeder as Car salesman
- Jean-Louis Comolli as Soldier with fish
- Gérard Poirot as Carabinier #1
- Jean Brassat as Carabinier #2
- Alvaro Gheri as Carabinier #3
- Odile Geoffroy as Young Communist girl
- Jean Gruault as Bebe's father

== Critical responses ==
Writing about the film in Harpers Magazine in 1969, the critic Pauline Kael declared it, "hell to watch for the first hour...exciting to think about after because its one good sequence, the long picture-postcard sequence near the end, is so incredible and so brilliantly prolonged. The picture has been crawling and stumbling along and then it climbs a high wire and walks it and keeps walking it until we're almost dizzy from admiration. The tight rope is rarely stretched so high in movies..."

== In popular culture ==
The author and critic Susan Sontag referenced the film in her 1977 collection of essays On Photography. With respect to the "two sluggish lumpen-peasants" returning home bearing postcards of the treasures of the world instead of tangible treasure, Sontag noted that "Godard's gag vividly parodies the equivocal magic of the photographic image." She goes on to say that there is rarely a movie that audiences go with and that is able to keep their attention.
