= Goliath and the Rebel Slave =

- Directed by: Mario Caiano
- Screenplay by: Gian Paolo Callegari; Albert Valentin
- Produced by: Giorgio Agliani
- Starring: Gordon Scott; Ombretta Colli; Gloria Milland
- Cinematography: Pier Ludovico Pavoni
- Edited by: Nella Nannuzzi
- Music by: Carlo Franci
- Production companies: Compagnia Internazionale Realizzazioni Artistiche Cinematograiche; Films Internazionali Artistici; Les Productiones Georges de Beauregard
- Release date: 5 September 1963 (Italy)
- Running time: 105 minutes
- Countries: Italy; France

Goliath and the Rebel Slave (Italian: Goliath e la schiava ribelle), also known as The Tyrant of Lydia Against the Son of Hercules, is a 1963 Eastmancolor adventure peplum film directed by Mario Caiano.

== Cast ==
- Gordon Scott as Goliath
- Ombretta Colli as Princess Cori
- Massimo Serato as Marcius
- Mimmo Palmara as Artafernes
- Giuseppe Fortis as Barbuk
- Gabriele Antonini as Alexander the Great
- Serge Nubret as Milan
- Gloria Milland as Zoé
- Mirko Ellis

== Release ==
Goliath and the Rebel Slave was released in Italy on September 5, 1963. It was released in the United States in 1964 as The Tyrant of Lydia Against the Son of Hercules.

== Reception ==
A contemporary review in the Monthly Film Bulletin referred to the film as a "sluggish, run-of-the-mill affair which is weighed down by arguments, disputes and torturous double-crossings." The review concluded that "the script is naive, the colour print poor, and the whole thing takes an age to disentangle itself"

== Footnotes ==
=== References ===
- Kinnard, Roy; Crnkovich, Tony (2017). Italian Sword and Sandal Films, 1908-1990. McFarland. ISBN 978-1476662916.
