= Jean-Louis Comolli =

French writer, editor, and film editor (1941–2022)

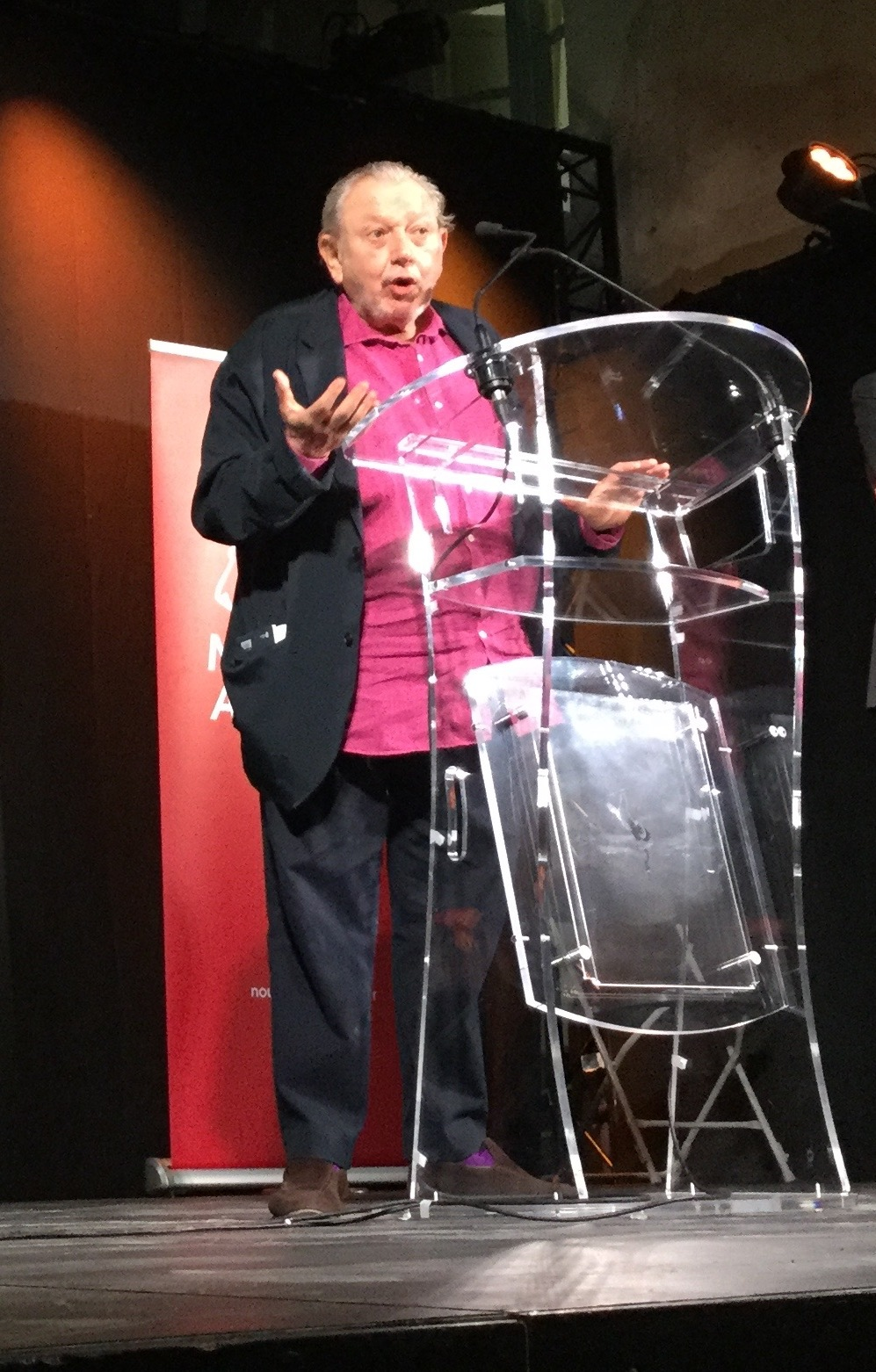
- Jean-Louis Comolli in 2018
- Born: 30 July 1941; Philippeville, French Algeria, France
- Died: 19 May 2022 (aged 80); France
- Occupations: Film critic, director, screenwriter

Jean-Louis Comolli (30 July 1941 – 19 May 2022) was a French writer, editor, and film director.

== Career ==
Comolli was editor in chief of Cahiers du cinéma from 1966 to 1978, having been passed the editorial baton by Jacques Rivette — who always saw his own position on the journal as a transitional one — when Comolli was still in his early twenties. In October 1969, Comolli and co-editor Jean Narboni published the editorial "Cinéma/idéologie/critique" ("Cinema/Ideology/Criticism"), which proclaimed that "all films are political" and announced Cahiers' Marxist turn. The editorial was incendiary enough that the journal's then-owner, media tycoon Daniel Filipacchi, attempted to shut down Cahiers and replace its editorial board; financial assistance from former contributors allowed the journal to be bought out, and after a four-month break it resumed publication in March 1970.

During the same period, Comolli wrote the influential essays "Machines of the Visible" (1971) and "Technique and Ideology: Camera, Perspective, Depth of Field" (1971–72), which appeared in six installments between May 1971 and September 1972. As Fairfax notes, "Technique and Ideology" represents "one of the most rigorous efforts to apply Althusserian Marxist theory to a historical analysis of the development of the cinema," engaging in debates with theoretical trends as diverse as André Bazin's notion of ontological realism, the traditional film historiography of Georges Sadoul and Jean Mitry, the technicist positions of Jean-Patrick Lebel, and the Marxism of Cinéthique. Both essays have been translated in English anthologies of film and media studies, though prior to the Fairfax translation, "Technique and Ideology" had never received an integral English-language publication, having previously circulated only piecemeal across a number of different anthologies. This work was important in the discussion on apparatus theory, an attempt to rethink cinema as a site for the production and maintenance of dominant state ideology in the wake of May 1968.

Comolli and Narboni distanced themselves from the Cahiers editorial board in 1973, with Serge Daney and Serge Toubiana taking over and leading the journal gradually back toward the mainstream. After his tenure at Cahiers, Comolli continued his work as a director. For a time, filmmaking supplanted theorizing about cinema in his practice, but his reticence began to change in the late 1980s, when he was led back to a preoccupation with film theory after a period of writing on jazz — always his second great passion. His subsequent writings on film theory and documentary practice were collected in two major volumes, Voir et pouvoir (2004) and Corps et cadre (2012). He taught film theory at the Universities of Paris VIII, Barcelona, Strasburg and Genève.

In 2009, Comolli returned to his earlier texts, maintaining that the questions addressed in "Technique and Ideology" "are still active today, 37 years later," and producing a theoretical reconsideration of its central arguments in light of the sweeping changes to cinema and the world in the era of neo-liberal capitalism and media globalization. The resulting book, Cinéma, contre spectacle (Éditions Verdier, 2009), was translated into English by Daniel Fairfax as Cinema against Spectacle: Technique and Ideology Revisited (Amsterdam University Press, 2015), which presents, for the first time in English, Comolli's entire six-part essay in a fresh annotated translation, alongside the "Cinema/Ideology/Criticism" editorial (Appendix I) and "Machines of the Visible" (Appendix II).

== Select filmography ==
- 1968: Les deux Marseillaises (co-director: André S. Labarthe)
- 1969: Comme je te veux
- 1975: La Cecilia
- 1981: L'Ombre rouge
- 1983: Balles perdues
- 1986: Le Bal d'Irène (TV)
- 1987: Pétition (TV)
- 1989: Marseille de père en fils - Coup de mistral
- 1989: Marseille de père en fils - Ombres sur la ville
- 1992: La Campagne de Provence
- 1993: Marseille en mars
- 1994: Jeune fille au livre
- 1995: Georges Delerue (TV)
- 1996: Marseille contre Marseille
- 1997: Nos deux Marseillaises
- 1997: La Question des alliances
- 2000: Durruti, portrait d'un anarchiste
- 2003: Rêves de France à Marseille
- 2004: Les Esprits du Koniambo (TV)
- 2005: Le Peintre, le poète et l'historien (TV)
- 2006: La dernière utopie: La télévision selon Rossellini (documentary)
- 2008: Entretiens du Louvre (TV)
- 2009: Face aux fantômes (documentary)
- 2011: À voir absolument: 1963-1973 Dix années aux Cahiers du Cinéma (documentary)
- 2013: A Fellini, romance d'un spectateur amoureux (documentary)
- 2014: Cinéma documentaire, Fragments d'une histoire (documentary)
- 2016: Richard Dindo, Pages Choisies (documentary)
- 2016: Marseille entre deux tours (documentary)
- 2018: Les Fantômes de Mai 68 (documentary)
- 2019: Nicolas Philibert, hasard et nécessité (documentary)

== Select bibliography ==
- Comolli, Jean-Louis, and Jean Narboni. "Cinema/Ideology/Criticism." Screen 12, no. 1 (1971). Reprinted as Appendix I in Cinema against Spectacle, ed. Fairfax (2015).
- Voir et pouvoir: L'innocence perdue: cinéma, télévision, fiction, documentaire. Verdier, 2004.
- Corps et cadre: cinéma, éthique, politique. Verdier, 2012.
- Cinéma, contre spectacle. Éditions Verdier, 2009. Trans. by Daniel Fairfax as Cinema against Spectacle: Technique and Ideology Revisited. Amsterdam University Press, 2015. ISBN 9789089645548.

Media offices
Preceded by Jean Narboni	Editor of Cahiers du cinéma 1966–1971; With: Jean Narboni	Succeeded by Jean Narboni
