= Nutty, Naughty Chateau =

- Directed by: Roger Vadim
- Written by: Françoise Sagan (play); Roger Vadim; Claude Choublier
- Produced by: Robert Dorfmann
- Starring: Monica Vitti
- Cinematography: Armand Thirard
- Music by: Maurice Le Sénéchal
- Release date: 1963
- Language: French
- Box office: 1,047,586 admissions (France)

Nutty, Naughty Chateau (French: Château en Suède, Italian: Il castello in Svezia) is a 1963 French-Italian comedy film directed by Roger Vadim starring Monica Vitti.

The film is the screen debut of Françoise Hardy. It adapts a play by Françoise Sagan.

== Cast ==
- Monica Vitti as Éléonore
- Curd Jürgens as Hugo Falsen
- Jean-Claude Brialy as Sébastien
- Jean-Louis Trintignant as Éric
- Daniel Emilfork as Gunther
- Suzanne Flon as Agathe
- Françoise Hardy as Ophélie
- Michel Le Royer as Gosta
- Sylvie as the Grandmother
- Henri Attal as Policeman #1
- Dominique Zardi as Policeman#2

== Production ==
The film was shot in Stockholm.

== Reception ==
The film was reviewed in les Cahiers du Cinéma. In 1978 Le Nouvel Observateur found it adapted the play faithfully. A retrospective reviewer wrote: "This film, like most of the director's films, has aged seriously."
