= Highway Pickup =

Chair de poule
- French theatrical release poster
- Directed by: Julien Duvivier
- Screenplay by: Julien Duvivier; René Barjavel
- Based on: the novel Come Easy, Go Easy by James Hadley Chase
- Produced by: Raymond Hakim; Robert Hakim
- Starring: Robert Hossein; Catherine Rouvel; Jean Sorel; Georges Wilson
- Cinematography: Léonce-Henri Burel
- Edited by: Suzanne de Troeye
- Music by: Georges Delerue
- Distributed by: Pathé
- Release date: 13 November 1963; (France)
- Running time: 107 minutes
- Country: France
- Language: French

Chair de poule (French for "goosebumps") is a 1963 French crime film directed by Julien Duvivier and starring Robert Hossein, Catherine Rouvel, Jean Sorel and Georges Wilson. The screenplay is based on the 1960 novel Come Easy, Go Easy by James Hadley Chase, which took several plot elements from the 1934 novel The Postman Always Rings Twice by James M Cain. The film was released in the United States as Highway Pickup.

== Plot ==
In Paris, Daniel and Paul work installing safes by day and robbing them by night. When a raid goes wrong and a man is killed, Daniel is shot down by the police and jailed. He escapes and, heading south, is given a job and a room by Thomas, who runs an isolated café and garage with his much younger wife Maria. She scorns the drifter her husband has hired until, by chance, she sees an old newspaper that reports his escape. She tells Daniel she will turn him in unless he opens the safe where Thomas keeps his cash.

When Thomas is out one night, Daniel starts work; but Thomas returns early and after an argument Maria shoots him dead. Once Daniel has buried the body, the two try to run the place as before, except that they now share a bed. After Daniel rings Paris to tell Paul where he is, Paul joins them and Maria switches her attentions to him, thinking he will be easier to deal with if he opens the safe that Daniel refuses to touch again. Intruders then wound Daniel so that he is immobilised and, while Maria is out, Paul opens the safe. But she returns early and after an argument he shoots her dead. Leaving Daniel to his fate, he is making off with the money when he is caught at a police roadblock and shot dead.

== Cast ==
- Robert Hossein as Daniel Boisset
- Catherine Rouvel as Maria
- Jean Sorel as Paul Genest
- Georges Wilson as Thomas
- Lucien Raimbourg as Roux
- Nicole Berger as Simone
- Jacques Bertrand as Marc
- Jean-Jacques Delbo as Joubert
- Sophie Grimaldi as Starlet
- Armand Mestral as Corenne
- Jean Lefebvre as Priest
- Robert Dalban as Brigadier
