= Ombretta Colli =

Italian singer, actress and politician

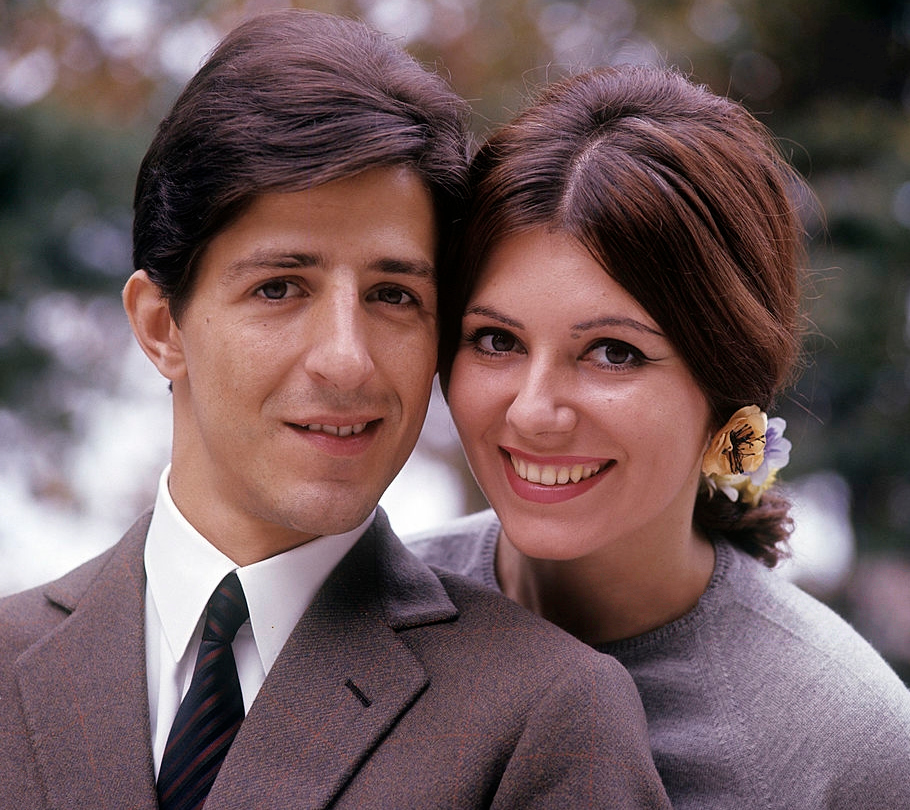
- Ombretta Colli with Giorgio Gaber in 1964
- Born: Ombretta Comelli; 21 September 1943 (age 82); Genoa, Italy
- Education: University of Milan
- Occupations: Singer; actress; politician
- Years active: 1961–1989
- Spouse: Giorgio Gaber (m. 1965; died 2003)
- Children: 1

Ombretta Colli (born Ombretta Comelli on 21 September 1943) is an Italian singer, actress and politician. She was president of the Province of Milan from June 1999 to June 2004.

== Biography ==
Colli's father was a singer, drummer and bassist from Milan. Because of his work he traveled with family around Italy and abroad. Thus Colli was born in Genoa, finished her sixth grade in Turin, seventh grade in Venice, and then lived in Switzerland, Austria and Germany. After she turned 17 her family resettled in Milan.

In 1961–1962 Colli debuted as a film and stage actress, and was later featured as a model on the cover of a disk recorded by Giorgio Gaber, an Italian singer, composer, actor and playwright; they married on 12 April 1965. At the time Colli was studying Chinese and Russian languages at the University of Milan, and was active as a film actress, appearing in at least 10 movies in 1961–1967, including several peplum films. In 1966 she gave birth to daughter Dalia. Colli had a hiatus as an actress between 1967 and late 1970s, and focused on her singing career. She returned to film acting in 1979–1989, and after that turned to television and politics. In 1994 she became Member of the European Parliament, where she worked at the office of social affairs. From 1997 to 1999 Colli was councilor for social services in Milan, and in June 1999 was elected as president of the Province of Milan. Gaber, who did not vote since 1976, came to vote for her in 1999. She lost re-elections in 2004, and moved to other posts in the city of Milan.

== Selected filmography ==
- Colpo gobbo all'italiana (1962) as Silvana
- The Slave (1962)
- Gladiator of Rome (1962)
- Goliath and the Rebel Slave (1963)
- The Blancheville Monster (1963) (as Joan Hills)
- The Mighty Khan (1964)
- Samson vs. the Giant King (1964)
- Crimine a due (1964)
- War Between the Planets (1966) (as Amber Collins)
- Snow Devils (1967) (as Amber Collins)
- Profumo di classe (1979)
- Good News (1979)
- La terrazza (1980)
- Arrivano i bersaglieri (1980)
