= Vice and Virtue =

1963 film by Roger Vadim

- Theatrical release poster
- French: Le Vice et la Vertu
- Directed by: Roger Vadim
- Screenplay by: Roger Vailland; Roger Vadim
- Starring: Annie Girardot; Robert Hossein; Catherine Deneuve; O.E. Hasse; Valeria Ciangottini; Philippe Lemaire; Luciana Paluzzi
- Cinematography: Marcel Grignon
- Edited by: Victoria Mercanton
- Music by: Michel Magne
- Production companies: S.N.E. Gaumont; Trainon Films; Ultra Film; Sicilia Cinematografica
- Distributed by: Gaumont
- Release dates: 1 March 1963 (France); 26 March 1963 (Italy)
- Running time: 106 minutes
- Countries: France; Italy
- Language: French
- Box office: $9.3 million

Vice and Virtue (French: Le Vice et la Vertu) is a 1963 war drama film directed by Roger Vadim and inspired by some of Marquis de Sade's characters. It stars Annie Girardot as Juliette (Vice), Robert Hossein as the sadistic German officer and Catherine Deneuve, in her first notable film role, as Justine (Virtue).

== Plot ==
A war film where Catherine Deneuve holds her first notable role in the cinema (Justine, virtue). Annie Girardot plays Juliette (vice) and Robert Hossein plays the sadistic German officer.

== Cast ==
- Annie Girardot as Juliette Morand
- Robert Hossein as SS Colonel Schörndorf
- Catherine Deneuve as Justine Morand
- O.E. Hasse as General von Bamberg
- Philippe Lemaire as Hans Streicher
- Luciana Paluzzi as Helena
- Valeria Ciangottini as Manuela
- Astrid Heeren as Danielle
- Serge Marquand as Ivan
- Georges Poujouly as Lieutenant Hoech
- Monique Messine as Anne
- Jean-Daniel Simon as Ludwig

== Production ==
Filming partially took place in the Lot department, including at the Château de la Treyne in Lacave.

== Reception ==
The film recorded admissions of 1,556,664 in France.
