= List of neo-noir films =

The following is a list of films belonging to the neo-noir genre. Following a common convention of associating the 1940s and 1950s with film noir, the list takes 1960 to date the beginning of the genre.

== List of films: 1960–1969 ==
Film	Director	Year	Country	Ref(s).
13 West Street	Philip Leacock	1962	United States	
The 3rd Voice	Hubert Cornfield	1960	United States	
Afraid to Die	Yasuzo Masumura	1960	Japan	
All Night Long	Basil Dearden	1962	United Kingdom	
Alphaville	Jean-Luc Godard	1965	France	
Any Number Can Win	Henri Verneuil	1963	France	
Army of Shadows	Jean-Pierre Melville	1969	France	
The Assassin	Elio Petri	1961	Italy	
Assignment K	Val Guest	1968	United Kingdom	
L'avventura	Michelangelo Antonioni	1960	Italy	
The Bad Sleep Well	Akira Kurosawa	1960	Japan	
Bande à part	Jean-Luc Godard	1964	France	
Bandits in Milan	Carlo Lizzani	1968	Italy	
Beat Girl	Edmond T. Gréville	1960	United Kingdom	
The Birthday Party	William Friedkin	1968	United Kingdom	
Blast of Silence	Allen Baron	1961	United States	
Blood and Black Lace	Mario Bava	1964	Italy	
Blowup	Michelangelo Antonioni	1966	United Kingdom, Italy, United States	
Bonnie and Clyde	Arthur Penn	1967	United States	
Brainstorm	William Conrad	1965	United States	
Branded to Kill	Seijun Suzuki	1967	Japan	
Breathless	Jean-Luc Godard	1960	France	
The Bride Wore Black	François Truffaut	1968	France	
Bullitt	Peter Yates	1968	United States	
Bunny Lake Is Missing	Otto Preminger	1965	United Kingdom, United States	
Cape Fear	J. Lee Thompson	1962	United States	
Carnival of Souls	Herk Harvey	1962	United States	
Cash on Demand	Quentin Lawrence	1961	United Kingdom	
Castle of Blood	Antonio Margheriti and Sergio Corbucci	1964	Italy	
Le cave se rebiffe	Gilles Grangier	1961	France	
La caza	Carlos Saura	1966	Spain	
The Ceremony	Laurence Harvey	1963	United States	
The Challenge	John Gilling	1960	United Kingdom	
The Champagne Murders	Claude Chabrol	1967	France	
The Chase	Arthur Penn	1966	United States	
Le clan des siciliens	Henri Verneuil	1969	France	
Le Combat dans l'île	Alain Cavalier	1962	France	
Classe Tous Risques	Claude Sautet	1960	France	
A Colt Is My Passport	Takashi Nomura	1967	Japan	
La commare secca	Bernardo Bertolucci	1962	Italy	
The Criminal	Joseph Losey	1960	United Kingdom	
Crossplot	Alvin Rakoff	1969	United Kingdom	
Cruel Gun Story	Takumi Furukawa	1964	Japan	
Cul-de-sac	Roman Polanski	1966	United Kingdom	
Dahlia	Susana C. De Guzman	1960	Philippines	
The Damned	Joseph Losey	1963	United Kingdom	
A Dandy in Aspic	Anthony Mann	1968	United Kingdom	
The Day of the Owl	Damiano Damiani	1968	Italy	
Deadfall	Bryan Forbes	1968	United Kingdom	
The Deadly Affair	Sidney Lumet	1967	United Kingdom	
The Delinquents	Carlos Saura	1960	Spain	
The Detective	Gordon Douglas	1968	United States	
Le deuxième souffle	Jean-Pierre Melville	1966	France	
Diabolically Yours	Julien Duvivier	1967	France, Italy, Germany	
Do You Know This Voice?	Dan Duryea and Isa Miranda	1964	United Kingdom	
Le Doulos	Jean-Pierre Melville	1962	France	
Eva	Joseph Losey	1962	France	
Experiment in Terror	Blake Edwards	1962	United States	
Eyes Without a Face	Georges Franju	1960	France	
Fantômas	André Hunebelle	1964	France	
The File of the Golden Goose	Sam Wanamaker	1969	United Kingdom	
Five Minutes to Live	Bill Karn	1961	United States	
The Frightened City	John Lemont	1961	United Kingdom	
A Fugitive from the Past	Tomu Uchida	1965	Japan	
A Game without Rules	Jindřich Polák	1967	Czechoslovakia	
The Girl Hunters	Roy Rowland	1963	United Kingdom	
The Great Spy Chase	Georges Lautner	1964	France	
Gunn	Blake Edwards	1967	United States	
Hammerhead	David Miller	1968	United Kingdom	
Hands over the City	Francesco Rosi	1963	Italy	
Hard Contract	S. Lee Pogostin	1969	United States	
Harper	Jack Smight	1966	United States	
The Haunting	Robert Wise	1963	United Kingdom	
Hell Is a City	Val Guest	1960	United Kingdom	
High and Low	Akira Kurosawa	1963	Japan	
The High Commissioner	Ralph Thomas	1968	United Kingdom, United States	
The Hole	Jacques Becker	1960	France	
Hoodlum Priest	Irvin Kershner	1961	United States	
The Hostage	Russell Doughten	1967	United States	
The Housemaid	Kim Ki-young	1960	South Korea	
The Hustler	Robert Rossen	1961	United States	
In Cold Blood	Richard Brooks	1967	United States	
In the Heat of the Night	Norman Jewison	1967	United States	
The Incident	Larry Peerce	1967	United States	
Intimidation	Koreyoshi Kurahara	1960	Japan	
The Ipcress File	Sidney J. Furie	1965	United Kingdom	
Johnny Cool	William Asher	1963	United States	
Joy House	René Clément	1964	France	
Judex	Georges Franju	1963	France	
Key Witness	Phil Karlson	1960	United States	
The Killers	Don Siegel	1964	United States	
The Killing Game	Alain Jessua	1967	France	
Kitten with a Whip	Douglas Heyes	1964	United States	
Kung Ako'y Mahal Mo	Gregorio Fernandez	1960	Philippines	
Lady in Cement	Gordon Douglas	1968	United States	
Landru	Claude Chabrol	1963	France	
The Lawbreakers	Joseph M. Newman	1961	United States	
Life Love Death	Claude Lelouch	1968	France	
Lilith	Robert Rossen	1964	United States	
Love Is Colder Than Death	Rainer Werner Fassbinder	1969	West Germany	
A Lovely Way to Die	David Lowell Rich	1968	United States	
Made in U.S.A.	Jean-Luc Godard	1966	France	
Mademoiselle	Tony Richardson	1966	United Kingdom, France	
Madigan	Don Siegel	1968	United States	
Magnet of Doom	Jean-Pierre Melville	1963	France	
The Man Without a Map	Hiroshi Teshigahara	1968	Japan	
Man-Trap	Edmond O'Brien	1961	United States	
The Manchurian Candidate	John Frankenheimer	1962	United States	
Marlowe	Paul Bogart	1969	United States	
Marnie	Alfred Hitchcock	1964	United States	
Medium Cool	Haskell Wexler	1969	United States	
La Métamorphose des cloportes	Pierre Granier-Deferre	1965	France	
Mickey One	Arthur Penn	1965	United States	
Midnight Lace	David Miller	1960	United States	
Mirage	Edward Dmytryk	1965	United States	
Mississippi Mermaid	François Truffaut	1969	France	
The Money Trap	Burt Kennedy	1966	United States	
Murder, Inc.	Burt Balaban and Stuart Rosenberg	1960	United States	
My Blood Runs Cold	William Conrad	1965	United States	
The Naked Kiss	Samuel Fuller	1964	United States	
Never Let Go	John Guillermin	1960	United Kingdom	
Night Train to Mundo Fine	Coleman Francis	1966	United States	
The Night of the Generals	Anatole Litvak	1967	United Kingdom, France, United States	
Nightmare	Freddie Francis	1964	United Kingdom	
Ocean's 11	Lewis Milestone	1960	United States	
Once a Thief	Ralph Nelson	1965	United States	
P.J.	John Guillermin	1968	United States	
Pale Flower	Masahiro Shinoda	1964	Japan	
Panic in the City	Eddie Davis	1968	United States	
Paranoiac	Freddie Francis	1963	United Kingdom	
Pay or Die	Richard Wilson	1960	United States	
Peau d'espion	Édouard Molinaro	1967	France	
Peeping Tom	Michael Powell	1960	United Kingdom	
Pendulum	George Schaefer	1969	United States	
Pierrot le Fou	Jean-Luc Godard	1965	France	
Pigs and Battleships	Shōhei Imamura	1961	Japan	
La Piscine	Jacques Deray	1969	France	
Point Blank	John Boorman	1967	United States	
Portrait in Black	Michael Gordon	1960	United States	
Pretty Poison	Noel Black	1968	United States	
Psycho	Alfred Hitchcock	1960	United States	
Purple Noon	René Clément	1960	France	
The Pusher	Gene Milford	1960	United States	
The Quiller Memorandum	Michael Anderson	1966	United Kingdom	
Rage	Gilberto Gazcón	1966	Mexico, United States	
Repulsion	Roman Polanski	1965	United Kingdom	
Requiem for a Heavyweight	Ralph Nelson	1962	United States	
Robbery	Peter Yates	1967	United Kingdom	
The Running Man	Carol Reed	1963	United Kingdom	
Salvatore Giuliano	Francesco Rosi	1962	Italy	
Le Samouraï	Jean-Pierre Melville	1967	France	
Sandra	Luchino Visconti	1965	Italy	
Seance on a Wet Afternoon	Bryan Forbes	1964	United Kingdom	
Seconds	John Frankenheimer	1966	United States	
The Secret Ways	Phil Karlson	1961	United States	
The Servant	Joseph Losey	1963	United Kingdom	
Seven Days in May	John Frankenheimer	1964	United States	
Seven Thieves	Henry Hathaway	1960	United States	
Shock Corridor	Samuel Fuller	1963	United States	
Shoot the Piano Player	François Truffaut	1960	France	
The Sleeping Car Murders	Costa-Gavras	1965	France	
The Small World of Sammy Lee	Ken Hughes	1963	United Kingdom	
The Soft Skin	François Truffaut	1964	France	
Something Wild	Jack Garfein	1961	United States	
The Split	Gordon Flemyng	1968	United States	
Spotlight on a Murderer	Georges Franju	1961	France	
The Spy Who Came in from the Cold	Martin Ritt	1965	United Kingdom	
The St. Valentine's Day Massacre	Roger Corman	1967	United States	
The Strange Affair	David Greene	1968	United Kingdom	
Take Aim at the Police Van	Seijun Suzuki	1960	Japan	
Targets	Peter Bogdanovich	1968	United States	
Taste of Fear	Seth Holt	1961	United Kingdom	
Thérèse Desqueyroux	Georges Franju	1962	France	
They Shoot Horses, Don't They?	Sydney Pollack	1969	United States	
The Thief of Paris	Louis Malle	1967	France	
The Third Lover	Claude Chabrol	1962	France	
The Third Secret	Charles Crichton	1964	United Kingdom	
This Man Must Die	Claude Chabrol	1969	France	
The Thomas Crown Affair	Norman Jewison	1968	United States	
The Thousand Eyes of Dr. Mabuse	Fritz Lang	1960	West Germany	
Tokyo Drifter	Seijun Suzuki	1966	Japan	
Les Tontons flingueurs	Georges Lautner	1963	France	
Tony Rome	Gordon Douglas	1967	United States	
Trans-Europ-Express	Alain Robbe-Grillet	1966	France	
The Trial	Orson Welles	1962	United States	
The Truth	Henri-Georges Clouzot	1960	France	
Twilight of Honor	Boris Sagal	1963	United States	
Twisted Nerve	Roy Boulting	1968	United Kingdom	
Underworld U.S.A.	Samuel Fuller	1961	United States	
The Unfaithful Wife	Claude Chabrol	1969	France	
The Upper Hand	Denys de La Patellière	1966	France	
Uptight	Jules Dassin	1968	United States	
Victim	Basil Dearden	1961	United Kingdom	
Viridiana	Luis Buñuel	1961	Spain	
War Hunt	Denis Sanders	1962	United States	
Warning Shot	Buzz Kulik	1967	United States	
We Still Kill the Old Way	Elio Petri	1967	Italy	
Weekend	Jean-Luc Godard	1967	France	
Welcome to Hard Times	Burt Kennedy	1967	United States	
What Ever Happened to Aunt Alice?	Lee H. Katzin	1969	United States	
The Whip and the Body	Mario Bava	1963	Italy	
Who Killed Teddy Bear	Joseph Cates	1965	United States	
Why Must I Die?	Roy Del Ruth	1960	United States	
Youth of the Beast	Seijun Suzuki	1963	Japan	
Z	Costa-Gavras	1969	France	
Zero Focus	Yoshitaro Nomura	1961	Japan	

== List of films: 1970–1979 ==
Film	Director	Year	Country	Ref(s).
10 Rillington Place	Richard Fleischer	1971	United Kingdom	
99 and 44/100% Dead	John Frankenheimer	1974	United States	
Across 110th Street	Barry Shear	1972	United States	
All the President's Men	Alan J. Pakula	1976	United States	
The American Friend	Wim Wenders	1977	West Germany	
...And Justice for All.	Norman Jewison	1979	United States	
The Anderson Tapes	Sidney Lumet	1971	United States	
Assault on Precinct 13	John Carpenter	1976	United States	
Badge 373	Howard W. Koch	1973	United States	
Badlands	Terrence Malick	1973	United States	
The Big Fix	Jeremy Kagan	1978	United States	
The Big Sleep	Michael Winner	1978	United Kingdom, United States	
The Bird with the Crystal Plumage	Dario Argento	1970	Italy	
The Black Bird	David Giler	1975	United States	
The Burglars	Henri Verneuil	1971	France, Italy	
Black Eye	Jack Arnold	1974	United States	
Black Gunn	Robert Hartford-Davis	1972	United States	
Black Sunday	John Frankenheimer	1977	United States	
Blue Collar	Paul Schrader	1978	United States	
Le Boucher	Claude Chabrol	1970	France	
Bring Me the Head of Alfredo Garcia	Sam Peckinpah	1974	United States, Mexico	
The Brink's Job	William Friedkin	1978	United States	
Buster and Billie	Daniel Petrie	1974	United States	
Capricorn One	Peter Hyams	1977	United States	
Castle of Sand	Yoshitarō Nomura	1974	Japan	
Le Cercle Rouge	Jean-Pierre Melville	1970	France/Italy	
The Champ	Franco Zeffirelli	1979	United States	
Chandler	Paul Magwood	1971	United States	
Charley Varrick	Don Siegel	1973	United States	
The China Syndrome	James Bridges	1979	United States	
Chinatown	Roman Polanski	1974	United States	
The Choirboys	Robert Aldrich	1977	United States	
Coffy	Jack Hill	1973	United States	
The Conversation	Francis Ford Coppola	1974	United States	
The Conformist	Bernardo Bertolucci	1970	France, Italy, West Germany	
Cool Breeze	Barry Pollack	1972	United States	
Cotton Comes to Harlem	Ossie Davis	1970	United States	
Cuba	Richard Lester	1979	United States	
Deadly Strangers	Sidney Hayers	1975	United Kingdom	
Death Wish	Michael Winner	1974	United States	
Detroit 9000	Arthur Marks	1973	United States	
Dirty Harry	Don Siegel	1971	United States	
Dog Day Afternoon	Sidney Lumet	1975	United States	
The Domino Principle	Stanley Kramer	1977	United States	
The Driver	Walter Hill	1978	United States	
The Drowning Pool	Stuart Rosenberg	1975	United States	
Endless Night	Sidney Gilliat	1972	United Kingdom	
The Enforcer	James Fargo	1976	United States	
Escape to Nowhere	Claude Pinoteau	1973	France	
The Executioner	Sam Wanamaker	1970	United Kingdom	
Executive Action	David Miller	1973	United States	
Eyes of Laura Mars	Irvin Kershner	1978	United States	
Farewell, My Lovely	Dick Richards	1975	United States	
Fat City	John Huston	1972	United States	
Fingers	James Toback	1978	United States	
The First Great Train Robbery	Michael Crichton	1978	United Kingdom	
F.I.S.T.	Norman Jewison	1978	United States	
Foxy Brown	Jack Hill	1974	United States	
Framed	Phil Karlson	1975	United States	
The French Connection	William Friedkin	1971	United States	
French Connection II	John Frankenheimer	1975	United States	
Frenzy	Alfred Hitchcock	1972	United Kingdom	
Friday Foster	Arthur Marks	1975	United States	
The Friends of Eddie Coyle	Peter Yates	1973	United States	
The Fury	Brian De Palma	1978	United States	
The Gauntlet	Clint Eastwood	1977	United States	
Get Carter	Mike Hodges	1971	United Kingdom	
The Getaway	Sam Peckinpah	1972	United States	
Going Home	Herbert B. Leonard	1971	United States	
The Grissom Gang	Robert Aldrich	1971	United States	
The Groundstar Conspiracy	Lamont Johnson	1972	United States	
Gumshoe	Stephen Frears	1971	United Kingdom	
Hard Times	Walter Hill	1975	United States	
Hardcore	Paul Schrader	1979	United States	
Hell Up in Harlem	Larry Cohen	1973	United States	
Hickey & Boggs	Robert Culp	1972	United States	
Hit Man	George Armitage	1972	United States	
The "Human" Factor	Edward Dmytryk	1975	United States	
The Human Factor	Otto Preminger	1979	United Kingdom	
Hustle	Robert Aldrich	1975	United States	
I... comme Icare	Henri Verneuil	1979	France	
I Walk the Line	John Frankenheimer	1970	United States	
Jaguar	Lino Brocka	1979	Philippines	
The Killer Inside Me	Burt Kennedy	1976	United States	
The Killing of a Chinese Bookie	John Cassavetes	1976	United States	
Klute	Alan J. Pakula	1971	United States	
The Kremlin Letter	John Huston	1970	United States	
Last Embrace	Jonathan Demme	1979	United States	
The Last of Sheila	Herbert Ross	1973	United States	
The Late Show	Robert Benton	1977	United States	
The Liberation of L.B. Jones	William Wyler	1970	United States	
The Long Goodbye	Robert Altman	1973	United States	
The Looking Glass War	Frank Pierson	1970	United Kingdom	
The MacKintosh Man	John Huston	1973	United Kingdom	
Magnum Force	Ted Post	1973	United States	
Manila in the Claws of Light	Lino Brocka	1975	Philippines	
Mean Streets	Martin Scorsese	1973	United States	
Midnight Express	Alan Parker	1978	United States	
The Midnight Man	Roland Kibbee and Burt Lancaster	1974	United States	
Mikey and Nicky	Elaine May	1976	United States	
Money Movers	Bruce Beresford	1978	Australia	
The New Centurions	Richard Fleischer	1972	United States	
The Nickel Ride	Robert Mulligan	1974	United States	
Night Moves	Arthur Penn	1975	United States	
Obsession	Brian De Palma	1976	United States	
The Offence	Sidney Lumet	1972	United Kingdom	
The One Man Jury	Charles Martin	1978	United States	
The Onion Field	Harold Becker	1979	United States	
The Organization	Don Medford	1971	United States	
The Outfit	John Flynn	1973	United States	
The Parallax View	Alan J. Pakula	1974	United States	
The Passenger	Michelangelo Antonioni	1975	Italy, France, Spain	
Performance	Nicolas Roeg	1970	United Kingdom	
Play Misty for Me	Clint Eastwood	1971	United States	
Prime Cut	Michael Ritchie	1972	United States	
Pulp	Mike Hodges	1972	United Kingdom	
Rage	George C. Scott	1972	United States	
Remember My Name	Alan Rudolph	1978	United States	
Rider on the Rain	René Clément	1970	France	
Rolling Thunder	John Flynn	1977	United States	
The Seduction of Joe Tynan	Jerry Schatzberg	1979	United States	
Série noire	Alain Corneau	1979	France	
Serpico	Sidney Lumet	1973	United States	
Seven	Andy Sidaris	1979	United States	
Shaft	Gordon Parks	1971	United States	
Shamus	Buzz Kulik	1973	United States	
Sheba, Baby	William Girdler	1975	United States	
The Silent Partner	Daryl Duke	1978	Canada	
Sisters	Brian De Palma	1973	United States	
Sitting Target	Douglas Hickox	1972	United Kingdom	
Sorcerer	William Friedkin	1977	United States, Mexico	
Soylent Green	Richard Fleischer	1973	United States	
Special Delivery	Paul Wendkos	1976	United States	
The Stone Killer	Michael Winner	1973	United States	
Straight Time	Ulu Grosbard	1978	United States	
Super Fly	Gordon Parks Jr.	1972	United States	
Sweet Sweetback's Baadasssss Song	Melvin Van Peebles	1971	United States	
Sympathy for the Underdog	Kinji Fukasaku	1971	Japan	
The Take	Robert Hartford-Davis	1974	United States	
The Taking of Pelham One Two Three	Joseph Sargent	1974	United States	
Taxi Driver	Martin Scorsese	1976	United States	
They Call Me Mister Tibbs!	Gordon Douglas	1970	United States	
Thieves Like Us	Robert Altman	1974	United States	
Twilight's Last Gleaming	Robert Aldrich	1977	United States	
Vanishing Point	Richard C. Sarafian	1971	United States	
Vengeance Is Mine	Shōhei Imamura	1979	Japan	
Villain	Michael Tuchner	1971	United Kingdom	
Walking Tall	Phil Karlson	1973	United States	
White Line Fever	Jonathan Kaplan	1975	Canada, United States	
Winter Kills	William Richert	1979	United States	
The Yakuza	Sydney Pollack	1974	United States	
Yakuza Graveyard	Kinji Fukasaku	1976	Japan	

== List of films: 1980–1989 ==
Film	Director	Year	Country	Ref(s).
8 Million Ways to Die	Hal Ashby	1986	United States	
Absence of Malice	Sydney Pollack	1981	United States	
After Hours	Martin Scorsese	1985	United States	
Against All Odds	Taylor Hackford	1984	United States	
Agnes of God	Norman Jewison	1985	United States	
American Gigolo	Paul Schrader	1980	United States	
Angela Markado	Lino Brocka	1980	Philippines	
Angel Heart	Alan Parker	1987	United States	
At Close Range	James Foley	1986	United States	
Atlantic City	Louis Malle	1980	Canada/France	
Bad Boys	Rick Rosenthal	1983	United States	
Bad Timing	Nicolas Roeg	1980	United Kingdom	
Band of the Hand	Paul Michael Glaser	1986	United States	
Batman	Tim Burton	1989	United States	
The Beast to Die	Tōru Murakawa	1980	Japan	
The Bedroom Window	Curtis Hanson	1987	United States	
Best Seller	Larry Cohen	1987	United States	
Betrayed	Costa-Gavras	1988	United States	
A Better Tomorrow	John Woo	1986	Hong Kong	
The Big Easy	Jim McBride	1987	United States	
Black Rain	Ridley Scott	1989	United States	
Black Widow	Bob Rafelson	1987	United States	
Blade Runner	Ridley Scott	1982	United States	
Blue Thunder	John Badham	1983	United States	
Blue Velvet	David Lynch	1986	United States	
Blood Simple	Joel and Ethan Coen	1984	United States	
Blow Out	Brian De Palma	1981	United States	
Body Double	Brian De Palma	1984	United States	
Body Heat	Lawrence Kasdan	1981	United States	
The Border	Tony Richardson	1982	United States	
Breathless	Jim McBride	1983	United States	
Bulaklak sa City Jail	Mario O'Hara	1984	Philippines	
Chan Is Missing	Wayne Wang	1982	United States	
City on Fire	Ringo Lam	1987	Hong Kong	
Condemned	Mario O'Hara	1984	Philippines	
Cop	James B. Harris	1988	United States	
Crimes of Passion	Ken Russell	1984	United States	
Cruising	William Friedkin	1980	United States	
Cutter's Way	Ivan Passer	1981	United States	
Dapat Ka Bang Mahalin?	Emmanuel Borlaza	1984	Philippines	
Dead Men Don't Wear Plaid	Carl Reiner	1982	United States	
The Dead Pool	Buddy Van Horn	1988	United States	
Defiance	John Flynn	1980	United States	
D.O.A.	Rocky Morton and Annabel Jankel	1988	United States	
Dressed to Kill	Brian De Palma	1980	United States	
The Exterminator	James Glickenhaus	1980	United States	
Experience	Lino Brocka	1984	Philippines	
Eyewitness	Peter Yates	1981	United States	
Fatal Attraction	Adrian Lyne	1987	United States	
Fear City	Abel Ferrara	1984	United States	
The First Deadly Sin	Brian G. Hutton	1980	United States	
Frantic	Roman Polanski	1988	United States	
Gloria	John Cassavetes	1980	United States	
Hammett	Wim Wenders	1982	United States	
Hidden City	Stephen Poliakoff	1987	United Kingdom	
The Hit	Stephen Frears	1984	United Kingdom	
House of Games	David Mamet	1987	United States	
The House on Carroll Street	Peter Yates	1988	United States	
Imortal	Eddie Garcia	1989	Philippines	
Itanong Mo sa Buwan	Chito S. Roño	1988	Philippines	
I, the Jury	Richard T. Heffron	1982	United States	
Jagged Edge	Richard Marquand	1985	United States	
Johnny Handsome	Walter Hill	1989	United States	
Kill Me Again	John Dahl	1989	United States	
The Killer	John Woo	1989	Hong Kong	
Little Nikita	Richard Benjamin	1988	United States	
The Long Good Friday	John Mackenzie	1980	United Kingdom	
Manhunter	Michael Mann	1986	United States	
Mike's Murder	James Bridges	1984	United States	
Mona Lisa	Neil Jordan	1986	United Kingdom	
The Morning After	Sidney Lumet	1986	United States	
Ms. 45	Abel Ferrara	1981	United States	
Murphy's Law	J. Lee Thompson	1986	United States	
Night of the Juggler	Robert Butler	1980	United States	
Nighthawks	Bruce Malmuth	1981	United States	
No Mercy	Richard Pearce	1986	United States	
No Way Out	Roger Donaldson	1987	United States	
Out of Bounds	Richard Tuggle	1986	United States	
Police	Maurice Pialat	1985	France	
The Postman Always Rings Twice	Bob Rafelson	1981	United States	
Prince of the City	Sidney Lumet	1981	United States	
Quicksilver	Thomas Michael Donnelly	1986	United States	
Raging Bull	Martin Scorsese	1980	United States	
Scarface	Brian De Palma	1983	United States	
Sea of Love	Harold Becker	1989	United States	
Sharky's Machine	Burt Reynolds	1981	United States	
Silent Rage	Michael Miller	1982	United States	
Slam Dance	Wayne Wang	1987	United States	
Someone to Watch Over Me	Ridley Scott	1987	United States, United Kingdom	
Still of the Night	Robert Benton	1982	United States	
Stormy Monday	Mike Figgis	1988	United Kingdom	
Sudden Impact	Clint Eastwood	1983	United States	
Tagos ng Dugo	Maryo J. de los Reyes	1987	Philippines	
The Fourth Man (1983 film)	Paul Verhoeven	1983	Netherlands	
The Terminator	James Cameron	1984	United States	
T-Bird at Ako	Danny Zialcita	1982	Philippines	
Thief	Michael Mann	1981	United States	
Tightrope	Richard Tuggle	1984	United States	
To Live and Die in L.A.	William Friedkin	1985	United States	
To Love Again	Danny Zialcita	1983	Philippines	
Trouble in Mind	Alan Rudolph	1985	United States	
True Confessions	Ulu Grosbard	1981	United States	
Union City	Marcus Reichert	1980	United States	
Videodrome	David Cronenberg	1983	Canada	
Violent Cop	Takeshi Kitano	1989	Japan	
Who Framed Roger Rabbit	Robert Zemeckis	1988	United States	
Witness	Peter Weir	1985	United States	
Year of the Dragon	Michael Cimino	1985	United States	
Yokohama BJ Blues	Eiichi Kudo	1981	Japan	

== List of films: 1990–1999 ==
Film	Director	Year	Country	Ref(s).
12 Monkeys	Terry Gilliam	1995	United States	
Affliction	Paul Schrader	1997	United States	
After Dark, My Sweet	James Foley	1990	United States	
Arlington Road	Mark Pellington	1999	United States	
Bad Influence	Curtis Hanson	1990	United States	
Bad Lieutenant	Abel Ferrara	1992	United States	
Basic Instinct	Paul Verhoeven	1992	United States	
Batman Returns	Tim Burton	1992	United States	
Batman: Mask of the Phantasm	Bruce Timm	1993	United States	
Belly	Hype Williams	1998	United States	
Best Laid Plans	Mike Barker	1999	United States	
The Big Lebowski	Joel and Ethan Coen	1998	United States, United Kingdom	
Blink	Michael Apted	1994	United States	
Blood and Wine	Bob Rafelson	1996	United States	
Blue Steel	Kathryn Bigelow	1990	United States	
Bound	Lana and Lilly Wachowski	1996	United States	
Boys Don't Cry	Kimberly Peirce	1999	United States	
Bugsy	Barry Levinson	1991	United States	
Cape Fear	Martin Scorsese	1991	United States	
Carlito's Way	Brian De Palma	1993	United States	
La Cérémonie	Claude Chabrol	1995	France	
China Moon	John Bailey	1994	United States	
Clockers	Spike Lee	1995	United States	
Cop Land	James Mangold	1997	United States	
Croupier	Mike Hodges	1998	United Kingdom	
The Crow	Alex Proyas	1994	United States	
Cure	Kiyoshi Kurosawa	1997	Japan	
Dark City	Alex Proyas	1998	United States, Australia	
Dead Again	Kenneth Branagh	1991	United States	
Dead Presidents	Albert and Allen Hughes	1995	United States	
Deceiver	Jonas Pate and Josh Pate	1997	United States	
Deep Cover	Bill Duke	1992	United States	
Deep Crimson	Arturo Ripstein	1996	Mexico	
Delusion	Carl Colpaert	1991	United States	
Desperate Hours	Michael Cimino	1990	United States	
Devil in a Blue Dress	Carl Franklin	1995	United States	
Diary of a Hitman	Roy London	1991	United States	
Dick Tracy	Warren Beatty	1990	United States	
Donnie Brasco	Mike Newell	1997	United States	
Emma Salazar Case	Jose Javier Reyes	1991	Philippines	
Face/Off	John Woo	1997	United States	
Fallen	Gregory Hoblit	1998	United States	
Fallen Angels	Wong Kar-wai	1995	Hong Kong	
Fargo	Joel and Ethan Coen	1996	United States, United Kingdom	
Fear	James Foley	1996	United States	
La Femme Nikita	Luc Besson	1990	France/Italy	
Fight Club	David Fincher	1999	United States	
Final Analysis	Phil Joanou	1992	United States	
Flesh and Bone	Steve Kloves	1993	United States	
Following	Christopher Nolan	1998	United Kingdom	
Foreign Land	Walter Salles and Daniela Thomas	1996	Brazil	
The Game	David Fincher	1997	United States	
Gattaca	Andrew Niccol	1997	United States	
The Getaway	Roger Donaldson	1994	United States	
Ghost Dog: The Way of the Samurai	Jim Jarmusch	1999	United States	
The Glass Shield	Charles Burnett	1994	United States	
Gloria	Sidney Lumet	1999	United States	
The Grifters	Stephen Frears	1990	United States	
Guncrazy	Tamra Davis	1992	United States	
La Haine	Mathieu Kassovitz	1995	France	
Hana-bi	Takeshi Kitano	1997	Japan	
Hard Boiled	John Woo	1992	Hong Kong	
Hard Eight	Paul Thomas Anderson	1996	United States	
Heat	Michael Mann	1995	United States	
Homicide	David Mamet	1991	United States	
The Hot Spot	Dennis Hopper	1990	United States	
Ikaw Naman ang Iiyak	Joel Lamangan	1996	Philippines	
In the Line of Fire	Wolfgang Petersen	1993	United States	
Insomnia	Erik Skjoldbjærg	1997	Norway	
Internal Affairs	Mike Figgis	1990	United States	
Jackie Brown	Quentin Tarantino	1997	United States	
The Kill-Off	Maggie Greenwald	1990	United States	
King of New York	Abel Ferrara	1990	United States	
A Kiss Before Dying	James Dearden	1991	United States	
Kiss of Death	Barbet Schroeder	1995	United States	
Kiss or Kill	Bill Bennett	1997	Australia	
The Krays	Peter Medak	1990	United Kingdom	
L.A. Confidential	Curtis Hanson	1997	United States	
The Last Seduction	John Dahl	1994	United States	
Léon: The Professional	Luc Besson	1994	France	
Lethal Weapon 3	Richard Donner	1992	United States	
Liebestraum	Mike Figgis	1991	United States	
Light Sleeper	Paul Schrader	1992	United States	
The Limey	Steven Soderbergh	1999	United States	
Live Flesh	Pedro Almodóvar	1997	Spain	
Lock, Stock and Two Smoking Barrels	Guy Ritchie	1998	United Kingdom	
Lone Star	John Sayles	1996	United States	
Lord of Illusions	Clive Barker	1995	United States	
Lost Highway	David Lynch	1997	United States	
Love Crimes	Lizzie Borden	1992	United States	
Malice	Harold Becker	1993	United States	
The Matrix	Lana and Lilly Wachowski	1999	Australia, United States	
Menace II Society	Albert and Allen Hughes	1993	United States	
Miami Blues	George Armitage	1990	United States	
Miller's Crossing	Joel and Ethan Coen	1990	United States	
Mulholland Falls	Lee Tamahori	1996	United States	
Narrow Margin	Peter Hyams	1990	United States	
New Jack City	Melvin Van Peebles	1991	United States	
Night and the City	Irwin Winkler	1992	United States	
Night Train	Les Bernstien	1999	United States	
The Ninth Gate	Roman Polanski	1999	United States	
One False Move	Carl Franklin	1992	United States	
Out of Sight	Steven Soderbergh	1998	United States	
Pacific Heights	John Schlesinger	1990	United States	
Palmetto	Volker Schlöndorff	1998	United States	
El Patrullero	Alex Cox	1991	Mexico	
Payback	Brian Helgeland	1999	United States	
Pi	Darren Aronofsky	1998	United States	
The Player	Robert Altman	1992	United States	
Point Break	Kathryn Bigelow	1991	United States	
Poison Ivy	Katt Shea	1992	United States	
Poodle Springs	Bob Rafelson	1998	United States	
The Public Eye	Howard Franklin	1992	United States	
Pulp Fiction	Quentin Tarantino	1994	United States	
Pusher	Nicolas Winding Refn	1996	Denmark	
The Rapture	Michael Tolkin	1991	United States	
Red Rock West	John Dahl	1993	United States	
Reservoir Dogs	Quentin Tarantino	1992	United States	
Revenge	Tony Scott	1990	United States, Mexico	
Romeo Is Bleeding	Peter Medak	1993	United States	
Ronin	John Frankenheimer	1998	United States	
Rush	Lili Fini Zanuck	1991	United States	
Serpent's Path	Kiyoshi Kurosawa	1998	Japan	
Set It Off	F. Gary Gray	1994	United States	
Seven	David Fincher	1995	United States	
Shallow Grave	Danny Boyle	1994	United Kingdom	
Shattered	Wolfgang Petersen	1991	United States	
The Silence of the Lambs	Jonathan Demme	1991	United States	
Simpatico	Matthew Warchus	1999	United States	
A Simple Plan	Sam Raimi	1998	United States	
Sleeping with the Enemy	Joseph Ruben	1991	United States	
Sling Blade	Billy Bob Thornton	1996	United States	
Sonatine	Takeshi Kitano	1993	Japan	
The Spanish Prisoner	David Mamet	1997	United States	
Strange Days	Kathryn Bigelow	1995	United States	
Suture	Scott McGehee and David Siegel	1993	United States	
Swoon	Tom Kalin	1992	United States	
The Talented Mr. Ripley	Anthony Minghella	1999	United States	
The Temp	Tom Holland	1993	United States	
Things to Do in Denver When You're Dead	Gary Fleder	1995	United States	
This World, Then the Fireworks	Michael Oblowitz	1997	United States	
True Romance	Tony Scott	1993	United States	
Twilight	Robert Benton	1998	United States	
Twin Peaks: Fire Walk with Me	David Lynch	1992	United States	
The Two Jakes	Jack Nicholson	1990	United States	
U Turn	Oliver Stone	1997	United States	
The Underneath	Steven Soderbergh	1995	United States	
Unlawful Entry	Jonathan Kaplan	1992	United States	
The Usual Suspects	Bryan Singer	1995	United States	
Where the Day Takes You	Marc Rocco	1992	United States	
White Sands	Roger Donaldson	1992	United States	
Wild at Heart	David Lynch	1990	United States	
Wild Things	John McNaughton	1998	United States	
The X-Files	Rob Bowman	1998	United States	
Zero Effect	Jake Kasdan	1998	United States	

== List of films: 2000–2009 ==
Film	Director	Year	Country	Ref(s).
25th Hour	Spike Lee	2002	United States	
American Gangster	Ridley Scott	2007	United States	
American Psycho	Mary Harron	2000	United States	
The Assassination of Richard Nixon	Niels Mueller	2004	United States	
El Aura	Fabián Bielinsky	2005	Argentina	
Bad Education	Pedro Almodóvar	2004	Spain	
Bad Lieutenant: Port of Call New Orleans	Werner Herzog	2009	United States	
Baise-moi	Virginie Despentes and Coralie Trinh Thi	2000	France	
Balahibong Pusa	Yam Laranas	2001	Philippines	
Basic Instinct 2	Michael Caton-Jones	2006	United Kingdom, United States, Germany, Spain	
Batman Begins	Christopher Nolan	2005	United States	
The Beat That My Heart Skipped	Jacques Audiard	2005	France	
Before the Devil Knows You're Dead	Sidney Lumet	2007	United States	
Beyond a Reasonable Doubt	Peter Hyams	2009	United States	
A Bittersweet Life	Kim Jee-woon	2005	South Korea	
The Black Dahlia	Brian De Palma	2006	United States	
Blind Shaft	Li Yang	2003	China	
The Bourne Identity	Doug Liman	2002	United States	
Brick	Rian Johnson	2005	United States	
Caché	Michael Haneke	2005	France	
Cavite	Neill Dela Llana and Ian Gamazon	2005	Philippines, United States	
Circus	Rob Walker	2000	United Kingdom, United States	
City of God	Fernando Meirelles and Kátia Lund	2002	Brazil	
Collateral	Michael Mann	2004	United States	
The Consequences of Love	Paolo Sorrentino	2004	Italy	
The Cooler	Wayne Kramer	2003	United States	
Dark Blue	Ron Shelton	2002	United States	
Dark Country	Thomas Jane	2009	United States	
The Dark Knight	Christopher Nolan	2008	United Kingdom, United States	
Dead Man's Shoes	Shane Meadows	2004	United Kingdom	
Dead Time: Kala	Joko Anwar	2007	Indonesia	
Deception	Marcel Langenegger	2008	United States	
The Deep End	Scott McGehee and David Siegel	2001	United States	
The Departed	Martin Scorsese	2006	United States	
Derailed	Mikael Håfström	2005	United States	
Dos Ekis	Erik Matti	2001	Philippines	
Duplicity	Tony Gilroy	2009	United States	
Eastern Promises	David Cronenberg	2007	United Kingdom, Canada	
Ek Hasina Thi	Sriram Raghavan	2004	India	
Enough	Michael Apted	2002	United States	
Femme Fatale	Brian De Palma	2002	United States	
The Girl with the Dragon Tattoo	Niels Arden Oplev	2009	Sweden	
The Glass House	Daniel Sackheim	2001	United States	
Gone Baby Gone	Ben Affleck	2007	United States	
Heist	David Mamet	2001	United States	
A History of Violence	David Cronenberg	2005	United States	
Hollywoodland	Allen Coulter	2006	United States	
Hostage	Florent Emilio Siri	2005	United States	
I, Robot	Alex Proyas	2004	United States	
I'll Sleep When I'm Dead	Mike Hodges	2003	United Kingdom	
In Bruges	Martin McDonagh	2008	United Kingdom	
In the Cut	Jane Campion	2003	United States	
Infernal Affairs	Andrew Lau and Alan Mak	2002	Hong Kong	
Inside Man	Spike Lee	2006	United States	
Insomnia	Christopher Nolan	2002	United States	
Irréversible	Gaspar Noé	2002	France	
Johnny Gaddaar	Sriram Raghavan	2007	India	
Just Another Love Story	Ole Bornedal	2007	Denmark	
Kill Bill: Volume 1	Quentin Tarantino	2003	United States	
Kill Bill: Volume 2	Quentin Tarantino	2004	United States	
Kiss Kiss Bang Bang	Shane Black	2005	United States	
Klopka	Srdan Golubović	2007	Serbia	
Lady Vengeance	Park Chan-wook	2005	South Korea	
Lantana	Ray Lawrence	2001	Australia	
La Vida Rosa	Chito S. Roño	2001	Philippines	
Layer Cake	Matthew Vaughn	2004	United Kingdom	
Lorna's Silence	Jean-Pierre and Luc Dardenne	2008	Belgium, Italy, Germany	
Lower City	Sérgio Machado	2005	Brazil	
Lucky Number Slevin	Paul McGuigan	2006	United States	
Lust, Caution	Ang Lee	2007	United States, China, Taiwan	
The Machinist	Brad Anderson	2004	Spain	
Mad Detective	Johnnie To and Wai Ka-Fai	2007	Hong Kong	
The Man from London	Béla Tarr and Ágnes Hranitzky	2007	Hungary, France, Germany	
The Man Who Wasn't There	Joel and Ethan Coen	2001	United States	
The Manchurian Candidate	Jonathan Demme	2004	United States	
Manila Skies	Raymond Red	2009	Philippines, United States	
Marital Rape	Neal 'Buboy' Tan	2001	Philippines	
Match Point	Woody Allen	2005	United Kingdom, United States, Luxembourg	
Max Payne	John Moore	2008	United States	
Memento	Christopher Nolan	2000	United States	
Memories of Murder	Bong Joon-ho	2003	South Korea	
Merci pour le chocolat	Claude Chabrol	2000	France	
Miami Vice	Michael Mann	2006	United States	
Million Dollar Baby	Clint Eastwood	2004	United States	
Minority Report	Steven Spielberg	2002	United States	
Mother	Bong Joon-ho	2009	South Korea	
Mulholland Drive	David Lynch	2001	United States	
Mystic River	Clint Eastwood	2003	United States	
Narc	Joe Carnahan	2002	United States	
Nine Queens	Fabián Bielinsky	2000	Argentina	
No Country For Old Men	Joel and Ethan Coen	2007	United States	
Oldboy	Park Chan-wook	2003	South Korea	
One Nite in Mongkok	Derek Yee	2004	Hong Kong	
Out of Time	Carl Franklin	2003	United States	
Panic Room	David Fincher	2002	United States	
The Pledge	Sean Penn	2001	United States	
Public Enemies	Michael Mann	2009	United States	
Pusher II: With Blood on My Hands	Nicolas Winding Refn	2004	Denmark, United Kingdom	
Pusher III: I’m the Angel of Death	Nicolas Winding Refn	2005	Denmark	
Reindeer Games	John Frankenheimer	2000	United States	
Renaissance	Christian Volckman	2006	France	
Ripley's Game	Liliana Cavani	2002	Italy	
Road to Perdition	Sam Mendes	2002	United States	
The Salton Sea	D. J. Caruso	2002	United States	
A Scanner Darkly	Richard Linklater	2006	United States	
Sexy Beast	Jonathan Glazer	2000	United Kingdom	
Shinjuku Incident	Derek Yee	2009	Hong Kong	
Sin City	Frank Miller and Robert Rodriguez	2005	United States	
The Spirit	Frank Miller	2008	United States	
State of Play	Kevin MacDonald	2009	United States	
Suspect Zero	E. Elias Merhige	2004	United States	
Suzhou River	Lou Ye	2000	China	
Sympathy for Mr. Vengeance	Park Chan-wook	2002	South Korea	
Tell No One	Guillaume Canet	2006	France	
Three Monkeys	Nuri Bilge Ceylan	2008	Turkey	
The Town Is Quiet	Robert Guédiguian	2000	France	
Training Day	Antoine Fuqua	2001	United States	
Trapped	Luis Mandoki	2002	United States, Germany	
The Village	M. Night Shyamalan	2004	United States	
Watchmen	Zack Snyder	2009	United States	
The Way of the Gun	Christopher McQuarrie	2000	United States	
Where the Truth Lies	Atom Egoyan	2005	Canada	
The Yards	James Gray	2000	United States	
Zodiac	David Fincher	2007	United States	

== List of films: 2010–2019 ==
Film	Director	Year	Country	Ref(s).
A Land Imagined	Yeo Siew Hua	2018	Singapore, France, Netherlands	
Aa Drushya	Shiva Ganesh	2019	India	
Aake	K. M. Chaitanya	2017	India	
Aaranya Kaandam	Thiagarajan Kumararaja	2011	India	
Alois Nebel	Tomáš Luňák	2011	Czech Republic	
The American	Anton Corbijn	2010	United States	
American Dreamer	Derrick Borte	2018	United States	
Animal Kingdom	David Michôd	2010	Australia	
Anon	Andrew Niccol	2018	United Kingdom, United States	
Anti Matter	Keir Burrows	2017	United Kingdom	
Ash Is Purest White	Jia Zhangke	2018	China	
Asura: The City of Madness	Kim Sung-su	2016	South Korea	
B.A. Pass	Ajay Bahl	2013	India	
Badlapur	Sriram Raghavan	2015	India	
Bad Times at the El Royale	Drew Goddard	2018	United States	
Bad Turn Worse	Zeke and Simon Hawkins	2014	United States	
The Bag Man	David Grovic	2014	United States	
Bastards	Claire Denis	2013	France/Germany	
Black Coal, Thin Ice	Diao Yinan	2014	China	
Blade Runner 2049	Denis Villeneuve	2017	United States	
Blow the Man Down	Bridget Savage Cole and Danielle Krudy	2019	United States	
Blue Ruin	Jeremy Saulnier	2014	United States	
Bornoporichoy	Mainak Bhowmick	2019	India	
Brawl in Cell Block 99	S. Craig Zahler	2017	United States	
Brighton Rock	Rowan Joffé	2011	United Kingdom	
Broken City	Allen Hughes	2013	United States	
Burning	Lee Chang-dong	2018	South Korea	
Burning Kiss	Robbie Studsor	2018	Australia	
Cities of Last Things	Ho Wi Ding	2018	Taiwan, China, France, United States	
Cold in July	Jim Mickle	2014	United States	
Concrete Night	Pirjo Honkasalo	2013	Finland, Sweden, Denmark	
Cop Car	Jon Watts	2015	United States	
The Dark Knight Rises	Christopher Nolan	2012	United Kingdom, United States	
Destroyer	Karyn Kusama	2018	United States	
Detour	Christopher Smith	2016	United Kingdom, South Africa	
Disappearance at Clifton Hill	Albert Shin	2019	Canada	
Dragged Across Concrete	S. Craig Zahler	2018	United States	
The Driftless Area	Zachary Sluser	2016	United States, Canada	
Drive	Nicolas Winding Refn	2011	United States	
Drum	Keywan Karimi	2016	Iran/France	
Earthquake Bird	Wash Westmoreland	2019	United States, United Kingdom	
Elena	Andrey Zvyagintsev	2011	Russia	
Elle	Paul Verhoeven	2016	France/Germany	
Enemy	Denis Villeneuve	2013	United States, United Kingdom	
Ex Machina	Alex Garland	2015	United States, United Kingdom	
First Reformed	Paul Schrader	2018	United States	
Flatland	Jenna Bass	2019	South Africa	
Frank & Lola	Matthew Ross	2016	United States	
Gangnam Blues	Yoo Ha	2015	South Korea	
Gemini	Aaron Katz	2018	United States	
The Ghost Writer	Roman Polanski	2010	United Kingdom, France, Germany	
The Girl with the Dragon Tattoo	David Fincher	2011	United States, Sweden	
Glass Chin	Noah Buschel	2015	United States	
Gone Girl	David Fincher	2014	United States	
Good Time	Josh and Benny Safdie	2017	United States	
The Handmaiden	Park Chan-wook	2016	South Korea	
Have a Nice Day	Liu Jian	2018	China	
Hell or High Water	David Mackenzie	2016	United States	
Hold the Dark	Jeremy Saulnier	2018	United States	
Hot Summer Nights	Elijah Bynum	2018	United States	
I Saw the Devil	Kim Jee-woon	2010	South Korea	
In the Shadow	David Ondříček	2012	Czech Republic	
In the Shadow of the Moon	Jim Mickle	2019	United States	
Inception	Christopher Nolan	2010	United Kingdom, United States	
Inherent Vice	Paul Thomas Anderson	2014	United States	
John Wick	Chad Stahelski	2014	United States	
John Wick: Chapter 2	Chad Stahelski	2017	United States	
John Wick: Chapter 3 – Parabellum	Chad Stahelski	2019	United States	
Josie	Eric England	2018	United States	
Kill Chain	Ken Sanzel	2019	United States	
Kill List	Ben Wheatley	2011	United Kingdom	
The Killer Inside Me	Michael Winterbottom	2010	United States	
Killer Joe	William Friedkin	2012	United States	
Killing Them Softly	Andrew Dominik	2012	United States	
Knives and Skin	Jennifer Reeder	2019	United States	
Let the Corpses Tan	Hélène Cattet and Bruno Forzani	2017	Belgium, France	
Long Day's Journey into Night	Bi Gan	2018	China	
The Looming Storm	Dong Yue	2017	China	
Looper	Rian Johnson	2012	United States	
Lost Angelas	William Wayne	2019	United States	
Lost River	Ryan Gosling	2014	United States	
Magical Girl	Carlos Vermut	2014	Spain	
The Man from Nowhere	Lee Jeong-beom	2010	South Korea	
Man from Reno	Dave Boyle	2015	United States	
Manhattan Night	Brian DeCubellis	2016	United States	
Manila Kingpin: The Asiong Salonga Story	Tikoy Aguiluz	2011	Philippines	
The Merciless	Byun Sung-hyun	2017	South Korea	
Miss Bala	Gerardo Naranjo	2011	Mexico	
A Morass	Shane James Bordas	2011	United Kingdom	
Motherless Brooklyn	Edward Norton	2019	United States	
Mute	Duncan Jones	2018	United Kingdom, Germany	
The Nice Guys	Shane Black	2016	United States	
Nightcrawler	Dan Gilroy	2014	United States	
Night Moves	Kelly Reichardt	2014	United States	
The Nile Hilton Incident	Tarik Saleh	2017	Sweden, Egypt, Denmark, Germany	
Nocturnal Animals	Tom Ford	2016	United States	
No Other Woman	Ruel S. Bayani	2011	Philippines	
Only God Forgives	Nicolas Winding Refn	2013	Denmark/France	
On the Job	Erik Matti	2013	Philippines	
Out of Blue	Carol Morley	2019	United States, United Kingdom	
Outrage	Takeshi Kitano	2010	Japan	
Paradox	Wilson Yip	2017	Hong Kong	
The Persian Connection	Daniel Grove	2017	United States	
Phoenix	Christian Petzold	2014	Germany	
Pickings	Usher Morgan	2018	United States	
Piercing	Nicolas Pesce	2019	United States	
The Place Beyond the Pines	Derek Cianfrance	2013	United States	
Pocket Listing	Conor Allyn	2016	United States	
The Poison Rose	George Gallo and Francesco Cinquemani	2019	United States	
Polar	Jonas Åkerlund	2019	United States, Germany, Canada	
Prisoners	Denis Villeneuve	2013	United States	
Queen & Slim	Melina Matsoukas	2019	United States	
A Quiet Life	Claudio Cupellini	2010	Italy	
Real	Lee Sa-rang	2017	South Korea	
Richie	Gautham Ramachandran	2017	India	
Rojo	Benjamín Naishtat	2019	Argentina	
Roman J. Israel, Esq.	Dan Gilroy	2017	United States	
Señorita	Isabel Sandoval	2011	Philippines	
Serenity	Steven Knight	2019	United States	
Shanghai	Mikael Håfström	2010	United States, China	
Shutter Island	Martin Scorsese	2010	United States	
Sin Island	Gino M. Santos	2018	Philippines	
Small Town Crime	Esholm and Ian Nelms	2018	United States	
Some Guy Who Kills People	Jack Perez	2012	United States	
Spring Breakers	Harmony Korine	2012	United States	
State Like Sleep	Meredith Danluck	2019	United States	
Strangled	Árpád Sopsits	2016	Hungary	
Sunrise	Partho Sen-Gupta	2014	India, France	
Sweet Virginia	Jamie M. Dagg	2017	United States, Canada	
Taniel	Garo Berberian	2017	United Kingdom, Armenia	
Tattoo of Revenge	Julián Hernández	2019	Mexico	
Terminal	Vaughn Stein	2018	Hong Kong, United Kingdom, Ireland, Hungary, United States	
Thin Ice	Jill Sprecher	2012	United States	
Too Late	Dennis Hauck	2016	United States	
A Touch of Sin	Jia Zhangke	2013	China, Japan, France	
The Town	Ben Affleck	2010	United States	
Traces of Sin	Kei Ishikawa	2017	Japan	
Trance	Danny Boyle	2013	United Kingdom	
Transpecos	Greg Kwedar	2016	United States	
Trouble Is My Business	Tom Konkle	2018	United States	
The Trough	Nick Cheung	2018	Hong Kong, China	
Uncut Gems	Josh and Benny Safdie	2019	United States	
Under the Silver Lake	David Robert Mitchell	2018	United States	
Upgrade	Leigh Whannell	2018	Australia, United States	
Victoria	Sebastian Schipper	2015	Germany	
Vikram Vedha	Pushkar–Gayatri	2017	India	
Villain	Lee Sang-il	2010	Japan	
The Villainess	Jung Byung-gil	2017	South Korea	
A Walk Among the Tombstones	Scott Frank	2014	United States	
Walking Too Fast	Radim Špaček	2010	Czech Republic	
The Whistlers	Corneliu Porumboiu	2019	Romania, France, Germany	
Who Killed Cock Robin	Cheng Wei-hao	2017	Taiwan	
Widows	Steve McQueen	2018	United States	
The Wild Goose Lake	Diao Yinan	2019	China/France	
Wind River	Taylor Sheridan	2017	United States	
Winter's Bone	Debra Granik	2010	United States	
The Yellow Sea	Na Hong-jin	2010	South Korea	
You Were Never Really Here	Lynne Ramsay	2017	United Kingdom, United States, France	

== List of films: 2020–2029 ==
Film	Director	Year	Country	Ref(s).
Abang Adik	Jin Ong Lay	2023	Malaysia	
The Actor	Duke Johnson	2025	United States	
Adverse	Brian Metcalf	2021	United States	
Are You Lonesome Tonight?	Wen Shipei	2021	China	
Arishadvarga	Arvind Kamath	2020	India	
The Batman	Matt Reeves	2022	United States	
Brut Force	Eve Symington	2022	United States	
Calm with Horses	Nick Rowland	2020	Ireland	
The Card Counter	Paul Schrader	2021	United States	
Caught Stealing	Darren Aronofsky	2025	United States	
City of Love	Èric Boadella	2023	United States	
Crime 101	Bart Layton	2026	United States	
Decision to Leave	Park Chan-wook	2022	South Korea	
A Desert	Joshua Erkman	2025	United States	
Eileen	William Oldroyd	2023	United States, United Kingdom	
Emily the Criminal	John Patton Ford	2022	United States	
The Empty Man	David Prior	2020	United States	
Fatale	Deon Taylor	2020	United States	
Femme	Sam H. Freeman and Ng Choon Ping	2023	United Kingdom	
Flinch	Cameron Van Hoy	2021	United States	
The G	Karl R. Hearne	2024	Canada	
Gazer	Ryan J. Sloan	2025	United States	
Hand Rolled Cigarette	Kin Long Chan	2020	China	
Havoc	Gareth Evans	2025	United States, United Kingdom	
Highest 2 Lowest	Spike Lee	2025	United States	
Hit Man	Richard Linklater	2024	United States	
Holy Spider	Ali Abbasi	2022	Germany, France, Denmark, Sweden	
Honey Don't!	Ethan Coen	2025	United States, United Kingdom	
Hypnotic	Robert Rodriguez	2023	United States	
I'm Your Woman	Julia Hart	2020	United States	
John Wick: Chapter 4	Chad Stahelski	2023	United States	
Kabadadaari	Pradeep Krishnamoorthy	2021	India	
Kapatadhaari	Pradeep Krishnamoorthy	2021	India	
The Kid Detective	Evan Morgan	2020	Canada	
The Kill Room	Nicol Paone	2023	United States	
The Killer	David Fincher	2023	United States	
Killers of the Flower Moon	Martin Scorsese	2023	United States	
Knox Goes Away	Michael Keaton	2024	United States	
Lake George	Jeffrey Reiner	2024	United States	
Last Moment of Clarity	James and Colin Krisel	2020	United States	
Last Night in Soho	Edgar Wright	2021	United Kingdom	
The Last Stop in Yuma County	Francis Galluppi	2024	United States	
The Last Victim	Naveen A Chathapuram	2021	United States	
The Lesson	Alice Troughton	2023	United Kingdom	
Limbo	Soi Cheang	2021	China, Hong Kong	
Limbo	Ivan Sen	2023	Australia	
The Little Things	John Lee Hancock	2021	United States	
Longlegs	Oz Perkins	2024	United States	
Love Lies Bleeding	Rose Glass	2024	United States, United Kingdom	
Magpie	Sam Yates	2024	United Kingdom	
Marco	Haneef Adeni	2024	Malaysia	
Marlowe	Neil Jordan	2023	France, Ireland, Spain	
Master Gardener	Paul Schrader	2023	United States	
MaXXXine	Ti West	2024	United States	
Michael	Ranjit Jeyakodi	2023	India	
Motel Destino	Karim Aïnouz	2024	Brazil, France, Germany	
Night in Paradise	Park Hoon-jung	2021	South Korea	
Nightmare Alley	Guillermo del Toro	2021	United States	
No Sudden Move	Steven Soderbergh	2021	United States	
Only the River Flows	Wei Shujun	2023	China	
Pamfir	Dmytro Sukholytkyy-Sobchuk	2022	Ukraine, Poland, France, Luxembourg	
Pig	Michael Sarnoski	2021	United States	
Poolman	Chris Pine	2023	United States	
Preparations to Be Together for an Unknown Period of Time	Lili Horvát	2020	Hungary	
Primetime	Lance Oppenheim	2026	United States	
Reminiscence	Lisa Joy	2021	United States	
Reptile	Grant Singer	2023	United States	
Sharper	Benjamin Caron	2023	United States	
Spears	Gerard Lough	2022	Ireland	
A State of Madness	Leticia Tonos	2020	Dominican Republic	
Synchronic	Justin Benson and Aaron Moorhead	2020	United States	
To Catch a Killer	Damián Szifron	2023	United States	
The Universal Theory	Timm Kröger	2023	Germany, Austria, Switzerland	
Vengeance	B. J. Novak	2022	United States	
The Virtuoso	Nick Stagliano	2021	United States	
The Voyeurs	Michael Mohan	2022	United States	
Wildland	Jeanette Nordahl	2020	Denmark	
Windfall	Charlie McDowell	2022	United States	
Wrath of Man	Guy Ritchie	2021	United Kingdom, United States	

== See also ==
- List of film noir titles

== Bibliography ==
- Ballinger, Alexander; Graydon, Danny (2007). The Rough Guide to Film Noir. London & New York: Rough Guides. ISBN 978-1-84353-474-7.
- Conard, Mark T.; ed. (2009). The Philosophy of Neo-Noir. Lexington: University Press of Kentucky. ISBN 081319217X.
- Hogan, David J. (2013). Film Noir FAQ: All That's Left to Know About Hollywood's Golden Age of Dames, Detectives, and Danger. Milwaukee, WI: Hal Leonard. ISBN 978-1-55783-855-1.
- Mayer, Geoff; McDonnell, Brian (2007). Encyclopedia of Film Noir. Westport, CT: Greenwood Press. ISBN 978-0-313-33306-4.
- Naremore, James (2008). More Than Night: Film Noir in Its Contexts (2d ed.). Berkeley, Los Angeles, and London: University of California Press. ISBN 978-0-520-25402-2.
- Schwartz, Robert (2005). Neo-Noir: The New Film Noir Style from Psycho to Collateral. Lanham, Maryland: Scarecrow Press. ISBN 978-0-810-85676-9.
- Selby, Spencer (1984). Dark City: The Film Noir. Jefferson, N.C. & London: McFarland Publishing. ISBN 0-89950-103-6.
- Silver, Alain; Ward, Elizabeth; eds. (1992). Film Noir: An Encyclopedic Reference to the American Style (3rd ed.). Woodstock, New York: The Overlook Press. ISBN 0-87951-479-5.
- Silver, Alain; Ward, Elizabeth; Ursini, James; Porfirio, Robert; eds. (2010). Film Noir: The Encyclopedia. New York & London: Overlook/Duckworth. ISBN 978-1-59020-144-2.
- Spicer, Andrew (2002). Film Noir. Harlow, UK: Longman/Pearson Education. ISBN 978-0-582-43712-8.
- Spicer, Andrew (2010). Historical Dictionary of Film Noir. Lanham, MD: Scarecrow Press. ISBN 978-0-8108-5960-9.
- Spicer, Andrew; Hanson, Helen (2013). A Companion to Film Noir. Oxford: Wiley-Blackwell. ISBN 978-1-4443-3627-6.
- Williams, Tony (2017). Hong Kong Neo-Noir. Yau, Esther (ed.). Edinburgh University Press. ISBN 9781474412674.
