= Ikarie XB-1 =

1963 Czechoslovak science fiction film by Jindřich Polák

- Czechoslovak theatrical release poster
- Directed by: Jindřich Polák
- Screenplay by: Pavel Juráček; Jindřich Polák
- Based on: The Magellanic Cloud by Stanislaw Lem
- Starring: Zdeněk Štěpánek; Radovan Lukavský; František Smolík; Dana Medřická
- Cinematography: Jan Kališ
- Edited by: Josef Dobřichovský
- Music by: Zdeněk Liška
- Production company: Filmové Studio Barrandov
- Distributed by: Ústřední půjčovna filmů American International Pictures (USA)
- Release dates: July 26, 1963 (Czechoslovakia); September 1964 (U.S.)
- Running time: 86 minutes
- Country: Czechoslovakia
- Language: Czech
- Budget: 6 Million KČs

Ikarie XB-1 is a 1963 Czechoslovak science fiction film directed by Jindřich Polák. It is loosely based on the novel The Magellanic Cloud, by Stanisław Lem. The film was released in the United States, edited and dubbed into English, under the title Voyage to the End of the Universe.

== Synopsis ==
In the year 2163, the starship Ikarie XB-1 is sent to the mysterious "White Planet" orbiting the star Alpha Centauri. Travelling at near-light speed, the journey takes around 28 months for the astronauts, although the effects of relativity mean that 15 years will have elapsed on Earth by the time they reach their destination. During the flight, the 40-strong multinational crew must adjust to life in space, as well as dealing with various hazards they encounter, including a derelict 20th century spaceship armed with nuclear weapons and a deadly radioactive "dark star" whose radiation causes the mental illness in the crew and all of them gradually fall asleep. After some time they suddenly wake up and one person, most affected by the "dark star", suffers a mental breakdown and threatens to destroy the spacecraft demanding the immediate return. Eventually the ship approaches the "White Planet", and the crew sees an industrial world in the viewscreens.

== Cast ==
- Zdeněk Štěpánek as commander Vladimir Abayev
- Radovan Lukavský as 2nd in command MacDonald
- Dana Medřická as sociologist Nina Kirová
- František Smolík as mathematician Anthony Hopkins
- Jiří Vršťala as pilot Erik Svenson
- Otto Lackovič as coordinator Michal

== Production ==
While it shows some influence from earlier American ventures such as Forbidden Planet (1956), the film was also influential in its own right — critics have noted a number of similarities between Ikarie XB-1 and Stanley Kubrick's film 2001: A Space Odyssey (1968) and it is believed to have been one of the many 'space' genre films that Kubrick screened while researching 2001.

The 1963 children's film Clown Ferdinand and the Rocket, from the TV series about the clown directed by Jindřich Polák, was produced using the props of Ikarie XB-1.

== The English-language version ==
The heavily edited and English-dubbed version was given a limited theatrical release in the USA in 1964 by American International Pictures. The AIP version also occasionally screened on television in the USA and other countries at various times over the ensuing years but, apart from its screening at the 1963 Trieste Science Fiction Film Festival, the original Czech version was rarely seen outside Czechoslovakia until its release on DVD in 2005 by Facets Video.

AIP made numerous alterations for the English-language version of the film, which it retitled Voyage to the End of the Universe. Almost ten minutes of footage was cut, the names of the cast and staff in the opening credits were anglicized, and the ship's destination was renamed "The Green Planet".

However, the biggest change was AIP's recut of the closing scene, which created an entirely different ending from the original. In the Czech version, as the Ikarie approaches its destination its viewscreen shows the clouds around the White Planet parting to reveal a densely populated and industrialized planet surface. For the English version, AIP excised the last few seconds and substituted stock aerial footage of view of southern Manhattan and the Statue of Liberty. According to one reviewer, Glenn Erickson, AIP's edits and script changes were intended to create a gimmicky "surprise" ending, revealing that the Ikarie and its crew have come from an alien world and that the "Green Planet" is in fact Earth.

== Reception ==
Ikarie XB-1 was a hit at the 1963 Trieste Science Fiction Film Festival where it won the main prize.

In a BFI Southbank retrospective on Soviet science fiction film, British director Alex Cox praised Ikarie XB-1 calling it "beautiful and austere" and "remains one of the most original and exciting science fiction films ever made." Cine Outsider called it "a gripping, entertaining and character-driven drama".

Author Trace Reddell wrote in his book "the film is in fact a prescient instance of the maturing of the genre. (...) Ikarie XB1 is intended to be sophisticated fare for adult viewers, a serious platform for a complex and critical set of intertwined stories about the various crew members aboard Ikarie XB1."

It is claimed that Ikarie XB-1 was among the inspirations for Stanley Kubrick during his work on 2001: A Space Odyssey.

== New releases ==
In 2005, Filmexport Home Video released a DVD of the original Czech version of the film with English subtitles and presented in its original aspect ratio (CinemaScope 2.35:1 anamorphic widescreen). The DVD includes opening credits from the US version and two scenes as a bonus material to show the differences.

A new 4k digitally restored version by Czech Film Archive was selected for screening as part of the Cannes Classics section at the 2016 Cannes Film Festival. In 2017, a digitally restored edition was released by the Czech Film Archive in Prague on DVD and Blu-ray, with Czech, English and French subtitles.
