= List of action films =

This is chronological list of action films split by decade. Often there may be considerable overlap particularly between action and other genres (including horror, comedy and science fiction films); the lists should attempt to document films which are more closely related to action, even if they blend genres.

== Films by decade ==
- List of action films of the 1960s
- List of action films of the 1970s
- List of action films of the 1980s
- List of action films of the 1990s
- List of action films of the 2000s
- List of action films of the 2010s
- List of action films of the 2020s

== See also ==
- Action film
- Action comedy film, which includes a list of films
- Martial arts film
- Pirate film
- Swashbuckler film
- Superhero film
- List of highest-grossing action films
