= Jan Kališ =

Czech cinematographer (1930–2003)

- Born: 7 July 1930; Brno, Czechoslovakia
- Died: 23 July 2003 (aged 73); Prague, Czech Republic
- Occupation: Cinematographer
- Years active: 1952–1989

Jan Kališ (7 July 1930 – 23 July 2003) was a Czech cinematographer and pedagogue. He studied cinematography at FAMU. He worked at Studio of children films (1954–1955) and then at Barrandov Studios (1955–1990). He was teaching cinematography at FAMU from 1965 to 2003. He often worked with directors Zbyněk Brynych and Jindřich Polák. Since 1960s he also worked on productions for West German televisions.

== Selected filmography ==
- Občan Brych (1953)
- Dobrodruzství na Zlaté zátoce (1955)
- Ikarie XB-1 (1963)
- The Fifth Horseman Is Fear (1964)
- Case for a Rookie Hangman (1969)
- Tomorrow I'll Wake Up and Scald Myself with Tea (1977)
