= List of action films of the 1960s =

This is chronological list of action films released before the 1970s. Often there may be considerable overlap particularly between action and other genres (including horror, comedy and science fiction films); the list should attempt to document films which are more closely related to action, even if they blend genres.

Action films are generally considered a post-Classical Hollywood film genre. Additions to this category before the 1970s should be used sparingly, and films before the 1960s are not to be included.

Title	Director	Cast	Country	Subgenre/notes
1961
Yojimbo	Akira Kurosawa	Toshiro Mifune, Tatsuya Nakadai, Yoko Tsukasa	Japan	
1962
Dr. No	Terence Young	Sean Connery	United Kingdom; United States	
Shinobi no Mono	Satsuo Yamamoto	Raizo Ichikawa	Japan	Martial arts film
1963
From Russia with Love	Terence Young	Sean Connery, Daniela Bianchi, Robert Shaw, Pedro Armendáriz	United Kingdom; United States	
1964
Goldfinger	Guy Hamilton	Sean Connery, Gert Fröbe, Honor Blackman, Harold Sakata	United Kingdom; United States	
Greed in the Sun	Henri Verneuil	Jean-Paul Belmondo, Lino Ventura, Bernard Blier, Gert Fröbe	France; Italy	Action comedy
That Man from Rio	Philippe de Broca	Jean-Paul Belmondo, Françoise Dorléac, Jean Servais, Adolfo Celi	France; Italy	Action comedy
1965
The 10th Victim	Elio Petri	Marcello Mastroianni, Ursula Andress, Elsa Martinelli	Italy; France	Science fiction action
Agent 3S3: Passport to Hell	Sergio Sollima	George Ardisson, Georges Rivière	France; Italy	
Faster, Pussycat! Kill! Kill!	Russ Meyer	Tura Satana, Haji, Lori Williams	United States	Action comedy
Masquerade	Basil Dearden	Cliff Robertson, Jack Hawkins, Marisa Mell	United Kingdom	Action comedy
Red Line 7000	Howard Hawks	James Caan, Laura Devon, Charlene Holt, Marianna Hill	United States	
Thunderball	Terence Young	Sean Connery, Claudine Auger, Adolfo Celi, Luciana Paluzzi	United Kingdom; United States	Action thriller
1966
Come Drink with Me	King Hu	Chen Hung-Lieh, Cheng Pei-pei, Chung Shen Lao	Hong Kong	Martial arts film
Lightning Bolt	Antonio Margheriti	Anthony Eisley, Diana Lorys, Ursula Parker	Italy; Spain	
Murderers' Row	Henry Levin	Dean Martin, Ann-Margret, Karl Malden	United States	
Ōgon Bat	Hajime Sato	Sonny Chiba, Wataru Yamakawa, Hisako Tsukaba	Japan	Superhero film
Our Man Flint	Daniel Mann	James Coburn, Lee J. Cobb, Gila Golan	United States	
Password: Kill Agent Gordon	Terence Hathaway	Roger Browne, Helga Liné, Franco Ressel	United States; Spain; Italy	
Sabotage	Eddie Garcia	Tony Ferrer, Josephine Manuel, Mary Louise Matheson	Philippines	
The Silencers	Phil Karlson	Dean Martin, Stella Stevens, Daliah Lavi	United States	
The Wild Angels	Roger Corman	Peter Fonda, Nancy Sinatra, Bruce Dern	United States	Action thriller
1967
The Ambushers	Henry Levin	Dean Martin, Senta Berger, Janice Rule	United States	
The Born Losers	Tom Laughlin	Tom Laughlin, Elizabeth James, Jane Russell	United States	Action thriller
The Elusive Avengers	Edmond Keosayan	Viktor Kosykh, Mikhail Metyolkin, Vasili Vasilyev	Soviet Union	
A Game without Rules	Jindřich Polák	Svatopluk Matyáš	Czechoslovakia	
Hells Angels on Wheels	Richard Rush	Jack Nicholson, Adam Roarke, Sabrina Scharf	United States	Action thriller
In Like Flint	Gordon Douglas	James Coburn, Lee J. Cobb, Jean Hale	United States	Action comedy
One Armed Swordsman	Chang Cheh	Jimmy Wang Yu, Pan Yin Tze, Chiao Chiao	Hong Kong	Martial arts films
You Only Live Twice	Lewis Gilbert	Sean Connery, Akiko Wakabayashi, Tetsurō Tamba, Mie Hama	United Kingdom; United States	
1968
Bullitt	Peter Yates	Steve McQueen, Robert Vaughn, Jacqueline Bisset	United States	Action thriller
Coogan's Bluff	Don Siegel	Clint Eastwood, Lee J. Cobb, Susan Clark, Tisha Sterling, Don Stroud, Betty Field, Tom Tully, Melodie Johnson, James Edwards, Rudy Diaz, David F. Doyle, Meg Myles, Marjorie Bennett, Seymour Cassel, Albert Popwell, Skip Battin	United States	Action thriller
Danger: Diabolik	Mario Bava	John Phillip Law, Marisa Mell, Michel Piccoli, Adolfo Celi	Italy; France	
Ice Station Zebra	John Sturges	Rock Hudson, Ernest Borgnine, Patrick McGoohan	United States	Action thriller
The Mini-Skirt Mob	Maury Dexter	Jeremy Slate, Diane McBain, Sherry Jackson	United States	Action thriller
OSS 117 – Double Agent	André Hunebelle	John Gavin, Curd Jürgens, Margaret Lee	France	Action thriller
The Wrecking Crew	Phil Karlson	Dean Martin, Elke Sommer, Sharon Tate	United States	
1969
Hell's Angels '69	Lee Madden, Conny Van Dyke	Tom Stern, Jeremy Slate, Conny Van Dyke	United States	Action thriller
On Her Majesty's Secret Service	Peter Hunt	George Lazenby, Diana Rigg, Telly Savalas	United Kingdom; United States	
Shark!	Samuel Fuller	Burt Reynolds, Arthur Kennedy	Mexico; United States	Action thriller

== See also ==
- Action films
- Martial arts films
- Swashbuckler films
- Western films
