= Od zítřka nečaruji =

1978 Czechoslovak film by Jindřich Polák

Od zítřka nečaruji is a 1978 Czechoslovak film directed by Jindřich Polák. The film starred Josef Kemr.
