= Fritz Diez =

German actor, producer, director and theater manager

- Fritz Diez
- Born: Friedrich Diez; 27 February 1901; Meiningen, Duchy of Saxe-Meiningen, German Empire
- Died: 19 October 1979 (aged 78); Weimar, East Germany
- Occupations: Actor, producer, director
- Years active: 1920–1979
- Spouse: Martha Beschort

Fritz Diez (27 February 1901 – 19 October 1979) was a German actor, producer, director and theater manager.

== Biography ==
=== Early life ===
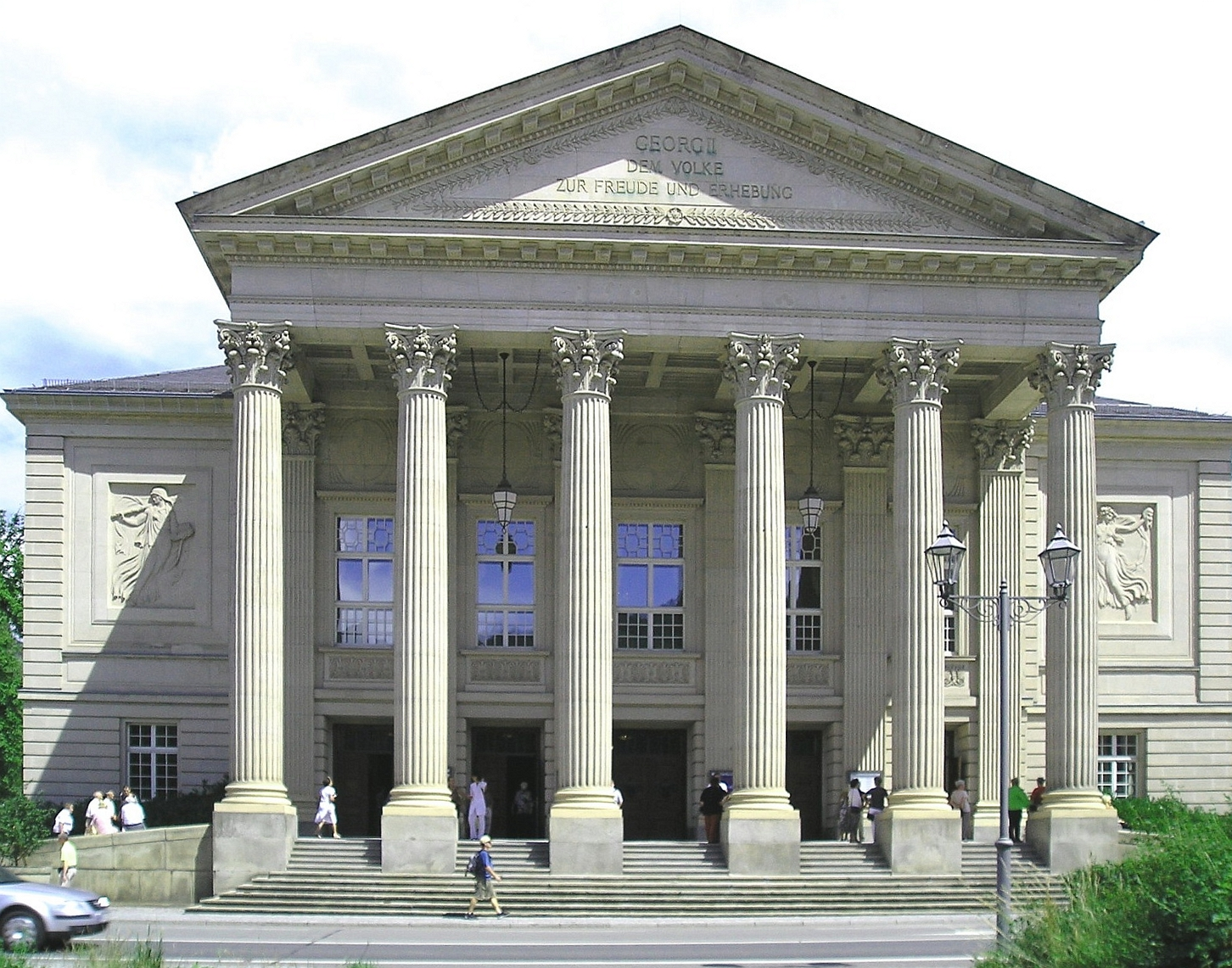
The Meiningen Theater.

Diez's mother was a servant, and raised her three children alone. To support his family, the child began working at the age of nine. While in the 7th grade, he appeared in his class' production of William Tell. In 1920, after joining the Meiningen Ducal Theater in the role of a supernumerary actor, Diez left his work as an electrician's apprentice and began taking acting classes in the Meiningen School of Dramatic Arts. He devoted himself to professional acting ever since, appearing on the stages of theaters in Flensburg, Hanau, Baden-Baden, Würzburg and Cheb. While performing in the Eisenach Theater, he met his future wife, actress Martha Beschort. The two married in 1923.

During 1932, while he and Martha were working in the Stadttheater Bremerhaven, they both joined the KPD. Diez, who originally was a member of the Guild of the German Stage, joined the Profintern-oriented Revolutionary Trade Union Opposition and was elected chairman of the theater's branch.

=== Exile ===
On the morning of 28 February 1933, a day after the Reichstag fire, Diez's home was raided by the Gestapo. On 6 March, immediately after the elections, the actor was dismissed from his work for being a communist. During 1935, Diez – fearing an interrogation by the Gestapo - had to emigrate from Germany. He and his wife traveled to Switzerland, where he worked in the St. Gallen Theater. Diez became involved in the communist and anti-fascist circles of German exiles that were formed in the country. The St. Gallen Theater's manager, Theo Modes, was a supporter of the Third Reich, and Diez was "completely isolated" in his place of work. In 1943 he joined the Swiss branch of the recently founded National Committee for a Free Germany. By the end of the war, Diez headed the St. Gallen fraction of the Democratic Union of Germans in Switzerland, an offshoot of the Committee. He also edited this movement's newspaper.

=== German Democratic Republic ===
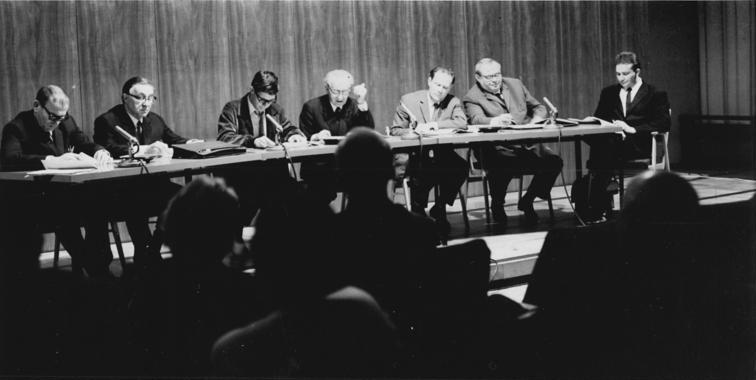
Fritz Diez (second from the left) in 1966.

Diez returned to the Soviet-administered Meiningen in 1946. He worked in the municipal theater, first as an actor and later as a director and an artistic director. In 1947, he was appointed its manager. During 1952, he made his debut on screen in the DEFA film Shadow Over The Islands. He appeared in some twenty films until the end of his career, as well as in several television productions.

In 1954, Diez left Meiningen, remaining an honorable member of the theater, and instead took the position of the Halle National Theater's manager. In 1958, he joined the Dresden Theater as an actor and a director. During the 1960s, he performed and directed plays in the Volksbühne and in the Deutsches Theater. Diez was also a member of the German Shakespeare Society.

The figure of Hitler, which he first portrayed in the Meiningen Theater during 1947, was described by Diez as an "ungrateful role which always seemed to pursue me." He played the character on screen and in television in ten different productions – among them Ernst Thälmann - Führer seiner Klasse (1955), I, Justice, Frozen Flashes (both 1967), Liberation (1970–1971), Seventeen Moments of Spring (1973), Take Aim (1974) and Soldiers of Freedom (1977). Dilara Ozerova - the wife of Yuri Ozerov, who directed Liberation - claimed that Diez was reluctant to accept the invitation to depict Hitler in her husband's film series, fearing typecasting, but had to accept it as a "Party mission". Author Charles P. Mitchell wrote that the actor was "Eastern Europe's equivalent to Bobby Watson in terms of the frequency of his Hitler appearances."

In 1971, Diez received the Patriotic Order of Merit in silver. On 9 October 1979, shortly before his death, he was awarded the title of an Honorary Citizen of Meiningen.

== Filmography ==
Film
Year	Title	Role	Notes
1952	Shadow Over The Islands	Arne Horn	
1953	Swings Or Roundabouts	Hellwand	
1955	Ernst Thälmann	Adolf Hitler	
1956	Thomas Müntzer	Field Captain Hoffmann	
1957	Betrogen bis zum jüngsten Tag	Adolf Hitler	Voice
1959	Special Mission	Captain Lieutenant Wegner	
1959	Goods for Catalonia	Captain Gerner	
1959	SAS 181 Does Not Reply	The intendant	
1959	The Goodies	Weber	
1959	The Punch Bowl	State Secretary Frisch	
1960	Always on Duty	Father Kraft	
1960	Doctor Ahrendt's Decision	Scholz	
1960	Five Cartridges	Major Bolaños	
1963	Carbide and Sorrel	Worker	
1966	The Escape In The Silent	Stetter	
1967	Frozen Flashes	Adolf Hitler	
1967	I, Justice	Adolf Hitler	
1970	Liberation I: The Fire Bulge	Adolf Hitler	
1970	Liberation II: Breakthrough	Adolf Hitler	
1971	Liberation III: Direction of the Main Blow	Adolf Hitler	
1971	Liberation IV: The Battle of Berlin	Adolf Hitler	
1971	Liberation V: The Last Assault	Adolf Hitler	
1972	Hurray! We Are Going on a Vacation!	Grandfather	
1976	Take Aim	Adolf Hitler, Otto Hahn	
1980	Glück im Hinterhaus	Vater Erp	
1995	The Great Commander Georgy Zhukov	Adolf Hitler	Compilation of footage from older pictures

Television
Year	Title	Role	Notes
1963	A Man and his Shadow	Uncredited role	
1963	Carl von Ossietzky	Hellmut von Gerlach	
1963	Blue Light	Major Löbel	Episode 18: Hot Money
1965	Moments of Joy	Otto Meinicke	
1966	Secret Unit Boomerang	Uncredited role	
1966	No Victory Without Struggle	Hermann Abs	
1967	Blue Light	Dr. Döppke	Episode 28:Night Patrol
1969	Three From the K	The committee chief	Episode 13: A Strange Case
1970	Tscheljuskin	Valerian Kuybyshev	
1973	Seventeen Moments of Spring	Adolf Hitler	Episodes no. 1, 3 and 5
1973	The Wondrous Treasure	Judge	
1974	New From Florentiner No. 73	Krawuttcke	
1977	Soldiers of Freedom	Adolf Hitler	Four episodes
1978	Dangerous Inquiry	Uncredited role	Season 1, Episode 2: Death in the Alpsee
1980	Joy in the Rear Exit	Karl's father	Filmed before Diez's death
1993	The Tragedy of the 20th Century	Adolf Hitler	Compilation of footage from older pictures

Voice actor
Year	Title	Role	Notes
1957	Duped Till Doomsday	Adolf Hitler	
1961	The Story of the Christmas Man	Narrator	
1961	Two Goats	Narrator	
1961	Aunt Minna, her Dog and Science	Narrator	
