= Marita Böhme =

German actress (born 1939)

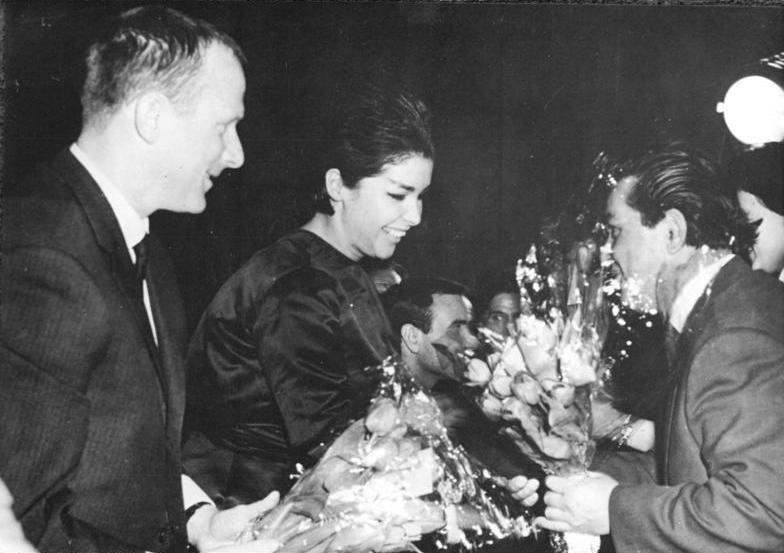
- Marita Bohme (middle) with Wolfgang Kohlhaase (left) in Bulgaria in 1963
- Born: 7 May 1939 (age 87); Dresden, Germany
- Occupation: Actress
- Years active: 1962–2005

Marita Böhme (born 7 May 1939) is a German actress. She appeared in more than forty films from 1962 to 2005.

== Selected filmography ==
| Year | Title | Role | Notes |
|---|---|---|---|
| 1962 | On the Sunny Side | Ottilie Zinn | |
| 1963 | Carbide and Sorrel | Karla | |
| 1966 | The Escape in the Silent | Helga Klink | |
