= I, Justice =

- A promotional poster of the film.
- Directed by: Zbyněk Brynych.
- Written by: Miroslav Hanuš
- Screenplay by: Milos Macourek
- Produced by: Eliská Nejedla
- Starring: Karel Höger, Fritz Diez
- Cinematography: Josef Vanis
- Edited by: Miroslav Hájek
- Music by: Jirí Sternwald
- Production companies: Barrandov Studios; DEFA-Babelsberg
- Release date: 12 April 1968
- Running time: 88 minutes
- Countries: Czechoslovakia; East Germany
- Languages: Czech, German.

I, Justice (Czech: Já, spravedlnost; German: Als Hitler den Krieg überlebte [When Hitler Survived the War]) is a 1968 Czechoslovak psychological thriller, directed by Zbyněk Brynych.

== Plot ==
In 1946, during the Nuremberg Trials, a Czechoslovak physician, Doctor Heřman, is abducted by a mysterious organization. To his horror, Heřman discovers that he is to treat Adolf Hitler, whose suicide in 1945 was faked. Hitler now lives in an isolated sanatorium in Germany, surrounded by his ostensibly loyal followers, a group of former high-ranking Nazis. But those men blame him for Germany's defeat and destruction, and have decided that a single death is not satisfactory punishment for Hitler. Rather, he is made to believe that the Second World War is still being fought. The German officers stage 'Allied raids' in which Hitler is captured, faces trial and a death sentence, put under the guillotine's blade and then is rescued by his supporters at the last moment - only to face it all again, over and over. The experience drives Hitler into an unbearable mental agony; The doctor decides to put an end to his misery and kills him.

== Production ==
The film's script was based on the eponymous novel by Miroslav Hanuš, published at 1946. Hanuš' book was criticized for what critics perceived to be a superficial treatment of the moral questions raised by the crimes of Nazism.

The film adaptation was director Brynych's third work concerned with the atrocities committed during World War II, after the 1962 Transport From Paradise - which dealt with the life in the Theresienstadt concentration camp, and was adapted from Arnošt Lustig's autobiographical novel, Night and Hope - and the 1964 The Fifth Horseman is Fear, about a Jewish doctor in German-occupied Prague.

== Reception ==
The film was received poorly, and failed to secure any nominations or awards. Czechoslovak film critic Jan Žalman wrote that "Doctor Heřman found a solution for himself, but not for the viewer, at least not the one who expected to see evil defeated on the moral level, and not just on the physical one." The New York Times' reviewer called the movie a "gripping moral and political exposé of frightening fantasy".

== Select cast ==
- Karel Höger as Doctor Heřman.
- Fritz Diez as Adolf Hitler.
- Angelica Domröse as Inga.
- Jirí Vršťala as Harting.
- Karel Charvát as Herbert.
- Jindřich Narenta as Man With Glasses
