= On the Sunny Side (1961 film) =

1962 film

Auf der Sonnenseite
- Directed by: Ralf Kirsten
- Written by: Heinz Kahlau; Gisela Steineckert; Ralf Kirsten
- Produced by: Alexander Lösche
- Starring: Manfred Krug
- Narrated by: Manfred Krug; Marita Böhme
- Cinematography: Hans Heinrich
- Edited by: Christel Röhl
- Music by: Andre Asriel; Manfred Krug and the Jazz Optimists from Berlin
- Production company: DEFA
- Distributed by: Progress Film
- Release date: 5 January 1962
- Running time: 101 minutes
- Country: East Germany
- Language: German

On the Sunny Side (German: Auf der Sonnenseite) is an East German musical comedy film, directed by Ralf Kirsten and starring Manfred Krug. It was released in 1962.

== Plot ==
Martin Hoff, a steel smelter and an amateur actor and jazz singer, is sent to a drama school by his factory's committee. Due to his troublesome conduct, he is expelled. Hoff meets a young woman called Ottilie who is unimpressed by him; he bets his friends that he will manage to charm her. Hoff begins to work on the construction site where she serves as a group manager, although she has trouble enforcing her will on her male subordinates. He only has success with her after director Jens Krüger guides him to become a diligent laborer. In addition to his work, he continues to perform in amateur plays. When theater manager Pabst sees him acting, he invites him to join his cast. Hoff and Ottilie decide to marry.

== Cast ==
- Manfred Krug: Martin Hoff
- Marita Böhme: Ottilie Zinn
- Heinz Schubert: Felix Schnepf
- Rolf Herricht: Hoff's friend
- Peter Sturm: Pabst
- Fred Mahr: Jens Krüger
- Gert Andreae: Matze Wind
- Günter Naumann: driver
- Werner Lierck: director
- Willi Neuenhahn: viewer
- Rolf Römer: Hoff's friend
- Heinz Lyschik: Hoff's friend

== Production ==
During the end of the 1950s, the DEFA Studio's management noted the public's demand for entertainment and responded by producing a series of light comedies, relatively free from ideological messages. According to Heiko R. Blum, On the Sunny Side "distinguished itself by its unmitigated portrayal of real life."

The film's script was largely inspired by leading star Manfred Krug's biography: he worked in a steel factory before turning to an acting career. Krug's jazz band and his singing career were also a central theme in the plot.

== Reception ==
According to DEFA historian Dagmar Schittly, On the Sunny Side was the most popular East German film of the early 1960s, and was very successful with the audience. Director Ralf Kirsten, Krug, writers Heinz Kahlau and Gisela Steineckert and cinematographer Hans Heinrich were awarded the Heinrich Greif Prize 1st class for their collective work on the picture at March 1962. Steineckert also received the Art Prize of the Free German Trade Union Federation.

Krug's biographer Ralf Schenk wrote that On the Sunny Side "proved wrong the known saying that if DEFA would produce a comedy, the audiences would remain at home and cry." Sabine Hake noted that, while the studio consistently opposed the concept of a star system, the film turned Krug into East Germany's only "genuine screen idol". On the Sunny Side was the actor's breakthrough picture, and he became famous after its release. Ina-Lyn Reif wrote that the state's artistic establishment perceived Krug as "capturing the younger generation's mood" after the release of On the Sunny Side.

Sabine Brummel commented that the film "virtually lacked a political statement", an uncommon feature in DEFA's productions up to that time, and even presented a realistic depiction of the workplace: the construction team did not accept Ottilie as their manager because she was a woman, and the Workers' Brigade leader was incompetent. Still, On the Sunny Side "made concessions to the censors" by featuring the devout communist Jens Krüger as a positive father figure, and "ideology did have its place". Rebecca Menzel pointed out that the film was the first East German picture to portray jeans in a neutral manner; Krug and other workers wore them. At the time, they were considered a bourgeois form of clothing and were banned in schools.
