= The Escape in the Silent =

1966 film

- Flucht ins Schweigen
- Directed by: Siegfried Hartmann
- Written by: Edmund Kiehl
- Produced by: Alexander Lösche, Horst Klein
- Starring: Fritz Diez, Dieter Wien
- Cinematography: Rolf Sohre
- Edited by: Helga Emmrich
- Music by: Karl Schinsky
- Production company: DEFA
- Distributed by: Progress Film
- Release date: 27 May 1966
- Running time: 83 minutes
- Country: East Germany
- Language: German

The Escape in the Silent (German: Flucht ins Schweigen) is an East German black-and-white film, directed by Siegfried Hartmann. It was released in 1966.

== Plot ==
Construction works carried out in a small village in Thuringia reveal the corpses of two members of the Waffen-SS, who seem to have been buried during the end of the Second World War - although no fighting took place in the area. Two forensics experts from the People's Police Investigations Department, Stetter and Hoffmann, arrive in the village to determine the cause of death. At first, they suspect the then owner of the property where the bodies were discovered; but after questioning him, he is murdered. A golden coin they found leads them to a local woman named Helga, and they reveal the truth behind the matter.

== Cast ==
- Fritz Diez as Stetter
- Dieter Wien as Hoffmann
- Marita Böhme as Helga Klink
- Regine Albrecht as Inge Klink
- Jiří Vršťala as Wills
- Hans-Joachim Hanisch as Zschunke
- Hans Hardt-Hardtloff as Schindler
- Karlheinz Liefers as priest
- Wolfgang Brunecker as Möller
- Rolf Ludwig as Karl Reinhold
- Horst Schön as SS man
- Ernst-Georg Schwill as police clerk
- Siegfried Weiß as jeweler
- Günter Sonnenberg as Heinz Klink
- Willi Neuenhahn as the wheelwright

== Production ==
The script was based on Wolfgang Held's novel, The Death Pays with Ducats, published at 1964.

== Reception ==
At 1966, Albert Wilkening wrote that "this thriller continues the honored tradition of DEFA, by combining the genre with contemporary issues, as well as an important historical and political background." The Eulenspiegel magazine's reviewer commented that "Finally... One must see the film, for the sake of the elusive culmination of its plot." The German Film Lexicon regarded it as "a criminal drama, the powerful statement of which is weakened by formalistic deficiencies."
