= List of highest-grossing action films =

The following is a list of highest-grossing action films of all time. The list does not include science fiction, superhero or fantasy films, which are listed separately at the list of highest-grossing science fiction films, list of highest-grossing superhero films and list of highest-grossing fantasy films.

== Highest-grossing action films ==
The following is a list of 50 highest grossing action films of time. The top 4, which are the only ones to gross $1 billion worldwide, are among the 50 highest-grossing films of all time. Mission: Impossible and Fast & Furious are the most frequent franchises, with seven films each on the list. All of the films have had a theatrical run, including re-releases since 1989, and films that have not played during this period do not appear on the chart because of ticket-price inflation, population size and ticket purchasing trends not being considered. 2015 is the most frequent year with five films on the list.

Rank	Film	Year	Gross	Ref
1	Furious 7	2015	$1,515,342,457	
2	Top Gun: Maverick	2022	$1,503,260,455	
3	The Fate of the Furious	2017	$1,238,764,765	
4	Skyfall	2012	$1,108,594,137	
5	The Battle at Lake Changjin	2021	$913,000,000	
6	Spectre	2015	$880,707,597	
7	Wolf Warrior 2	2017	$870,325,439	
8	Mission: Impossible – Fallout	2018	$791,657,398	
9	Fast & Furious 6	2013	$788,683,342	
10	Indiana Jones and the Kingdom of the Crystal Skull	2008	$786,636,033	
11	No Time to Die	2021	$774,153,007	
12	Hobbs & Shaw	2019	$760,732,926	
13	F9	2021	$726,229,501	
14	Fast X	2023	$704,875,015	
15	Mission: Impossible – Ghost Protocol	2011	$694,713,380	
16	Mission: Impossible – Rogue Nation	2015	$682,716,636	
17	F1	2025	$634,042,436	
18	The Battle at Lake Changjin II	2022	$626,571,697	
19	Fast Five	2011	$626,140,012	
20	Casino Royale	2006	$616,577,552	
21	Mission: Impossible – The Final Reckoning	2025	$598,767,057	
22	Quantum of Solace	2008	$589,580,482	
23	Operation Red Sea	2018	$579,330,426	
24	Mission: Impossible – Dead Reckoning Part One	2023	$571,125,435	
25	American Sniper	2014	$547,659,020	
26	Mission: Impossible 2	2000	$546,388,108	
27	Sherlock Holmes: A Game of Shadows	2011	$543,848,418	
28	Sherlock Holmes	2009	$524,028,679	
29	Troy	2004	$497,409,852	
30	Twister	1996	$494,580,615	
31	Jaws	1975	$490,736,300	
32	Mr. & Mrs. Smith	2005	$487,287,646	
33	Saving Private Ryan	1998	$482,352,390	
34	San Andreas	2015	$474,609,154	
35	Indiana Jones and the Last Crusade	1989	$474,171,806	
36	Gladiator	2000	$465,516,248	
37	Gladiator II	2024	$462,180,717	
38	The Eight Hundred	2020	$461,421,559	
39	Mission: Impossible	1996	$457,696,391	
40	The Last Samurai	2003	$456,810,575	
41	300	2007	$456,068,181	
42	Pearl Harbor	2001	$449,220,945	
43	The Bourne Ultimatum	2007	$444,100,035	
44	John Wick: Chapter 4	2023	$440,146,694	
45	Die Another Day	2002	$431,971,116	
46	Bad Boys for Life	2020	$426,505,244	
47	The Captain	2019	$417,863,545	
48	Jason Bourne	2016	$415,484,914	
49	Kingsman: The Secret Service	2015	$414,351,546	
50	Too Cool to Kill	2022	$413,000,000	

== Box office ticket sales ==
The following is a list of action films by box office admissions, listing films that sold more than 90 million tickets worldwide. Films with more than 100 million ticket sales are listed among the most box office admissions of all time.

Film	Year	Tickets (est.)	Territories included (Note: Box office territories for which the film's ticket sales data are currently known)	Ref
Wudang (The Undaunted Wudang)	1983	610,000,000	China	
Gunshots in the CIB (Baomi Ju de Qiangsheng)	1979	600,000,000	China	
Murder in 405 (405 mou sha an)	1980	600,000,000	China	
The Shaolin Brothers	1983	520,000,000	China	
Shaolin Temple	1982	500,994,065	China, Hong Kong, Seoul City	(Note: Shaolin Temple admissions: China – 500,000,000; Hong Kong – 700,000; South Korea (Seoul City) – 294,065)
Deadly Fury (Pride's Deadly Fury)	1984	500,000,000	China	
The Xi'an Incident	1981	450,000,000	China	
Manhunt (Kimi yo Fundo no Kawa o Watare)	1976	434,420,000	Japan, China, Soviet Union	(Note: Kimi yo Fundo no Kawa o Watare (Manhunt) ticket sales and gross revenue: Japan – ¥240 million rentals – 720,000 tickets – ¥620 million ($2 million) gross receipts; China – 400,000,000 tickets – $52 million (Note: See Film industry § Average ticket price.); Soviet Union – 33,700,000 tickets – $16 million)
Mysterious Buddha (Shen mi de da fo)	1980	400,000,000	China	
Kai Qiang, Wei Ta Song Xing	1982	330,000,000	China	
Caravan	1971	319,000,000	India, China	
Tunnel War	1965	300,000,000	China	
A General Wearing the Sword (Pei jian jiang jun)	1983	260,000,000	China	
Little Heroes (Young Heroes)	1983	260,000,000	China	
Sholay (Embers)	1975	250,021,329	India, Soviet Union, Americas, Europe	(Note: Sholay admissions: Up until 1985 – 250 million; Sholay released in following territories up until 1985 – India, Brazil, Portugal, United States, Soviet Union (where it sold 60 million tickets); European re-releases (2005–2015) – 21,329)
Jaws	1975	243,277,230	Worldwide	
The Fate of the Furious	2017	241,900,000	Worldwide	
Holy Robe of the Shaolin Temple	1985	200,000,000	China	
Furious 7	2015	199,183,691	Worldwide	(Note: Furious 7: Argentina, Australia, Brazil, Chile, China, Colombia, Mexico – 100,297,901; United States and Canada – 41,889,147; Austria, Belgium, Bosnia and Herzegovina, Bulgaria, Croatia, Czech Republic, Denmark, Estonia, Finland, France, Germany, Greece, Hungary, Iceland, Ireland, Latvia, Luxembourg, Montenegro, Morocco, Netherlands, North Macedonia, Norway, Poland, Portugal, Russia, Slovakia, Slovenia, Spain, Sweden, Turkey, United Kingdom – 33,601,457; India – 12,000,000; Bolivia, Lithuania, Paraguay, Peru, Switzerland, Ukraine, Uruguay – 3,872,927; South Korea – 3,248,904; Italy – 2,697,123; United Arab Emirates – 925,000; Romania – 651,232)
Ben-Hur	1959	168,893,565	Worldwide	(Note: Ben-Hur admissions: United States and Canada – 104,996,416; Germany, Italy, Netherlands, United Kingdom – 44,509,000; France – 13,857,261; Spain – 4,653,194; South Korea – 873,163; European re-releases (1996–2021) – 4,531)
Top Gun: Maverick	2022	165,600,000	Worldwide	
Juvenile Delinquents (Innocent Teenagers)	1985	161,000,000	China	
Wolf Warrior 2	2017	160,322,273	China, North America, Europe, Korea	(Note: Wolf Warrior 2: China – 160,000,000; United States and Canada – 304,700; United Kingdom – 12,967; Germany – 3,358; South Korea – 1,248)
Mission: Impossible – Fallout	2018	153,300,000	Worldwide	
Mughal-e-Azam (The Great Mughal)	1960	150,000,000	Worldwide	
Baahubali 2: The Conclusion	2017	150,000,000	Worldwide	
Dangal	2016	140,000,000	Worldwide	
Enter the Dragon	1973	139,000,000	Worldwide	(Note: Enter the Dragon – $400 million+ gross (as of 2001): 1973 – $100 million gross – 56 million tickets; Up until 1980 – $220 million gross; 1974–1980 – $120 million gross – 45 million+ tickets; Up until 1997 – $300 million gross; 1981–1997 – $80 million gross – 17 million+ tickets; 1998–2001 – $100 million gross – 21 million+ tickets)
Disco Dancer	1982	135,000,000	India, Soviet Union	(Note: Disco Dancer: Soviet Union – 120,000,000; India – 15,000,000)
Furious 7	2015	137,100,000	Worldwide	
Zorro	1975	133,050,124	Europe, China, Soviet Union	(Note: Zorro: China – 70,000,000; Soviet Union – 55,300,000; Italy – 4,900,000; France – 1,218,320; Spain – 1,013,104; Germany – 582 573; Denmark – 36,127)
Skyfall	2012	130,400,000	Worldwide	
A Policeman with a Special Identity	1982	130,000,000	China	
Yellow River Fighter	1988	130,000,000	China	
The Godfather	1972	128,176,173	United States, Europe, South Korea	(Note: The Godfather admissions: United States and United Kingdom – 89,922,600; Italy, France, Germany, Spain – 37,622,331; South Korea – 631,242)
The Battle at Lake Changjin	2021	125,059,009	China	(Note: The Battle at Lake Changjin admissions: China – 125,000,000; United States – 37,381; Europe – 11,574)
Spartacus	1960	124,783,920	USA, Canada, Europe, Soviet Union	
Thunderball	1965	122,235,389	Europe, United States	(Note: Thunderball admissions: United Kingdom, United States, Germany – 102.4 million; France and Italy – 19,834,842; Denmark and Switzerland (1999–2001) – 547)
Great Shanghai 1937 (Da Shang Hai 1937)	1986	121,000,000	China	
Fast & Furious Presents: Hobbs & Shaw	2019	116,800,000	Worldwide	
Mirage (Hai shi shen lou)	1987	113,000,000	China	
Raiders of the Lost Ark	1981	107,227,185	Americas, Europe, Brazil, Seoul City	(Note: Raiders of the Lost Ark admissions: United States and Canada – 88,543,400; France, Germany, Italy, Spain – 14,060,685; Brazil - 3,728,299; Denmark – 521,650; Seoul City (South Korea) – 348,489; Switzerland, Finland, United Kingdom, Netherlands, Sweden (1998–2016) – 24,662)
The Revenant	2015	106,800,000	Worldwide	
Crocodile Dundee	1986	105,877,673	Australia, United States, Europe, USSR	
The Glacier Fox	1978	103,700,000	Japan, China, United States	(Note: The Glacier Fox admissions: Japan – 2,300,000; China – 100,000,000; United States – 1,400,000)
First Blood	1982	101,187,271	North America, Europe, China, Korea	(Note: First Blood admissions: United States and Canada – 16,058,800; China – 76 million; France, Spain, Italy – 6,428,836; Germany – 2,416,703; South Korea – 282,932)
Goldfinger	1964	100,150,318	Europe, USA, Canada, Korea	(Note: Goldfinger admissions: United Kingdom, United States, Canada, France, Germany, Netherlands – 100,148,099; Denmark, Norway, Romania, Spain, Switzerland (1999–2017) – 1,490; South Korea – 729)
The War at Sea from Hawaii to Malaya	1942	100,000,000	Japan	
Dong fang jian	1982	100,000,000	China	
The Towering Inferno	1974	91,950,376	United States, Europe, Brazil	
Around the World in 80 Days	1956	91,428,972	United States, France, Germany	

== Highest-grossing openings ==
This list charts films the biggest worldwide openings for action films. Since many films do not open on Fridays in many markets, the 'opening' is taken to be the gross between the first day of release and the first Sunday following the movie's release.

Rank	Film	Year	Opening	Ref
1	The Fate of the Furious	2017	$541,937,239	
2	The Battle at Lake Changjin II	2022	$398,000,000	
3	Furious 7	2015	$397,627,459	
4	Fast X	2023	$323,838,710	
5	Indiana Jones and the Kingdom of the Crystal Skull	2008	$272,150,927	
6	The Captain	2019	$251,966,468	
7	Top Gun: Maverick	2022	$248,000,000	
8	The Battle at Lake Changjin	2021	$235,000,000	
9	Too Cool to Kill	2022	$217,000,000	
10	Mission: Impossible – The Final Reckoning	2025	$204,000,000	
11	Hobbs & Shaw	2019	$179,000,000	
12	Skyfall	2012	$173,600,000	
13	Mission: Impossible - Ghost Protocol	2011	$131,500,000	
14	Twisters	2024	$123,200,000	
15	Mission: Impossible III	2006	$117,800,000	
16	Fast Five	2011	$109,600,000	
17	Quantum of Solace	2008	$106,500,000	
18	Robin Hood	2010	$104,000,000	
19	Troy	2004	$101,600,000	
20	Creed III	2023	$100,400,000	

== Timeline of gross records ==
=== Highest-grossing action films ===
The following is a timeline of highest-grossing action films.

Furious 7 has held the record for the longest time holding it for 8 years. The Tarzan and James Bond franchises have held the record the most times, each doing so on two different occasions.

Year	Title	Record-setting gross	Ref
1918	Tarzan of the Apes	$1,000,000	
1932	Tarzan the Ape Man	$2,540,000	
1937	Elephant Boy	$6,200,000	(Note: Elephant Boy: United Kingdom – £54,615 rental earnings – $150,000 gross (Note: See Film industry § Distributor rentals.) ($740,000) – 3,600,000 tickets; United States – $2,000,000 rentals – $5,500,000 gross – 22,000,000 tickets)
1942	Rudyard Kipling's Jungle Book	$11,000,000	(Note: See Rudyard Kipling's Jungle Book § Box office)
1942	Boom Town	$13,100,000	
1942	The War at Sea from Hawaii to Malaya	$18,000,000	
1943	The Outlaw	$20,000,000	
1946	Duel in the Sun	$20,408,163	
1956	Around the World in 80 Days	$42,000,000	
1959	Ben-Hur	$146,900,000	
1972	The Godfather	$285,000,000	
1973	Enter the Dragon	$400,000,000	
1975	Jaws	$490,736,300	
1996	Twister	$494,580,615	
2000	Mission: Impossible 2	$546,388,108	
2006	Casino Royale	$606,000,064	
2008	Indiana Jones and the Kingdom of the Crystal Skull	$786,636,033	
2012	Skyfall	$1,108,594,137	
2015	Furious 7	$1,515,342,457	

=== Highest-grossing openings ===
The following is a timeline for biggest opening weekend for action films. The Indiana Jones franchise has held the record the most of any franchise, doing so three times.

Established	Title	Record-setting opening	Ref
1943	The Outlaw	$31,000	
1943	The War at Sea from Hawaii to Malaya	$260,000	
1960	Mughal-e-Azam (The Great Mughal)	$840,000	
1969	On Her Majesty's Secret Service	$1,200,000	
1971	Diamonds Are Forever	$2,242,557	
1974	The Man with the Golden Gun	$3,441,228	
1975	Jaws	$7,061,513	
1977	The Deep	$8,124,316	
1978	Jaws 2	$9,866,023	
1978	Every Which Way but Loose	$10,272,294	
1979	Moonraker	$14,744,718	
1982	Rocky III	$16,015,408	
1984	Indiana Jones and the Temple of Doom	$25,337,110	
1987	Beverly Hills Cop II	$26,348,555	
1989	Indiana Jones and the Last Crusade	$29,355,021	
1992	Lethal Weapon 3	$33,243,086	
1996	Twister	$41,059,405	
1996	Mission: Impossible	$45,436,830	
2000	Mission: Impossible 2	$57,845,297	
2001	Rush Hour 2	$70,670,104	
2004	Troy	$101,600,000	
2006	Mission: Impossible III	$117,800,000	
2008	Indiana Jones and the Kingdom of the Crystal Skull	$272,150,927	
2015	Furious 7	$397,627,459	
2017	The Fate of the Furious	$541,937,239	

== Highest-grossing films by year ==
The following is a list of highest grossing action films by year.

† Background shading indicates films playing in the week commencing 22 October 2026 in theaters around the world.

Year	Title	Worldwide box office (est.)		Budget	Ref
Year	Title	Gross	Tickets	Budget	Ref
1918	Tarzan of the Apes	$1,000,000	?	?	
1932	Tarzan the Ape Man	$2,540,000	54,000,000	$652,675	
1937	Elephant Boy	$6,200,000	26,000,000	?	
1940	Boom Town	$13,100,000	56,016,397	$1,600,000	
1941	Billy the Kid	$6,300,000	25,000,000	$1,411,000	
1942	The War at Sea from Hawaii to Malaya	$18,000,000	100,000,000	$380,000	
1943	The Outlaw	$20,000,000	48,300,000	$3,400,000	
1944	Thirty Seconds Over Tokyo	$6,200,000	20,601,673	$2,900,000	
1945	Objective, Burma!	$3,961,000	13,952,192	$1,592,000	
1946	Duel in the Sun	$20,408,163	62,028,544	$8,000,000	
1947	Unconquered	$6,665,592	18,102,260	$4,371,593	
1948	The Young Guard	$12,000,000	42,400,000	?	
1949	Battleground	$13,100,000	38,935,981	$1,631,000	
1950	Broken Arrow	$3,600,000	11,057,101	?	
1951	The African Queen	$10,750,000	28,060,285	$1,000,000	
1952	High Noon	$12,000,000	14,466,990	$730,000	
1952	Aan (The Savage Princess)	$6,042,410	30,000,000	$740,000	(Note: See Aan § Box office)
1953	Shane	$20,000,000	47,995,086	$1,500,000	
1954	Seven Samurai	$11,000,000	11,483,096	$556,000	(Note: See List of highest-grossing Japanese films § Box office ticket sales.)
1954	The High and the Mighty	$10,400,000	23,542,316	$1,470,000	
1955	Strategic Air Command	$6,500,000	13,000,000	?	
1955	Azaad	$6,000,000	21,000,000	?	
1956	Around the World in 80 Days	$42,000,000	91,428,972	$6,000,000	
1957	Gunfight at the O.K. Corral	$11,750,000	27,983,361	$2,000,000	
1958	The Vikings	$15,000,000	16,529,540	$3,500,000	
1959	Ben-Hur	$146,900,000	168,893,565	$15,200,000	
1960	Spartacus	$59,999,883	124,783,920	$12,000,000	
1960	Mughal-e-Azam (The Great Mughal)	$24,000,000	150,000,000	$2,250,000	
1961	Ganga Jamna	$23,600,000	84,000,000	?	(Note: See Ganga Jamna § Box office)
1962	Lawrence of Arabia	$69,995,047	85,542,933	$15,000,000	(Note: Lawrence of Arabia admissions: United States – 58,213,000; United Kingdom, Spain, Portugal – 10,375,327; Italy and France – 13,312,198; Germany – 3,552,000; South Korea (Seoul City) – 90,408)
1963	How the West Was Won	$46,500,000	75,020,224	$14,400,000	
1963	Apache Gold (Winnetou the Warrior)	$41,900,000	78,126,887	$1,000,000	(Note: See Apache Gold § Box office)
1964	Goldfinger	$124,900,000	100,150,318	$3,000,000	
1965	Thunderball	$141,200,000	122,235,389	$9,000,000	
1965	Tunnel War	$39,000,000	300,000,000	?	
1966	The Good, the Bad and the Ugly	$38,900,000	44,405,688	$1,200,000	(Note: See Dollars Trilogy § Box office performance)
1967	Bonnie and Clyde	$70,000,000	58,345,531	$2,500,000	
1968	Bullitt	$42,301,256	37,444,612	$4,000,000	
1968	The Shield and the Sword	$19,000,000	68,300,000	?	
1969	Butch Cassidy and the Sundance Kid	$102,315,881	84,863,424	$6,000,000	
1970	Airport	$128,400,000	69,741,320	$10,200,000	
1971	Diamonds Are Forever	$115,999,985	46,057,042	$7,200,000	
1971	Caravan	$44,000,000	319,000,000	?	(Note: See Caravan (1971 film) § Box office)
1972	The Godfather	$285,000,000	128,176,173	$7,200,000	
1973	Enter the Dragon	$400,000,000	139,000,000	$850,000	
1974	The Towering Inferno	$203,336,412	91,950,376	$14,000,000	
1975	Jaws	$490,736,300	243,277,230	$7,000,000	
1975	Sholay (Embers)	$70,000,000	250,021,329	$4,200,000	(Note: See 1975 in film § Worldwide gross.)
1976	Rocky	$225,000,000	67,339,279	$1,000,000	(Note: Rocky (1975) admissions: United States, Spain, France, Sweden – 59,813,000; United Kingdom – 6,000,000; Germany and Italy – 1,170,671; South Korea (Seoul City) – 355,608)
1976	Manhunt (Kimi yo Fundo no Kawa o Watare)	$70,000,000	434,420,000	$1,700,000	
1977	Smokey and the Bandit	$300,000,000	60,795,601	$5,300,000	(Note: Smokey and the Bandit admissions: United States and Spain – 58,614,553; France and Germany – 2,181,048)
1978	Every Which Way but Loose	$104,268,727	47,253,976	$5,000,000	
1978	The Glacier Fox	$27,000,000	103,700,000	?	(Note: See The Glacier Fox § Release)
1979	Rocky II	$200,182,160	40,860,797	$7,000,000	(Note: Rocky II admissions: United States – 35,199,000; United Kingdom – 4,000,000; France and Italy – 1,022,774; South Korea (Seoul City) – 244,234; Germany – 227,978; Sweden – 166,811)
1979	Gunshots in the CIB (Baomi Ju de Qiangsheng)	$116,000,000	600,000,000	?	
1980	Any Which Way You Can	$70,687,344	28,451,631	$15,000,000	
1980	Murder in 405 (405 mou sha an)	$67,000,000	600,000,000	$194,000	
1981	Raiders of the Lost Ark	$389,925,971	107,227,185	$18,000,000	
1981	The Xi'an Incident	$54,000,000	450,000,000	?	
1982	Rocky III	$270,000,000	54,423,966	$17,000,000	(Note: Rocky III admissions: USA, France, Germany, Italy – 46,664,464; Japan – 4,000,000; UK – 1,900,000; Spain and Sweden – 1,643,750; South Korea (Seoul City) – 215,752)
1982	Shaolin Temple	$111,872,509	500,994,065	$264,000	(Note: See Shaolin Temple (1982 film) § Box office)
1983	WarGames	$124,600,000	29,398,974	$12,000,000	
1983	Wudang (The Undaunted Wudang)	$61,000,000	610,000,000	?	
1984	Beverly Hills Cop	$316,360,478	82,060,394	$13,000,000	(Note: Beverly Hills Cop admissions: United States, Spain, Denmark – 69,103,402; France, Germany, Italy – 7,499,810; United Kingdom – 3,000,000; Japan – 2,200,000; South Korea (Seoul City) – 257,182)
1984	Deadly Fury (Pride's Deadly Fury)	$45,000,000	500,000,000	?	
1985	Rocky IV	$300,473,716	58,848,048	$28,000,000	(Note: Rocky IV admissions: United States – 36,224,000; France, Spain, Sweden – 7,587,671; Japan – 6,500,000; United Kingdom – 3,800,000; Germany – 3,309,379; Italy – 1,334,987; South Korea (Seoul City) – 92,011)
1985	Holy Robe of the Shaolin Temple	$18,000,000	200,000,000	?	
1986	Top Gun	$363,992,074	75,399,326	$15,000,000	(Note: Top Gun admissions: United States and United Kingdom – 54,800,000; Japan – 8,800,000; France, Spain, Italy – 5,866,313; Germany – 4,438,047; Denmark, Sweden, Netherlands, Norway – 1,215,991; South Korea (Seoul City) – 278,975)
1986	Great Shanghai 1937 (Da Shang Hai 1937)	$11,000,000	121,000,000	?	
1987	Beverly Hills Cop II	$299,965,036	55,298,153	$20,000,000	(Note: Beverly Hills Cop II admissions: United States, Spain, Sweden, Denmark – 41,592,270; France, Germany, Italy – 7,058,414; United Kingdom – 3,600,000; Japan – 3,000,000; South Korea (Seoul City) – 47,469)
1987	Mirage (Hai shi shen lou)	$10,000,000	113,000,000	?	
1988	Crocodile Dundee II	$239,606,210	81,748,039	$14,000,000	
1988	Yellow River Fighter	$10,000,000	130,000,000	?	
1989	Indiana Jones and the Last Crusade	$474,171,806	81,096,864	$48,000,000	(Note: Indiana Jones and the Last Crusade admissions: United States – 49,790,000; France, Germany, Italy, Spain – 16,422,965; Japan – 9,000,000; United Kingdom – 4,200,000; Sweden, Denmark, Netherlands – 1,192,889; South Korea (Seoul City) – 491,010)
1990	Die Hard 2	$240,031,274	?	$70,000,000	
1991	Robin Hood: Prince of Thieves	$390,493,908	?	$48,000,000	
1992	Lethal Weapon 3	$321,731,527	?	$35,000,000	
1993	The Fugitive	$368,875,760	?	$44,000,000	
1994	True Lies	$378,882,411	?	$115,000,000	
1995	Die Hard with a Vengeance	$366,101,666	?	$90,000,000	
1996	Twister	$494,580,615	72,915,191	$92,000,000	
1997	Tomorrow Never Dies	$339,504,276	?	$110,000,000	
1998	Saving Private Ryan	$482,352,390	73,188,812	$70,000,000	
1999	The World Is Not Enough	$361,730,660	?	$135,000,000	
2000	Mission: Impossible 2	$546,388,108	82,961,486	$125,000,000	(Note: Mission: Impossible 2 admissions: United States – 40,336,000; France, Italy, Spain – 9,719,133; Other European countries – 16,244,903; Japan – 7,700,000; China – 5,000,000; Brazil – 2,730,817; South Korea (Seoul City) – 1,230,633)
2001	Pearl Harbor	$449,220,945	57,535,427	$140,000,000	
2002	Die Another Day	$431,971,116	57,155,173	$142,000,000	
2003	The Last Samurai	$456,810,575	54,175,104	$140,000,000	(Note: The Last Samurai admissions: United States, Japan, Brazil – 33,243,101; France – 2,213,315; Other European countries – 17,455,488; South Korea – 1,263,200)
2004	Troy	$497,409,852	?	$175,000,000	
2005	Mr. & Mrs. Smith	$487,287,646	52,099,009	$110,000,000	
2006	Casino Royale	$616,577,552	58,722,968	$150,000,000	
2007	National Treasure: Book of Secrets	$459,242,249	47,372,710	$130,000,000	
2008	Indiana Jones and the Kingdom of the Crystal Skull	$786,636,033	79,458,033	$185,000,000	
2009	Sherlock Holmes	$524,028,679	63,600,000	$90,000,000	
2010	Robin Hood	$321,669,741	33,133,898	$200,000,000	
2011	Mission: Impossible – Ghost Protocol	$694,713,380	81,748,732	$145,000,000	(Note: Mission: Impossible – Ghost Protocol admissions: United States and Russia – 29,344,216; China, Japan, Mexico, Brazil, Argentina – 28,782,878; South Korea – 7,575,899; United Kingdom – 3,200,000; Other European countries – 12,845,739)
2012	Skyfall	$1,108,594,137	130,400,000	$200,000,000	
2013	Fast & Furious 6	$788,683,342	76,700,000	$160,000,000	
2014	300: Rise of an Empire	$337,580,051	36,700,000	$110,000,000	
2015	Furious 7	$1,515,342,457	137,100,000	$190,000,000	
2016	Jason Bourne	$415,484,914	83,200,000	$120,000,000	
2017	The Fate of the Furious	$1,238,764,765	241,900,000	$250,000,000	
2018	Mission: Impossible – Fallout	$791,658,205	153,300,000	$178,000,000	
2019	Fast & Furious Presents: Hobbs & Shaw	$760,732,926	116,800,000	$200,000,000	
2020	The Eight Hundred	$461,421,559	80,996,756	$80,000,000	(Note: The Eight Hundred admissions: China – 80,919,900; United States – 40,694; Europe – 19,537; South Korea – 16,625)
2021	The Battle at Lake Changjin	$913,000,000	125,059,009	$200,000,000	
2022	Top Gun: Maverick	$1,495,696,292	165,600,000	$177,000,000	
2023	Fast X	$704,875,015	74,200,000	$340,000,000	
2024	Gladiator II	$462,180,717	43,800,000	$250,000,000	
2025	F1	$634,042,436	54,200,000	$200,000,000+	
2026	Blades of the Guardians	$214,440,000	31,636,545	$123,000,000	(Note: Blades of the Guardians admissions: China – 31,488,333; United States – 142,000; United Kingdom – 6,212)

== Highest-grossing film franchises ==
The following is a list of highest grossing film series and franchises. The top 3 are along the highest-grossing film series and franchises of all time, being, 5th, 8th and 16th. James Bond is the highest-grossing action film series with over $7.83 billion, while Top Gun has the best average with $933.6 million per film.

Highest-grossing franchises and film series^{[§]}(The films in each franchise can be viewed by selecting "show".)

Rank	Series	Total worldwide gross	No. of films	Average of films	Highest-grossing film

1	James Bond	$7,836,585,237	27	$290,243,898	Skyfall ($1,108,594,137)
Eon series / $7,634,840,519 / 25 / $305,393,621 / Skyfall ($1,108,594,137); / Daniel Craig series / $3,969,612,775 / 5 / $793,922,555 / Skyfall ($1,108,594,137); 1 / Skyfall (2012) / $1,108,594,137; 2 / Spectre (2015) / $880,707,597; 3 / No Time to Die (2021) / $774,153,007; 4 / Casino Royale (2006) / $616,577,552; 5 / Quantum of Solace (2008) / $589,580,482 / Pierce Brosnan series / $1,479,008,618 / 4 / $369,752,155 / Die Another Day ($431,971,116); 1 / Die Another Day (2002) / $431,971,116; 2 / The World Is Not Enough (1999) / $361,832,400; 3 / GoldenEye (1995) / $352,194,034; 4 / Tomorrow Never Dies (1997) / $333,011,068 / Roger Moore series / $1,151,600,000 / 7 / $164,514,286 / Moonraker ($210,300,000); 1 / Moonraker (1979) / $210,300,000; 2 / For Your Eyes Only (1981) / $194,900,000; 3 / The Spy Who Loved Me (1977) / $185,400,000; 4 / Octopussy (1983) / $183,700,000; 5 / A View to a Kill (1985) / $152,400,000; 6 / Live and Let Die (1973) / $126,400,000; 7 / The Man with the Golden Gun (1974) / $98,500,000 / Sean Connery series / $621,500,000 / 6 / $103,583,333 / Thunderball ($141,200,000); 1 / Thunderball (1965) / $141,200,000; 2 / Goldfinger (1964) / $124,900,000; 3 / Diamonds Are Forever (1971) / $116,000,000; 4 / You Only Live Twice (1967) / $101,000,000; 5 / From Russia with Love (1963) / $78,900,000; 6 / Dr. No (1962) / $59,500,000 / Timothy Dalton series / $347,400,000 / 2 / $173,700,000 / The Living Daylights ($191,200,000); 1 / The Living Daylights (1987) / $191,200,000; 2 / Licence to Kill (1989) / $156,200,000 / George Lazenby series / $64,600,000 / 1 / $64,600,000 / On Her Majesty's Secret Service ($64,600,000); 1 / On Her Majesty's Secret Service (1969) / $64,600,000
Never Say Never Again (1983) / $160,000,000
Casino Royale (1967) / $41,744,718

2
Fast & Furious
$7,323,967,668
11
$665,815,243
Furious 7 ($1,515,342,457)

	The Fast Saga	$6,563,234,742	10	$656,323,474	Furious 7 ($1,515,342,457)
1	Furious 7 (2015)	$1,515,342,457			
2	The Fate of the Furious (2017)^{F8}	$1,238,764,765			
3	Fast & Furious 6 (2013)	$788,683,342			
4	F9 (2021)	$726,229,501			
5	Fast X (2023)	$704,875,015			
6	Fast Five (2011)	$626,140,012			
7	Fast & Furious (2009)	$360,366,870			
8	2 Fast 2 Furious (2003)	$236,350,661			
9	The Fast and the Furious (2001)	$207,517,509			
10	Tokyo Drift (2006)	$158,964,610			

Hobbs & Shaw (2019)	$760,732,926

3	Mission: Impossible	$4,741,544,709	8	$592,693,089	Fallout ($791,658,205)
1	Fallout (2018)	$791,658,205			
2	Ghost Protocol (2011)	$694,713,380			
3	Rogue Nation (2015)	$682,716,636			
4	The Final Reckoning (2025)	$598,767,057			
5	Dead Reckoning Part One (2023)	$571,125,435			
6	Mission: Impossible 2 (2000)	$546,388,108			
7	Mission: Impossible (1996)	$457,696,391			
8	Mission: Impossible III (2006)	$398,479,497			

4	Indiana Jones	$2,367,071,009	5	$473,414,202	Kingdom of the Crystal Skull ($786,636,033)
1	Kingdom of the Crystal Skull (2008)	$786,636,033			
2	Last Crusade (1989)	$474,171,806			
3	Raiders of the Lost Ark (1981)	$389,925,971			
4	Dial of Destiny (2023)	$383,229,928			
5	Temple of Doom (1984)	$333,107,271			

5
Rocky
$1,934,254,407
9
$214,917,156
Rocky IV ($300,373,716)

	Original series	$1,271,322,322	6	$211,887,054	Rocky IV ($300,473,716)
1	Rocky IV (1985)	$300,473,716			
2	Rocky III (1982)	$270,000,000			
3	Rocky (1976)	$225,000,000			
4	Rocky II (1979)	$200,182,160			
5	Rocky Balboa (2006)	$155,720,088			
6	Rocky V (1990)	$119,946,358			

	Creed series	$662,932,085	3	$220,977,362	Creed III ($275,248,615)
1	Creed III (2023)	$275,248,615			
2	Creed II (2018)	$214,115,889			
3	Creed (2015)	$173,567,581			

6	Top Gun	$1,867,252,529	2	$933,626,265	Maverick ($1,503,260,455)
1	Maverick (2022)	$1,503,260,455			
2	Top Gun (1986)	$363,992,074			

7	Bourne	$1,636,988,243	5	$327,397,649	The Bourne Ultimatum ($442,824,138)
1	Ultimatum (2007)	$442,824,138			
2	Jason Bourne (2016)	$415,484,914			
3	Supremacy (2004)	$288,500,217			
4	Legacy (2012)	$276,144,750			
5	Identity (2002)	$214,034,224			

8	The Battle at Lake Changjin	$1,539,571,280	2	$769,785,640	The Battle at Lake Changjin ($913,000,000)
1	The Battle at Lake Changjin (2021)	$913,000,000			
2	The Battle at Lake Changjin II (2022)	$626,571,280			

9	Die Hard	$1,440,546,330	5	$288,109,266	Live Free or Die Hard ($388,156,011)
1	Live Free or Die Hard (2007)	$388,156,011			
2	With a Vengeance (1995)	$366,101,666			
3	A Good Day to Die Hard (2013)	$304,654,182			
4	Die Hard 2 (1990)	$240,031,274			
5	Die Hard (1988)	$141,603,197			

10	Bad Boys	$1,245,796,023	4	$311,449,006	For Life ($496,415,322)
1	For Life (2020)	$426,505,244			
2	Ride or Die (2024)	$404,544,199			
3	Bad Boys II (2003)	$273,339,556			
4	Bad Boys (1995)	$141,407,024			

11
John Wick
$1,166,143,148
5
$233,228,630
John Wick: Chapter 4 ($440,146,694)

	Main Series	$1,028,926,563	4	$257,231,641	John Wick: Chapter 4 ($440,146,694)
1	Chapter 4 (2023)	$440,146,694			
2	Chapter 3 – Parabellum (2019)	$328,349,387			
3	Chapter 2 (2017)	$174,348,632			
4	John Wick (2014)	$86,081,850			

Ballerina (2025)	$137,216,585

12	Sherlock Holmes	$1,067,877,097	2	$533,938,549	A Game of Shadows ($543,848,418)
1	A Game of Shadows (2011)	$543,848,418			
2	Sherlock Holmes (2009)	$524,028,679			

13	Kingsman	$1,047,372,747	4	$261,843,187	Kingsman: The Secret Service ($414,351,546)
1	Kingsman: The Secret Service (2015)	$414,351,546			
2	Kingsman: The Golden Circle (2017)	$410,902,662			
3	The King's Man (2021)	$125,897,478			
4	Argylle (2024)	$96,221,061			

14	Lethal Weapon	$955,237,243	4	$238,809,311	Lethal Weapon 3 ($321,731,527)
1	Lethal Weapon 3 (1992)	$321,731,527			
2	Lethal Weapon 4 (1998)	$285,444,603			
3	Lethal Weapon 2 (1989)	$227,853,986			
4	Lethal Weapon (1987)	$120,207,127			

15	Wolf Warrior	$951,736,770	2	$475,868,385	Wolf Warrior 2 ($870,325,439)
1	Wolf Warrior 2 (2017)	$870,325,439			
2	Wolf Warrior (2015)	$81,411,331			

16	Taken	$929,451,015	3	$309,817,005	Taken 2 ($376,141,306)
1	Taken 2 (2012)	$376,141,306			
2	Taken 3 (2014)	$326,479,141			
3	Taken (2008)	$226,830,568			

17	Gladiator	$927,696,965	2	$463,848,483	Gladiator ($465,516,248)
1	Gladiator (2000)	$465,516,248			
2	Gladiator II (2024)	$462,180,717			

18	Jack Ryan	$898,987,699	5	$179,797,540	The Hunt for Red October ($200,512,643)
1	The Hunt for Red October (1990)	$200,512,643			
2	The Sum of All Fears (2002)	$193,921,372			
3	Clear and Present Danger (1994)	$190,991,067			
4	Patriot Games (1992)	$178,051,587			
5	Shadow Recruit (2014)	$135,511,030			

19	Twister	$866,842,880	2	$433,421,440	Twister ($494,580,615)
1	Twister (1996)	$494,580,615			
2	Twisters (2024)	$372,262,265			

20	The Expendables	$850,483,789	4	$212,620,947	The Expendables 2 ($314,975,955)
1	The Expendables 2 (2012)	$314,975,955			
2	The Expendables (2010)	$274,470,394			
3	The Expendables 3 (2014)	$214,657,577			
4	Expend4bles (2023)	$46,379,863			

^{*}Canada and U.S. gross only.

^{R}Distributor rental.

== See also ==
- List of action films
- Lists of highest-grossing films
