= Shadow over the Islands =

1952 film

- Schatten über den Inseln
- Directed by: Otto Meyer
- Written by: Kurt Adalbert
- Produced by: Walter Lehmann
- Starring: Erwin Geschonneck
- Cinematography: Eugen Klagemann
- Edited by: Hildegard Tegener
- Music by: Herbert Trantow
- Production company: DEFA
- Distributed by: Progress Film
- Release date: 16 May 1952
- Running time: 98 minutes
- Country: East Germany
- Language: German

Shadow over the Islands (German: Schatten über den Inseln) is an East German black-and-white film, directed by Otto Meyer. It was released in 1952.

== Plot ==
In a small village on the Faroe Islands, the people's only source of income is trapping a local breed of wild birds. The corrupt capitalist Mr. Brause exploits the locals, forcing them to work for a low wage while selling the birds with a high profit. A disease strikes the village, and many inhabitants become ill. A local physician, Dr. Stefan Horn, discovers that the source of the sickness is the birds. He sends a telegram to a medical research institute in Copenhagen. The scientists in the capital corroborate his suspicions. Brause destroys their letter and tells the villagers that they can continue with their trade. Eventually, Stefan and his cousin, Arne, manage to expose the truth before the people. Brause flees the islands.

== Cast ==
- Erwin Geschonneck as Dr. Sten Horn
- Fritz Diez as Arne Horn
- Willy A. Kleinau as Bassen Brause
- Kriemhild Falke as Mette Horn
- Siegfried Weber as Thorsten Horn
- Lutz Götz as Dr. Jakobson
- Georg Kröning as Dr. Mattisson
- Hans Jungbauer as Mikkelson
- Ernst Kahler as Kanvala
- Walter B. Schulz as secretary Falberg
- Rudolf Wessely as secretary Palle
- Kurt Mühlhardt as police chief Almquist
- Herbert Richter as Magnus
- Gert Schäfer, as Per
- Hans Wehrl as Mac Tunck

== Production ==
1952 saw the East German film industry sink to the lowest point in its history. Due to increasing supervision by the Socialist Unity Party, manifested in the new DEFA Commission of the SED's Politburo that oversaw the eponymous film studio, many productions were canceled or thoroughly censored to ensure compliance with the state's ideological line. DEFA produced only six films during 1952. Under the influence of the nascent Cold War, five of them contrasted life in the Socialist Eastern Bloc with life in the West. Among those, four dealt with the subject directly, while Shadow over the Islands was an allegory, using the setting of a Faroese village for presenting the same theme.

== Reception ==
Miera and Antonin Liehm cited Shadow over the Islands as an example to the East German films in which a positive hero - always with working-class background - was confronted by a negative one, which was mostly a former Nazi or a representative of the West, and often both. They concluded that at the time, "directors did not even try for anything than the simplest stories, filmed in the most straightforward ways. For instance... Shadow over the Islands... shows how capitalist merchants threaten the health of the people." Sylvia Klötzer shared this view, writing that the film was a typical example of the DEFA pictures produced during the early 1950s, with a schematic plot centered on an archetypical character with little depth. Author Udo Benzenhöfer, on the contrary, commented that the picture was a "realistic one, with many references to the broader issues of society."
