= The Fifth Horseman Is Fear =

- Theatrical release poster
- Directed by: Zbyněk Brynych
- Written by: Hana Bělohradská; Zbyněk Brynych
- Based on: Bez krásy, bez límce by Hana Bělohradská
- Starring: Miroslav Macháček; Olga Scheinpflugová; Jiří Adamíra
- Cinematography: Jan Kališ
- Edited by: Miroslav Hájek
- Music by: Jiří Sternwald
- Production company: Filmové studio Barrandov
- Distributed by: Ústřední půjčovna filmů
- Release date: 12 February 1965 (Czechoslovakia)
- Running time: 100 minutes
- Country: Czechoslovakia
- Language: Czech

The Fifth Horseman Is Fear (Czech: A pátý jezdec je strach) is a 1965 Czechoslovak film about the Holocaust that was directed by Zbyněk Brynych. Instead of depicting gas chambers and concentration camps, the film examines the subtler but equally debilitating mental effects of oppression. It gets its name from the story of the Four Horsemen of the Apocalypse written about in the Book of Revelation.

The film uses expressionist cinematography, and its film score is set to discordant piano music.

== Plot ==
Set in Prague during the German occupation of Czechoslovakia, the film follows Dr. Braun, a Jewish doctor forbidden to practice medicine. He instead works for German officials, cataloging confiscated Jewish property. All Braun wants to do is survive, but his pragmatic mentality is challenged when an injured resistance fighter stumbles into his apartment building. A quest for morphine leads Dr. Braun through his tortured city, where fear eats away at the social structure.

The film presents a setting where underlying societal breakdown is conveyed through psychological distress and social alienation among the characters. Although specific historical atrocities are not depicted visually, their enduring impact is reflected in the pervasive atmosphere of fear and deprivation experienced by Dr. Braun and his neighbors in Prague.

The film is scored with discordant piano music and full of expressionist cinematography. At the beginning, the camera follows Dr. Braun through his work, where exaggerated shots lend themselves to symbolic interpretation. For example, in one scene, Dr. Braun stands silently in front of a wall full of ticking confiscated clocks. Clocks serve as a symbol for time; and the Jews who lost their clocks also had their time on Earth taken from them.

Later, short choppy shots of the doctor's home work act as exposition. A small pile of books and an empty jar of milk hint at poverty and intellect. His neglected violin suggests passion and creativity that has been suppressed; and his small bedroom window, which shows a solitary smoking chimney, subtly alludes to the horrors of the Holocaust.

Towards the end of the film, a voice from the radio, declares in a monotone voice, "The longer the war lasts the greater is our faith in the final victory." Not a voice of hope, Brynych's film sends out a message of despair.

== Cast ==
- Miroslav Macháček as Dr. Armin Braun
- Olga Scheinpflugová as Music teacher
- Jiří Adamíra as Lawyer Karel Veselý, owner of the building
- Zdenka Procházková as Marta Veselá
- Josef Vinklář as Vlastimil Fanta
- Ilja Prachař as Butcher Šidlák
- Jana Prachařová as Věra Šidláková
- Jiří Vršťala as Inspector
- Tomáš Hádl as Honzík Veselý
- Eva Svobodová as Landlady Kratochvílová
- Karel Nováček as Resistance member Pánek
- Čestmír Řanda as Dr. Emil Wiener
- Slávka Budínová as Helena Wienerová
- Iva Janžurová as Maid Anička

== Reception ==
When the film was released in the United States in 1968, it was praised by critics. Time magazine said it was a "superlatively photographed film," and Roger Ebert wrote, "It comes as a shock, in the last ten minutes, to discover how deeply involved you have become. [It is] unmistakably the work of a master, and I can only wonder whether Brynych has made other films or if his ability is natural, as Fellini seems to be. I mention Fellini because this film seems to have what Fellini and very few other directors are able to achieve: A sense of rhythm." and "A nearly perfect film...beautiful, distinguished work. I imagine it will win the Academy Award for the best foreign film." On the review aggregator website Rotten Tomatoes, 100% of 8 critics' reviews are positive.
