= The Magellanic Cloud =

1955 novel by Stanisław Lem

- First edition
- Author: Stanisław Lem
- Original title: Obłok Magellana
- Cover artist: Jan Młodożeniec
- Language: Polish
- Genre: Science fiction
- Publisher: Iskry
- Publication date: 1955
- Publication place: Poland
- Pages: 422
- LC Class: PG7158.L399 O2
- Preceded by: The Astronauts
- Followed by: Sezam

The Magellanic Cloud (Polish title: Obłok Magellana) is a 1955 science fiction novel by Polish writer Stanisław Lem. Fragments of the novel were published earlier, in 1953 and 1954, in the magazine Przekrój. Lem characterized the novel as an "extract of the times of Socialist realism".

In 1963, the novel was adapted into the Czechoslovak film Ikarie XB-1.

== Plot summary ==
The novel is set in the 32nd century, in a communistic Utopian future. Humanity has colonized all of the Solar System, and is now making its first attempt at interstellar travel.

Aboard a vessel called Gaia, 227 men and women leave the Earth for the Alpha Centauri system.

After almost eight years of travel, they find signs of organic life on a planet orbiting Proxima Centauri, possibly originating on another planet within the Centauri system.

The expedition meets an old artificial war satellite of the United States and its NATO allies. It was carrying still active biological weapons and nuclear warheads, which had accidentally left Earth orbit and got lost in space during the Cold War era, and the team destroys it.

Gaia detects a radar signal directed at it, coming from one of the planets of Alpha Centauri. "Gaia" approaches this planet and tries to contact its civilization, but all messages remain unanswered. When they attempt to land on a planet, they are unexpectedly attacked, and 10 astronauts are killed. Nevertheless, the crew of Gaia does not strike back, supposing the inhabitants of the planet mistook a peaceful landing for aggression. Eventually the contact was established.

== Censorship and criticisms ==
When the novel was first published, parts of it were censored by the Communist authorities. Lem denounced the censored version, calling it too optimistic about Communism. Specifically, he banned the translation of the novel into Japanese. A complete version was published in the 1990s in post-Communist Poland.

Because at the time of writing cybernetics was a banned "bourgeois pseudoscience", Lem invented the term mechaneurystyka ("mechanheuristics").
