= Clown Ferdinand =

Fictional character

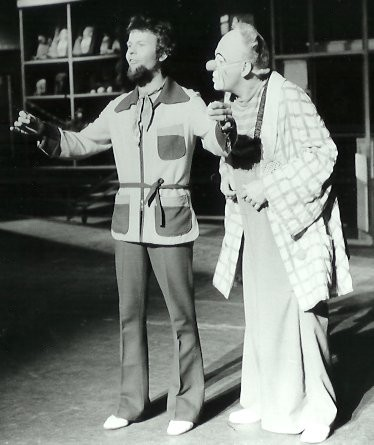
Clown Ferdinand (Jiří Vršťala) and magician Peter Kersten

Clown Ferdinand (Czech: Klaun Ferdinand) is a fictional character from a number of Czechoslovak and later East German children TV series and films, played by actor Jiří Vršťala. The character was created by screenwriter Ota Hofman and film director Jindřich Polák.

== Series ==
=== Czechoslovak series ===
- 1959 Klaun Ferdinand jede do města (TV film)
- 1959 Klaun Ferdinand jede do televize (TV film)
- 1959 Klaun Ferdinand peče dort (TV film)
- 1959 Klaun Ferdinand u moře (TV film)
- 1959 Klaun Ferdinand uklízí (TV film)
- 1963 Klaun Ferdinand a chemie (TV film)
- 1963 Klaun Ferdinand a raketa - Czech children's science fiction film by Jindřich Polák
- 1965 Klaun Ferdinand chce spát (German title: Klaun Faerdinand will schlafen)

=== East German series ===
- 1969 - Der Weihnachtsmann heißt Willi - (film)
- 1978 - Ferdinand, was nun? - (TV)
- 1979 - Ferdinand rettet die Sonne - (TV)
- 1980 - Ferdinand wird Vater - (TV)
- 1981 - Ferdinand sucht den Regenbogen - (TV)
- 1983 - Ferdinand im Reich der Töne - (TV)
