= Jiří Vršťala =

Czech actor

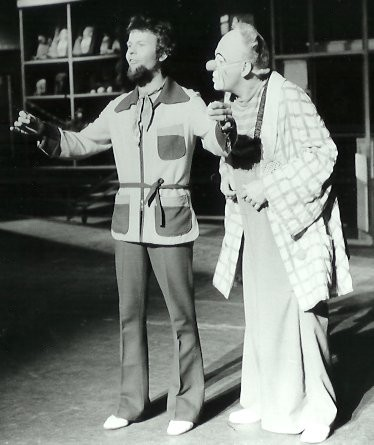
- Jiří Vršťala (as Clown Ferdinand) and magician Peter Kersten
- Born: 31 July 1920; Liberec, Czechoslovakia
- Died: 10 June 1999 (aged 78); Berlin, Germany
- Occupation: Actor
- Years active: 1950-1987

Jiří Vršťala (31 July 1920 – 10 June 1999) was a Czech film actor. He appeared in more than fifty films from 1950 to 1987.

== Selected filmography ==
Film
Year	Title	Role	Notes
1968	I, Justice		
1967	Frozen Flashes		
1966	The Sons of Great Bear		
1966	The Escape in the Silent		
1965	The Story of a Murder		
