= A Game without Rules =

- Directed by: Jindřich Polák
- Written by: Jindřich Polák, Václav Šašek
- Starring: Svatopluk Matyáš, Jiří Adamíra
- Cinematography: Rudolf Milič
- Music by: Wiliam Bukový
- Release date: April 14, 1967
- Running time: 89 minutes
- Country: Czechoslovakia
- Language: Czech

A Game without Rules (Czech: Hra bez pravidel) is a 1967 Czechoslovak crime thriller film directed by Jindřich Polák. The movie is about a policeman Málek who kills a robber in self-defense and leaves the police to investigate on his own.

== Plot ==
Shop manager Kubát and his assistant Litera are injured in a robbery. Policeman Málek investigates the robbery. He believes that Litera is involved in the robbery. Two robbers crash their car and one of them dies. The other one is shot by Málek who tracks him down. Málek is unable to find jewellery or to prove Litera's involvement and quits police. He becomes a taxi driver but keeps investigating the case.

== Cast ==
- Svatopluk Matyáš as Málek
- Jiří Adamíra as Litera
- Zdeněk Kryzánek as Burian
- Karla Chadimová as Alena
- Vladimír Menšík as Pepi
- Josef Bláha as Klement
- František Šťastný as Franta
- Jan Tříska as Duda
