= Jindřich Polák =

- Born: 5 May 1925; Prague, Czechoslovakia
- Died: 22 August 2003 (aged 78); Prague, Czech Republic
- Occupation: Film director
- Years active: 1958–1992

Jindřich Polák (5 May 1925 – 22 August 2003) was a Czech film and television director. He is known for his science fiction productions, but worked in many different genres.

== Filmography ==
Year	Czech Title	English Title	Length	Notes
1959	Smrt v sedle	Death in the Saddle	81 minutes	
1961	Páté oddělení	The Fifth Division	89 minutes	
1963	Klaun Ferdinand a raketa	Clown Ferdinand and the Rocket	72 minutes	
1963	Ikarie XB-1	Voyage to the End of the Universe	86 minutes	Loosely based on a novel by Stanisław Lem, The Magellanic Cloud.
1965	Strašná žena	The Figure Skater and Fidelity	81 minutes	Musical, comedy
1967	Hra bez pravidel	A Game without Rules	89 minutes	Action, crime film
1968	Nebeští jezdci	Riders in the Sky	92 minutes	War film
1977	Noc klavíristy	Piano Player’s Night	83 minutes	Crime film
1977	Zítra vstanu a opařím se čajem	Tomorrow I'll Wake Up and Scald Myself with Tea	90 minutes	Adaptation of Josef Nesvadba's short story with the same title
1979	Smrt stopařek	Death of Hitch-Hikers	87 minutes	Crime film
1979	Od zítřka nečaruji	I Won’t Conjure After Today	84 minutes	Children's film
1984	Lucie, postrach ulice	Lucy, Terror of the Street	74 minutes	Children's film
1984	...A zase ta Lucie!	Lucy Again	82 minutes	Children's film
1987	Chobotnice z II. patra	The Octopuses from the Second Floor	92 minutes	Children's film
1987	Veselé Vánoce přejí chobotnice	Merry Christmas from the Octopuses!	92 minutes	Children's film
1993	Kačenka a strašidla	Cathy and the Ghosts	84 minutes	Children's film
1993	Kačenka a zase ta strašidla	Cathy and Those Ghosts Again	91 minutes	Children's film

=== Television series ===
Year	Czech Title	English Title	Notes
1969-1988	Pan Tau	Mr. Tau	
1983	Návštěvníci	The Visitors	
