= List of French films of 1984 =

A list of films produced in France in 1984.

French films released in 1984
Title	Director	Cast	Genre	Notes
Barbarous Street	Giloles Béhat	Bernard Giraudeau, Christine Boisson, Jean-Pierre Kalfon	Crime	
Black List	Alain Bonnot	Annie Girardot, Paul Crauchet	Crime	
The Blood of Others	Claude Chabrol	Jodie Foster, Michael Ontkean, Sam Neill	Drama, war	French–Canadian co-production
Boy Meets Girl	Leos Carax	Denis Lavant, Mireille Perrier, Carroll Brooks	Drama, romance	
Carmen	Francesco Rosi	Julia Migenes Johnson, Plácido Domingo, Ruggero Raimondi	Musical	French–Italian co-production
Cheaters (Tricheurs)	Barbet Schroeder	Jacques Dutronc, Bulle Ogier	Drama	
Emmanuelle 4	Francis Leroi, Iris Letans	Sylvia Kristel, Mia Nygren, Patrick Bauchau	Adult	
Fort Saganne	Alain Corneau	Gérard Depardieu, Catherine Deneuve, Philippe Noiret	Epic, romance	
Full Moon in Paris	Éric Rohmer	Pascale Ogier, Tchéky Karyo, Fabrice Luchini	Comedy-drama	
Happy Easter	Georges Lautner	Jean-Paul Belmondo, Sophie Marceau, Marie Laforêt	Comedy	
Klassenverhältnisse	Straub–Huillet	Christian Heinisch, Mario Adorf, Nazzareno Bianconi	Drama	West German–French co-production
L'Amour à mort	Alain Resnais	Sabine Azéma, Pierre Arditi, Fanny Ardant	Drama	
Le tartuffe	Gérard Depardieu	Gérard Depardieu, François Périer, Paule Annen	Comedy	
Les Morfalous	Henri Verneuil	Jean-Paul Belmondo, Jacques Villeret, Michel Constantin	Adventure	
Les Trottoirs de Bangkok	Jean Rollin	Yoko, Françoise Blanchard, Gérard Landry	Spy	
Monster Shark	Lamberto Bava	Michael Sopkiw, Valentine Monnier, Gianni Garko	Horror	Italian–French co-production
My New Partner	Claude Zidi	Philippe Noiret, Thierry Lhermitte, Grace de Capitani	Comedy	
Paris, Texas	Wim Wenders	Harry Dean Stanton, Nastassja Kinski, Dean Stockwell		West German–French co-production
The Perils of Gwendoline in the Land of the Yik-Yak	Just Jaeckin	Tawny Kitaen, Brent Huff, Jean Rougerie	Adventure	
The Pirate	Jacques Doillon	Jane Birkin, Philippe Léotard, Maruschka Detmers	Drama	
The Public Woman	Andrzej Żuławski	Francis Huster, Valérie Kaprisky, Lambert Wilson	Drama	
Success Is the Best Revenge	Jerzy Skolimowski	Michael York, Joanna Szczerbic, Michael Lyndon		British–French co-production
A Sunday in the Country	Bertrand Tavernier	Louis Ducreux, Sabine Azéma, Michel Aumont	Drama	
Swann in Love	Volker Schlöndorff	Jeremy Irons, Ornella Muti, Alain Delon	Drama	West German–French co-production
The Twin	Yves Robert	Pierre Richard, Carey More, Camilla More	Comedy	
