= Néstor Almendros =

Spanish cinematographer (1930-1992)

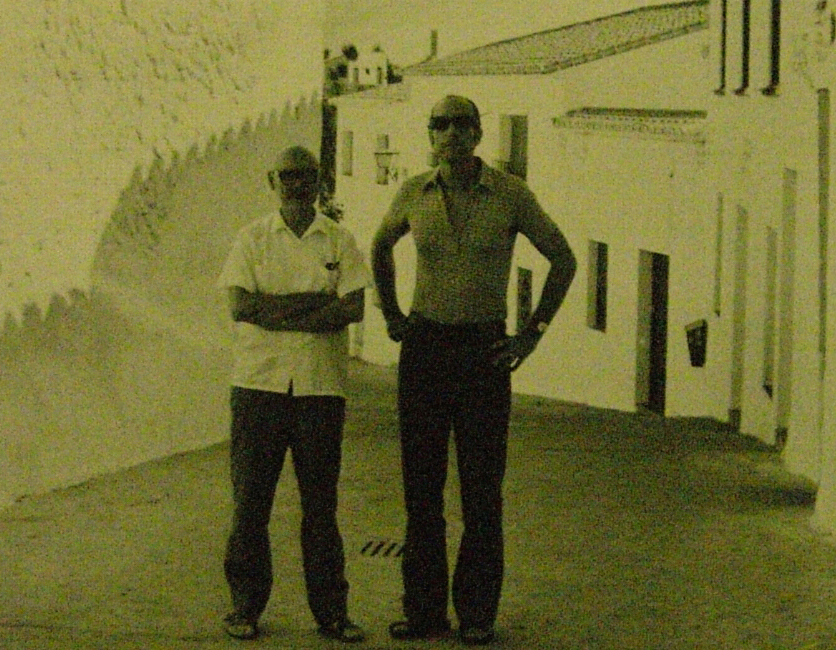
- Néstor Almendros (right) in 1968
- Born: Néstor Almendros Cuyás; 30 October 1930; Barcelona, Catalonia, Spain
- Died: 4 March 1992 (aged 61); New York City, U.S.
- Resting place: Calders, Catalonia, Spain
- Occupation: Cinematographer
- Years active: 1950–1991
- Organization: American Society of Cinematographers

Néstor Almendros Cuyás, ASC (30 October 1930 – 4 March 1992) was a Spanish cinematographer.

He was one of the most highly appraised contemporary cinematographers, having a working collaboration with filmmakers François Truffaut, Éric Rohmer and Robert Benton, while winning an Oscar for Best Cinematography for Terrence Malick's Days of Heaven.

== Early life ==
Almendros was born in Barcelona, Spain, the son of Herminio Almendros and Maria Cuyás.

At the age of 18, he moved to Cuba to join his exiled anti-Francisco Franco father. While staying in Havana, studied at the Universidad de La Habana and wrote film reviews.

Almendros then went on to study film in Rome at the Centro Sperimentale di Cinematografia.

He directed six shorts in Cuba and two in New York City.

== Career ==
=== Early career ===
After the Cuban Revolution ended in 1959, Almendros returned to Spain and made several documentaries about the Castro regime. But after two of his shorts (Gente en la playa and La tumba francesa) were banned, he moved to Paris.

=== French New Wave ===
Almendros became the favorite collaborator of French New Wave director Éric Rohmer. In the early 70s, he also started working with François Truffaut, Barbet Schroeder and other directors.

=== Hollywood career ===
Director Terrence Malick admired Almendros' work on Truffaut’s The Wild Child (1970), prompting him to hire Almendros to shoot Days of Heaven (1978), for which he won the Academy Award for Best Cinematography.

Almendros was impressed by Malick's knowledge of photography and his willingness to use little studio lighting. The film's cinematography was modeled after silent films, which often used natural light.

Along with three other nominations for Best Cinematography, Almendros became the Spanish person with the most nominations in Academy history.

=== Later career ===
In his later years, Almendros co-directed two documentaries about the human rights situation in Cuba: Improper Conduct (1984) about the persecution of gay people in the country; and Nadie escuchaba (Nobody Listened), about the alleged arrest, imprisonment and torture of former comrades of Fidel Castro.

Almendros also shot several prestigious advertisements for Giorgio Armani (directed by Martin Scorsese), Calvin Klein (directed by Richard Avedon) and Freixenet.

== Legacy and honors ==
Human Rights Watch International has named an award after him by establishing the Nestor Almendros Award for Courage in Filmmaking and it is given every year at the Human Rights Watch International Film Festival.

In 1980, Almendros won the César Award for François Truffaut's The Last Metro.

== Death ==
In 1992, Néstor Almendros died of AIDS-related lymphoma in New York City at the age of 61.

== Filmography ==
=== Cinematographer ===
==== Short film ====
Year	Title	Director	Notes
1950	Una confusión cotidiana	Himself; Tomás Gutiérrez Alea	
1964	Nadja à Paris	Éric Rohmer	
1965	Saint-Germain-des-Prés	Jean Douchet	Segments of Six in Paris
1965	Place de l'Etoile	Éric Rohmer	Segments of Six in Paris
1989	Life Lessons	Martin Scorsese	Segment of New York Stories

==== Feature film ====
Year	Title	Director	Notes
1967	La Collectionneuse	Éric Rohmer	
1968	The Wild Racers	Daniel Haller	With Daniel Lacambre
1969	More	Barbet Schroeder	
1969	My Night at Maud's	Éric Rohmer	
1969	The Gun Runner	Richard Compton	With Arch Archambault
1970	The Wild Child	François Truffaut	
1970	Paddy	Daniel Haller	Uncredited
1970	Bed and Board	François Truffaut	
1970	Claire's Knee	Éric Rohmer	
1971	Two English Girls	François Truffaut	
1972	La Vallée	Barbet Schroeder	
1972	Love in the Afternoon	Éric Rohmer	
1973	L'oiseau rare	Jean-Claude Brialy	
1973	Poil de carotte	Henri Graziani	
1974	The Mouth Agape	Maurice Pialat	
1974	Femmes au soleil	Liliane Dreyfus	
1974	Cockfighter	Monte Hellman	
1974	My Little Loves	Jean Eustache	
1975	The Story of Adele H.	François Truffaut	
1976	Maîtresse	Barbet Schroeder	
1976	The Marquise of O	Éric Rohmer	
1976	Des journées entières dans les arbres	Marguerite Duras	
1977	The Man Who Loved Women	François Truffaut	
1977	Change of Sex	Vicente Aranda	
1977	Madame Rosa	Moshé Mizrahi	
1978	The Green Room	François Truffaut	
1978	Days of Heaven	Terrence Malick	
1978	Goin' South	Jack Nicholson	
1978	Perceval le Gallois	Éric Rohmer	
1979	Love on the Run	François Truffaut	
1979	Kramer vs. Kramer	Robert Benton	
1980	The Blue Lagoon	Randal Kleiser	
1980	The Last Metro	François Truffaut	
1982	Still of the Night	Robert Benton	
1982	Sophie's Choice	Alan J. Pakula	
1983	Pauline at the Beach	Éric Rohmer	
1983	Confidentially Yours	François Truffaut	
1984	Places in the Heart	Robert Benton	
1986	Heartburn	Mike Nichols	
1987	Nadine	Robert Benton	
1991	Billy Bathgate	Robert Benton	

==== Television ====
Year	Title	Director	Notes
1971	La Brigade des maléfices	Claude Guillemot	Episode "La créature"

==== Documentary works ====
Short film

Year	Title	Director	Notes
1959	El Tomate	Fausto Canel	
1959	Cooperativas Agropecuarias	Fausto Canel	
1960	Gente en la playa	Himself	
1966	Une étudiante d'aujourd'hui	Éric Rohmer	
1967	La journée d'un journaliste	Himself	
1971	Le Cochon aux patates douces	Barbet Schroeder	
1971	Maquillages	Barbet Schroeder	
1971	Sing Sing	Barbet Schroeder	
1983	L'Assemblea de Catalunya	Carlos Durán	With Juan Amorós
1990	Made in Milan	Martin Scorsese	

Television

Year	Title	Director	Notes
1967	Fermière à Montfaucon	Éric Rohmer	TV short
1972	Chroniques de France	Jacques Scandelari; Max Gérard; Jean-Daniel Simon	Episode "Chroniques de France N° 82"

Film

Year	Title	Director	Notes
1974	General Idi Amin Dada: A Self Portrait	Barbet Schroeder	
1975	The Gentleman Tramp	Richard Patterson	With Bruce Logan
1977	Beaubourg, centre d'art et de culture Georges Pompidou	Roberto Rossellini	
1978	Koko: A Talking Gorilla	Barbet Schroeder	
1988	Imagine: John Lennon	Andrew Solt	

=== Director ===
Short film

Year	Title	Notes
1950	Una confusión cotidiana	Co-directed with Tomás Gutiérrez Alea

Documentary short

Year	Title	Director	Writer	Producer	Notes
1960	Gente en la playa	Yes	No	Yes	
1960	Ritmo de Cuba	Yes	Yes	No	
1967	La journée d'un journaliste	Yes	No	No	
1968	Retour d'Henri Langlois à Paris	Yes	No	No	Co-directed with Bernard Eisenschitz

Documentary film

Year	Title	Director	Writer	Producer	Notes
1960	Escuelas rurales	Yes	No	No	
1984	Improper Conduct	Yes	Yes	No	Co-directed with Orlando Jiménez Leal
1987	Nadie escuchaba	Yes	No	Yes	Co-directed with Jorge Ulla

== Awards and nominations ==
Year	Award	Category	Title	Result
1978	Academy Awards	Best Cinematography	Days of Heaven	Won
1979	Academy Awards	Best Cinematography	Kramer vs. Kramer	Nominated
1980	Academy Awards	Best Cinematography	The Blue Lagoon	Nominated
1982	Academy Awards	Best Cinematography	Sophie's Choice	Nominated
1978	British Society of Cinematographers	Best Cinematography in a Feature Film	Days of Heaven	Nominated
1978	César Awards	Best Cinematography	The Green Room	Nominated
1979	César Awards	Best Cinematography	Perceval le Gallois	Nominated
1980	César Awards	Best Cinematography	The Last Metro	Won
1982	New York Film Critics Circle	Best Cinematographer	Sophie's Choice	Won
1984	New York Film Critics Circle	Best Cinematographer	Places in the Heart	Nominated

== See also ==
- List of Spanish Academy Award winners and nominees
