= The Venerable W. =

- Film poster
- French: Le vénérable W.
- Directed by: Barbet Schroeder
- Produced by: Margaret Menegoz
- Music by: Jorge Arriagada
- Production company: Les Films du Losange
- Distributed by: Les Films du Losange
- Release date: May 2017 (Cannes)
- Running time: 100 minutes
- Countries: France, Switzerland
- Languages: Burmese, English, French, Spanish

The Venerable W. (French: Le vénérable W.) is a 2016 documentary film by Swiss director Barbet Schroeder. Schroeder explores the daily occurrences of racism and Islamophobia within Burmese society and how Buddhist monk Ashin Wirathu inflames the hatred within Myanmar's Buddhist majority population towards its Muslim minority through his rhetoric, which has catalysed riots and religious tensions.

The film premiered at the 2017 Cannes Film Festival was released in France in June 2017 and in Switzerland in November 2017. It is his last film in Schroeder‘s "Trilogy of Evil" which also consists of General Idi Amin Dada: A Self Portrait (1974) and Terror's Advocate (2007).

== Synopsis ==
Schroeder focuses on the life of Ashin Wirathu, an influential and anti-muslim Burmese Buddhist monk. Through his rhetoric, he has inflamed Myanmar's Buddhist majority population to commit acts of violence and persecutions towards the country's Muslim minority. These acts and persecutions were committed not just by Wirathu's ardent followers but also by certain people within the government of Myanmar. Houses owned by Muslims were burned down and thousands had no choice but to leave the country.

== Production ==
Schroeder admitted that he and his crew initially pretended to be foreign tourists. However, after about a month he realised that Myanmar's military police were following them. They even took photos of him and his crew visiting Myanmar's Muslim population. It did not take him long to leave the country.

== Reception ==
The Guardian's Peter Bradshaw wrote that some of the scenes in the film reminded him of similar scenes in Joshua Oppenheimer's documentaries on Indonesian genocide The Act of Killing and The Look of Silence as well as Matthew Heineman's documentary on ISIS brutality in Raqqa, Syria City of Ghosts. He was also reminded of Belgian radio presenter Georges Ruggiu who provoked ethnic Hutu to attack against ethnic Tutsi in the lead up to the Rwandan genocide.

Variety's Jay Weissberg wrote that The Venerable W. reminded him of Schroeder's previous film, A Self Portrait, which even after the release of both films, both Idi Amin and Ashin Wirathu, the leading characters of respective film, are still influential and destructive.
