= 1984 in film =

The following is an overview of events in 1984 in film, including the highest-grossing films, award ceremonies and festivals, a list of films released and notable deaths.

The year's highest-grossing film in the United States and Canada was Beverly Hills Cop. Ghostbusters overtook it, however, with a re-release the following year. It was the first time in five years that the top-grossing film did not involve George Lucas or Steven Spielberg although Spielberg directed and Lucas executive produced/co-wrote the third placed Indiana Jones and the Temple of Doom; Spielberg also executive produced the fourth placed Gremlins.

U.S. box office grosses reached $4 billion for the first time and it was the first year that two films had returned over $100 million to their distributors with both Ghostbusters and Indiana Jones and the Temple of Doom achieving this. Beverly Hills Cop made it three for films released in 1984 after its performance during 1985 took it to rentals of $108 million. Other popular films included The NeverEnding Story, which was the most expensive film produced in West Germany, The Karate Kid and Romancing the Stone. A high number of sci-fi/fantasy films were released in 1984.

== Highest-grossing films ==
=== United States ===
The top ten 1984 released films by box office gross in North America are as follows:

Highest-grossing films of 1984
Rank	Title	Distributor	Box-office gross
1	Beverly Hills Cop	Paramount	$234,760,478
2	Ghostbusters	Columbia	$229,242,989
3	Indiana Jones and the Temple of Doom	Paramount	$179,870,271
4	Gremlins	Warner Bros.	$153,083,102
5	The Karate Kid	Columbia	$90,815,558
6	Police Academy	Warner Bros.	$81,198,894
7	Footloose	Paramount	$80,035,402
8	Romancing the Stone	20th Century Fox	$76,572,238
9	Star Trek III: The Search for Spock	Paramount	$76,471,076
10	Splash	Buena Vista	$69,821,334

=== International ===
International market	Title	Director	Production country	Revenue	Admissions	Source(s)
Brazil	Gremlins	Joe Dante	United States	$1,505,985	—N/a	
France	Marche à l'ombre	Michel Blanc	France	—N/a	6,168,425	
Hong Kong	Aces Go Places 3	Tsui Hark	Hong Kong	HK$29,286,077	—N/a	
India	Tohfa	K. Raghavendra Rao	India	₹90,000,000	—N/a	
Italy	Indiana Jones and the Temple of Doom	Steven Spielberg	United States	—N/a	838,309	
Japan	Indiana Jones and the Temple of Doom	Steven Spielberg	United States	¥3,200,000,000	—N/a	
South Korea	Project A	Jackie Chan	Hong Kong	₩1,189,308,000	396,436	
Soviet Union	Disco Dancer	Babbar Subhash	India	$75,900,000	60,900,000	(Note: Disco Dancer in Soviet Union: US$75.9 million (Note: Disco Dancer: 60 million Soviet rubles in 1984, 0.791 rubles per US dollar in 1984) (₹94.34 crore) (Note: 12.43 Indian rupees per US dollar in 1984) in 1984)
Spain	Gremlins	Joe Dante	United States	$4,255,642	3,202,047	
United States and Canada	Beverly Hills Cop	Martin Brest	United States	$234,760,478	67,150,000	
West Germany	Police Academy	Hugh Wilson	United States	—N/a	5,187,443	

== Events ==
- February 15 - The Walt Disney Studios establishes Touchstone Pictures to release films with more mature subject matter than the traditional Walt Disney Pictures banner.
- March 30 - Romancing the Stone is released and propels Michael Douglas, Kathleen Turner, and Danny DeVito and director Robert Zemeckis to super-stardom. The film also gave Zemeckis his first box office hit, which gave Universal Pictures confidence to allow him to direct his next film, Back to the Future.
- April 6 - Tri-Star Pictures, a joint venture of Columbia Pictures, HBO, and CBS, releases its first film, Where the Boys Are '84.
- May 4 - The first of the year's breakdancing musicals is released, Breakin'. It is soon followed by Beat Street and its sequel, Breakin' 2: Electric Boogaloo.
- June 8 - Ghostbusters and Gremlins were released.
- July 1 - The Motion Picture Association of America institutes the PG-13 rating, as a response to violent horror films such as Gremlins and Indiana Jones and the Temple of Doom.
- July 9 - Joe Wizan leaves as president of 20th Century Fox Productions. Lawrence Gordon replaces him the following day.
- July 27 - Prince's first film Purple Rain is released.
- August 25 - Ghostbusters becomes the biggest grossing comedy film of all time in the United States exceeding Tootsie's $177.2 million going on to gross $229.2 million in its initial run. It is overtaken by Beverly Hills Cop in summer 1985 but regains the record after its re-release in August 1985. It also became the biggest grossing film released by Columbia Pictures.
- September - Lawrence Gordon is promoted to president and chief operating officer of the Fox Entertainment Group
- September 22 - Michael Eisner leaves Paramount Pictures to become head of Walt Disney Productions, while Frank Wells became chief operating officer and Jeffrey Katzenberg was later named chairman.
- October 8 - Ned Tanen becomes president of Paramount Pictures motion picture group.
- December 5 - Beverly Hills Cop is released. It will go on to become the 6th highest-grossing film of all time in the U.S. at the time, the highest grossing comedy of all time at the time, as well as the highest grossing R-Rated film of all time, a record it would hold for 19 years.
- December 14 - Dune is released after over a year of hype and anticipation.
- Annie's Coming Out wins 3 Australian Film Institute Awards including the Australian Film Institute Award for Best Film.

== Awards ==
Category/Organization	42nd Golden Globe Awards January 27, 1985		38th BAFTA Awards March 5, 1985	57th Academy Awards March 25, 1985
Category/Organization	Drama	Comedy or Musical	38th BAFTA Awards March 5, 1985	57th Academy Awards March 25, 1985
Best Film	Amadeus	Romancing the Stone	The Killing Fields	Amadeus
Best Director	Miloš Forman; Amadeus		Wim Wenders; Paris, Texas	Miloš Forman; Amadeus
Best Actor	F. Murray Abraham; Amadeus	Dudley Moore; Micki & Maude	Haing S. Ngor; The Killing Fields	F. Murray Abraham; Amadeus
Best Actress	Sally Field; Places in the Heart	Kathleen Turner; Romancing the Stone	Maggie Smith; A Private Function	Sally Field; Places in the Heart
Best Supporting Actor	Haing S. Ngor; The Killing Fields		Denholm Elliott; A Private Function	Haing S. Ngor; The Killing Fields
Best Supporting Actress	Peggy Ashcroft; A Passage to India		Liz Smith; A Private Function	Peggy Ashcroft; A Passage to India
Best Screenplay, Adapted	Amadeus; Peter Shaffer		The Killing Fields; Bruce Robinson	Amadeus; Peter Shaffer
Best Screenplay, Original	Amadeus; Peter Shaffer		Broadway Danny Rose; Woody Allen	Places in the Heart; Robert Benton
Best Original Score	Maurice Jarre; A Passage to India		Ennio Morricone; Once Upon a Time in America	Maurice Jarre; A Passage to India; Prince; Purple Rain
Best Original Song	"I Just Called to Say I Love You"; The Woman in Red		"Ghostbusters"; Ghostbusters	"I Just Called to Say I Love You"; The Woman in Red
Best Foreign Language Film	A Passage to India; United Kingdom		Carmen; France	Dangerous Moves; Switzerland

Palme d'Or (Cannes Film Festival):

Paris, Texas, directed by Wim Wenders, France / West Germany

Golden Lion (Venice Film Festival):

A Year of the Quiet Sun (Rok spokojnego slonca), directed by Krzysztof Zanussi, Poland

Golden Bear (Berlin Film Festival):

Love Streams, directed by John Cassavetes, United States

People's Choice Award (Toronto International Film Festival):

Places in the Heart, directed by Robert Benton, United States

== 1984 films ==
=== By country/region ===
- List of American films of 1984
- List of Argentine films of 1984
- List of Australian films of 1984
- List of Bangladeshi films of 1984
- List of British films of 1984
- List of Canadian films of 1984
- List of French films of 1984
- List of Hong Kong films of 1984
- List of Indian films of 1984
  - List of Hindi films of 1984
  - List of Kannada films of 1984
  - List of Malayalam films of 1984
  - List of Marathi films of 1984
  - List of Tamil films of 1984
  - List of Telugu films of 1984
- List of Japanese films of 1984
- List of Mexican films of 1984
- List of Pakistani films of 1984
- List of South Korean films of 1984
- List of Soviet films of 1984
- List of Spanish films of 1984

=== By genre/medium ===
- List of action films of 1984
- List of animated feature films of 1984
- List of avant-garde films of 1984
- List of comedy films of 1984
- List of drama films of 1984
- List of horror films of 1984
- List of science fiction films of 1984
- List of thriller films of 1984
- List of western films of 1984

== Births ==
- January 1
  - Amara Karan, English actress
  - Kollam Sudhi, Indian actor and comedian (d. 2023)
- January 6
  - Priit Loog, Estonian actor
  - Kate McKinnon, American actress, comedian and writer
- January 7 - Max Riemelt, German actor
- January 8 - Steven Kanumba, Tanzanian actor and director (d. 2012)
- January 12
  - Taraneh Alidoosti, Iranian actress
  - Sam Richardson, American actor, comedian, writer and producer
- January 15 - Victor Rasuk, American actor
- January 21
  - Luke Grimes, American actor and musician
  - Richard Gutierrez, Filipino actor and model
- January 24 - Justin Baldoni, American actor and director
- January 25 - Kaiji Tang, voice actor
- January 30 - Kid Cudi, American rapper, singer, songwriter, record producer, actor and fashion designer
- January 31 – Michael Aloni, Israeli actor
- February 1
  - Abbi Jacobson, American comedian, writer, actress and illustrator
  - Lee Thompson Young, American actor (d. 2013)
- February 6 - Brandon Hammond, American former child actor
- February 8 - Cecily Strong, American actress
- February 12 - Alexandra Dahlström, Swedish actress
- February 13 - Brina Palencia, voice actress
- February 18 - Genelle Williams, Canadian actress
- February 19 - Josh Trank, American director, screenwriter and editor
- February 20 - Trevor Noah, South African comedian, writer, producer, actor and television host
- February 21 - Karina, Japanese model and actress
- February 24 - Nicholas Saputra, Indonesian actor
- February 28
  - Melanie Chandra, American actress
  - Ali Marhyar, French actor, director and screenwriter
- February 29 - Rakhee Thakrar, English actress
- March 2
  - Blake Anderson, American actor, comedian, producer and screenwriter
  - John Bernecker, American stunt performer (d. 2017)
  - Ian Sinclair, voice actor
- March 7 - Brandon T. Jackson, American stand-up comedian, rapper, actor, and writer
- March 8 - Nora-Jane Noone, Irish actress
- March 10 - Olivia Wilde, American actress
- March 12 - Jaimie Alexander, American actress
- March 13
  - Rachael Bella, retired American actress
  - Noel Fisher, Canadian actor
- March 14 - Liesel Pritzker Simmons, American former actress
- March 20 - Christy Carlson Romano, American stage and film actress and singer
- March 25 - Katharine McPhee, American singer and actress
- March 27
  - Emily Ann Lloyd, American actress
  - Jon Paul Steuer, American actor and musician (d. 2018)
- April 2
  - Ashley Peldon, American actress
  - Shawn Roberts, Canadian actor
  - Deep Sidhu, Indian actor (d. 2022)
- April 3 - Chrissie Fit, American actress and singer
- April 4 - Carolina Gaitán, Colombian actress and singer
- April 5 - Jae Suh Park, American actress
- April 8
  - Taran Noah Smith, American actor
  - Kirsten Storms, American actress
- April 10
  - Cara DeLizia, American actress
  - Mandy Moore, American singer-songwriter and actress
- April 11 - Kelli Garner, American actress
- April 16 - Claire Foy, British actress
- April 18 - America Ferrera, Honduran-American actress
- April 25 - Jillian Bell, American comedian, actress and screenwriter
- April 26 - Ryan O'Donohue, American actor
- April 28 - Ana Cruz Kayne, American actress
- April 29 - Firass Dirani, Australian actor
- May 1 - Kerry Bishe, American actress
- May 3 - Marama Corlett, Maltese actress
- May 7 - Mark O'Brien, Canadian actor and director
- May 12 - Emily Beecham, British actress
- May 13 - Hannah New, English actress
- May 14 - Olly Murs, English singer-songwriter, presenter, voice actor and director
- May 17
  - Alejandro Edda, Mexican-American actor
  - Lena Waithe, American actress, producer and screenwriter
- May 21
  - Jon Beavers, American actor
  - Marnie Schulenburg, American actress (d. 2022)
- May 23 - Adam Wylie, American actor
- May 29 - Kaycee Stroh, American actress and singer
- May 30 - DeWanda Wise, American actress
- June 1 - Taylor Handley, American actor
- June 3 - Anne Yatco, American voice actor
- June 5 - Joel Smallbone, Australian-American singer and actor
- June 6 - Atandwa Kani, South African actor
- June 10 - Betsy Sodaro, American actress and voice actress
- June 13 - Phillip Van Dyke, American actor
- June 15 - Ray Santiago, American actor
- June 19 - Paul Dano, American actor
- June 21 - Shiv Panditt, Indian actor and television host
- June 24 - Lucien Dodge, voice actor
- June 25 - Killian Donnelly, Irish singer and actor
- June 26
  - Aubrey Plaza, American actress, comedian and producer
  - Wen Zhang, Chinese actor
- June 29 - Carla Medina, Mexican singer, actress and television host
- June 30 - Fantasia Barrino, American singer and actress
- July 1
  - Jared Keeso, Canadian actor
  - Cyron Melville, Danish actor and musician
- July 2 - Vanessa Lee Chester, American actress
- July 7 - Ross Malinger, American actor
- July 9 - Hanna R. Hall, American actress
- July 10 - Aviva Baumann, American actress
- July 11
  - Serinda Swan, Canadian actress
  - Rachael Taylor, Australian actress
- July 12
  - Chad Brownlee, Canadian actor and musician
  - Mikaela Hoover, American actress
  - Natalie Martinez, American actress
- July 14 - Britta Soll, Estonian actress
- July 17 - Mary Nighy, English actress and filmmaker
- July 18 - Marie Meyer, French actress
- July 19
  - Kaitlin Doubleday, American actress
  - Alessandra De Rossi, Filipina actress
  - Andrea Libman, Canadian actress, voice actress, pianist, and singer
- July 20 - Jacky Heung, Hong Kong actor
- July 25 - Zawe Ashton, English actress, playwright, director and narrator
- July 27
  - Taylor Schilling, American actress
  - Kenny Wormald, American actor
- July 28 - John David Washington, American actor and producer
- July 29 - J. Madison Wright Morris, American actress (d. 2006)
- July 30
  - Gina Rodriguez, Puerto Rican-American actress and director
  - Gabrielle Christian, American actress and singer
- August 2 - Uli Latukefu, Australian actor and singer
- August 3
  - Jon Foster, American actor and musician
  - Emily Baldoni, Swedish actress
  - Kyle Schmid, Canadian actor
- August 7 – Hsu Wei-ning, Taiwanese actress and model
- August 10 – Mariel Rodriguez, Filipina actress and model
- August 12
  - Chauntal Lewis, American actress
  - Marian Rivera, Filipino actress
- August 13 - Eme Ikwuakor, American actor
- August 15 - Quinton Aaron, American actor
- August 19 - Simon Bird, English actor, director and comedian
- August 24 - Cameron Goodman, American actress
- August 26 - Jennifer Higham, British actress
- August 28
  - Richard Cabral, American actor, producer and writer
  - Him Law, Hong Kong actor
  - Sarah Roemer, American actress
- August 31 - Wolfgang Cerny, Austrian actor and producer
- September 3
  - Garrett Hedlund, American actor
  - Paz de la Huerta, American actress and model
- September 4 - Kyle Mooney, American actor, comedian and writer
- September 5 - Annabelle Wallis, English actress
- September 10 - Luke Treadaway, British actor and singer
- September 14
  - Adam Lamberg, American actor
  - Ayushmann Khurrana, Indian actor
- September 17 - Mark Shandii Bacolod, Filipino director and producer (d. 2022)
- September 18
  - Nina Arianda, American actress
  - Babs Olusanmokun, Nigerian-American actor
- September 19
  - Lydia Hearst, American actress and model
  - Kevin Zegers, Canadian actor and model
- September 21 - Ahna O'Reilly, American actress
- September 22 - Laura Vandervoort, Canadian actress
- September 22 - Jordan Vogt-Roberts, American film director
- September 23 - Anneliese van der Pol, Dutch-American actress and singer
- September 24 - Lara Jean Chorostecki, Canadian actress
- September 25 - Zach Woods, American actor and comedian
- September 27 - Avril Lavigne, Canadian singer-songwriter
- October 1
  - Beck Bennett, American actor, comedian and writer
  - Josh Brener, American actor
- October 2 - John Morris, American actor
- October 3
  - Chris Marquette, American actor
  - Jessica Parker Kennedy, Canadian actress
  - Ashlee Simpson, American actress and singer
- October 4
  - James Landry Hébert, American actor
  - Rachel McDowall, English actress
  - Will Theakston, former English actor
- October 5
  - Tiana Benjamin, English actress
  - Nathalie Kelley, Peruvian actress
  - Yelena Velikanova, Russian actress
- October 7 - Andy Bean, American actor
- October 10 - Chiaki Kuriyama, Japanese actress and singer
- October 11 - Martha MacIsaac, Canadian actress
- October 14 - Jason Davis, American actor (d. 2020)
- October 17 - Chris Lowell, American actor
- October 18
  - Tod Fennell, Canadian actor
  - Freida Pinto, Indian actress
  - Jennifer Ulrich, German actress
- October 25 - Katy Perry, American singer-songwriter and actress
- October 27
  - Kelly Osbourne, English actress and singer
  - Emilie Ullerup, Danish actress
- October 28 - Finn Wittrock, American actor and screenwriter
- November 1 - Natalia Tena, English actress and musician
- November 6 - Patina Miller, American actress and singer
- November 10
  - Britt Irvin, Canadian actress and voice artist
  - Naoki Kobayashi, Japanese actor and singer
- November 13
  - Sarah Rose Karr, American former child actress
  - Slavko Sobin, Crotian actor
- November 15 - Asia Kate Dillon, American actor
- November 16 - Kimberly J. Brown, American actress
- November 17
  - Jonathan Howard, English actor
  - Lauren Maltby, American actress
- November 18 - Nayanthara, Indian actress
- November 21
  - Lindsey Haun, American actress and singer
  - Jena Malone, American actress
- November 22 - Scarlett Johansson, American actress
- November 23 - Lucas Grabeel, American actor and singer
- November 24 - Max Bennett, English actor
- November 25 - Gaspard Ulliel, French actor (d. 2022)
- November 28
  - Mary Elizabeth Winstead, American actress
  - Trey Songz, American singer and actor
- November 30
  - Carole Weyers, Belgian actress
  - Lydia Wilson, English-American actress
- December 5
  - Ryan Binse, American film producer
  - Lauren London, American actress
- December 11
  - Sandra Echeverría, Mexican actress and singer
  - Xosha Roquemore, American actress
- December 14 - Jackson Rathbone, American actor, singer and musician
- December 16 - Theo James, English actor and producer
- December 17 - Tennessee Thomas, British drummer and actress
- December 19 - Ankita Lokhande, Indian actress
- December 23 - Alison Sudol, American actress, singer and songwriter
- December 24 - Austin Stowell, American actor
- December 25
  - Mike Rianda, American cartoonist, director, screenwriter and voice actor
  - Georgia Tennant, English actress
- December 29
  - Chris Pang, Australian actor and producer
  - Sean Stone, American actor and filmmaker

== Deaths ==
Month	Date	Name	Age	Country	Profession	Notable films
January	6	Ernest Laszlo	85	Hungary	Cinematographer	Judgment at Nuremberg; Logan's Run
January	7	Walter Forde	85	UK	Director	Chu Chin Chow; The Ghost Train
January	11	Jack La Rue	70	US	Actor	A Farewell to Arms; The Story of Temple Drake
January	20	Johnny Weissmuller	79	US	Actor	Tarzan the Ape Man; Jungle Jim
January	29	Frances Goodrich	93	US	Screenwriter	It's a Wonderful Life; Father of the Bride
February	11	Arlette Marchal	82	France	Actress	The Cat's Pajamas; Blonde or Brunette
February	15	Ethel Merman	76	US	Singer, Actress	It's a Mad, Mad, Mad, Mad World; There's No Business Like Show Business
February	17	Lucille Benson	69	US	Actress	Little Fauss and Big Halsy; Mame
February	29	Kenneth Strickfaden	87	US	Set Designer	Frankenstein; Young Frankenstein
March	1	Jackie Coogan	69	US	Actor	The Kid; Million Dollar Legs
March	1	Ronald Culver	83	UK	Actor	Dead of Night; Down to Earth
March	4	William E. Snyder	82	US	Cinematographer	Creature from the Black Lagoon; The Loves of Carmen
March	5	William Powell	91	US	Actor	The Thin Man; My Man Godfrey
March	6	Henry Wilcoxon	78	Dominica	Actor	The Crusades; Samson and Delilah
March	10	I. S. Johar	64	India	Actor	Lawrence of Arabia; Death on the Nile
March	18	Paul Francis Webster	76	US	Lyricist	Calamity Jane; Love Is a Many-Splendored Thing
March	20	Richard L. Van Enger	69	US	Film Editor	Sands of Iwo Jima; Johnny Guitar
March	21	Sam Leavitt	80	US	Cinematographer	The Defiant Ones; Cape Fear
March	24	Sam Jaffe	93	US	Actor	The Asphalt Jungle; Gunga Din
March	27	Jack Donohue	75	US	Director, Choreographer	Marriage on the Rocks; Babes in Toyland
March	27	Derek Francis	60	UK	Actor	Jabberwocky; A Christmas Carol
March	28	Carmen Dragon	69	US	Composer	Invasion of the Body Snatchers; Cover Girl
April	1	George Glass	73	US	Producer	Guess Who's Coming to Dinner; One-Eyed Jacks
April	2	William C. Thomas	80	US	Producer, Director	The Big Caper; They Made Me a Killer
April	7	Samuel G. Engel	79	US	Producer, Screenwriter	My Darling Clementine; Night and the City
April	10	Ray Middleton	77	US	Actor	I Dream of Jeanie; 1776
April	13	Richard Hurndall	73	UK	Actor	I, Monster; The Prince and the Pauper
April	14	Thorold Dickinson	80	UK	Director, Film Editor	The Next of Kin; Gaslight
April	15	Glen MacWilliams	85	US	Cinematographer	Lifeboat; The Clairvoyant
April	16	Byron Haskin	84	US	Director	The War of the Worlds; I Walk Alone
April	18	Francis de Wolff	71	UK	Actor	From Russia with Love; The Hound of the Baskervilles
April	18	John Lee Mahin	81	US	Screenwriter	Show Boat; Heaven Knows, Mr. Allison
April	25	Richard Benedict	64	Italy	Actor	Ace in the Hole; Ocean's 11
April	26	May McAvoy	84	US	Actress	Ben-Hur; The Jazz Singer
May	4	Diana Dors	52	UK	Actress	Lady Godiva Rides Again; The Unholy Wife
May	10	Robert Moore	57	US	Director	Murder By Death; Chapter Two
May	12	Ben Roberts	68	US	Screenwriter	White Heat; Man of a Thousand Faces
May	13	Antonio Castillo	75	Spain	Costume Designer	Nicholas and Alexandra; Beauty and the Beast
May	16	Andy Kaufman	35	US	Actor	God Told Me To; Heartbeeps
May	16	Irwin Shaw	71	US	Screenwriter	The Talk of the Town; The Young Lions
May	20	Peter Bull	72	UK	Actor	Dr. Strangelove; The African Queen
May	21	Andrea Leeds	72	US	Actress	Stage Door; Swanee River
May	21	Ann Little	93	US	Actress	The Roaring Road; The Invaders
May	22	John Marley	76	US	Actor	The Godfather; Love Story
May	28	D'Urville Martin	45	US	Actor, Director	Black Caesar; Dolemite
June	1	Ruthelma Stevens	80	US	Actress	The Night Club Lady; The Circus Queen Murder
June	15	Ned Glass	78	Poland	Actor	Charade; West Side Story
June	17	Leslie I. Carey	88	US	Sound Engineer	The Glenn Miller Story; Touch of Evil
June	17	Nobuo Nakagawa	79	Japan	Director, Screenwriter	Jigoku; Vampire Moth
June	18	Luis Moglia Barth	81	Argentina	Director, Screenwriter	¡Tango!; Melodías porteñas
June	19	Sunny Johnson	30	US	Actress	Flashdance; The Night the Lights Went Out in Georgia
June	20	Estelle Winwood	101	UK	Actress	Darby O'Gill and the Little People; The Producers
June	22	Joseph Losey	75	US	Director	The Servant; Accident
June	24	William Keighley	94	US	Director	The Man Who Came to Dinner; Each Dawn I Die
June	26	Carl Foreman	69	US	Screenwriter, Producer	High Noon; The Guns of Navarone
June	30	Lillian Hellman	79	US	Screenwriter	The Little Foxes; Toys in the Attic
July	2	Lenore Coffee	87	US	Screenwriter	Young at Heart; Cash McCall
July	7	Flora Robson	82	UK	Actress	Fire Over England; Saratoga Trunk
July	11	Hugh Morton	81	UK	Actor	Man of the Moment; Quatermass and the Pit
July	14	Ernest Tidyman	56	US	Screenwriter	The French Connection; Shaft
July	23	Lloyd Gough	76	US	Actor	Sunset Boulevard; Earthquake
July	23	Anthony Sharp	69	UK	Actor	A Clockwork Orange; Barry Lyndon
July	24	Vincent Beck	59	US	Actor	...And Justice for All; Santa Claus Conquers the Martians
July	25	Akihiko Hirata	56	Japan	Actor	Sanjuro; Godzilla
July	26	Roger H. Lewis	66	US	Producer	The Swimmer; The Pawnbroker
July	27	James Mason	75	UK	Actor	North by Northwest; Lolita
July	29	Woodrow Parfrey	61	US	Actor	Papillon; Charley Varrick
August	2	Quirino Cristiani	88	Argentina	Director	El Apóstol; Peludópolis
August	4	Walter Burke	75	US	Actor	All the King's Men; Support Your Local Sheriff!
August	4	Mary Miles Minter	82	US	Actress	Anne of Green Gables; Nurse Marjorie
August	5	Richard Burton	58	UK	Actor	Who Afraid of Virginia Woolf?; Becket
August	5	Roland Kibbee	70	US	Screenwriter	The Crimson Pirate; Valdez Is Coming
August	8	Richard Deacon	63	US	Actor	The Young Philadelphians; The Birds
August	14	J. B. Priestley	89	UK	Screenwriter	Last Holiday; The Old Dark House
August	19	George Meeker	80	US	Actor	Apache Rose; Silver Trails
August	25	Truman Capote	59	US	Screenwriter, Actor	The Innocents; Beat the Devil
August	25	Henry Lynn	89	US	Director, Screenwriter	Shir Hashirim
August	29	Pina Menichelli	94	Italy	Actress	Take Care of Amelia; A Woman's Story
August	30	Emil Newman	73	US	Composer	Sun Valley Serenade; Hondo
September	3	Arthur Schwartz	83	US	Composer, Producer	The Band Wagon; Night and Day
September	6	E. J. André	76	US	Actor	The Ten Commandments; Papillon
September	9	Yılmaz Güney	47	Stateless	Director, Screenwriter, Actor	Yol; The Herd
September	11	William Sands	61	US	Film Editor	Funny Girl; The Only Game in Town
September	14	Janet Gaynor	77	US	Actress	A Star Is Born; 7th Heaven
September	17	Richard Basehart	70	US	Actor	Moby Dick; La Strada
September	19	June Preisser	64	US	Actress	Babes in Arms; Sweater Girl
September	24	Neil Hamilton	85	US	Actor	Laughing Sinners; Batman
September	25	Walter Pidgeon	87	Canada	Actor	Forbidden Planet; How Green Was My Valley
October	9	Joan Young	84	UK	Actress	Suddenly, Last Summer; The Fallen Idol
October	10	Leonard Rossiter	57	UK	Actor	2001: A Space Odyssey; Barry Lyndon
October	11	H. Bruce Humberstone	82	US	Director	I Wake Up Screaming; Charlie Chan at the Olympics
October	16	Peggy Ann Garner	52	US	Actress	A Tree Grows in Brooklyn; Nob Hill
October	21	François Truffaut	52	France	Director, Screenwriter, Actor	The 400 Blows; Jules and Jim
October	23	Oskar Werner	61	Austria	Actor	Fahrenheit 451; Ship of Fools
October	24	Walter Woolf King	84	US	Actor	A Night at the Opera; Go West
October	24	Edith Massey	66	US	Actress	Pink Flamingos; Polyester
October	25	Pascale Ogier	25	France	Actress	Full Moon in Paris; Le Pont du Nord
October	30	June Duprez	66	UK	Actress	The Four Feathers; And Then There Were None
October	31	Eduardo De Filippo	84	Italy	Actor, Screenwriter, Director	The Gold of Naples; Everybody Go Home
November	1	Norman Krasna	74	US	Screenwriter, Director	Who Was That Lady?; Sunday in New York
November	3	Milo Anderson	75	US	Costume Designer	The Adventures of Robin Hood; To Have and Have Not
November	7	George Mathews	73	US	Actor	Gunfight at the O.K. Corral; The Last Wagon
November	13	Dorothy Arnold	66	US	Actress	The Phantom Creeps; The House of Fear
November	20	Peter Welch	62	UK	Actor	The Admirable Crichton; The Secret Partner
December	2	Harry Sukman	72	US	Composer	Song Without End; Fanny
December	7	Jeanne Cagney	65	US	Actress	Yankee Doodle Dandy; Quicksand
December	8	Luther Adler	81	US	Actor	House of Strangers; D.O.A.
December	11	Robert E. Kent	73	US	Screenwriter	Rock Around the Clock; The Fastest Guitar Alive
December	11	George Waggner	81	US	Director	The Wolf Man; Horror Island
December	13	Margaret Livingston	89	US	Actress	The Lady Refuses; What a Widow!
December	19	Edward Carrere	78	Mexico	Art Director	Adventures of Don Juan; Camelot
December	24	Ian Hendry	53	UK	Actor	Repulsion; Get Carter
December	24	Peter Lawford	61	UK	Actor	Good News; Ocean's 11
December	24	Harry Waxman	72	UK	Cinematographer	The Wicker Man; Swiss Family Robinson
December	28	Sam Peckinpah	59	US	Director, Screenwriter	The Wild Bunch; Straw Dogs
December	29	Leo Robin	84	US	Songwriter	The Big Broadcast of 1938; Small Town Girl

== Film debuts ==
- Angélica Aragón – The Evil That Men Do
- Marshall Bell – Birdy
- Nigel Bennett – The Ninja Mission
- Geoffrey Blake – The Last Starfighter
- María Botto – Berta's Motives
- Jesse Bradford – Falling in Love
- Pascale Bussières – Sonatine
- Ralph Brown – The Hit
- Simon Callow – Amadeus
- Maggie Cheung – Prince Charming
- Jennifer Connelly – Once Upon a Time in America
- Jon Cryer – No Small Affair
- Isaach de Bankolé – Asphalt Warriors
- Johnny Depp – A Nightmare on Elm Street
- Gabino Diego – Bicycles Are for the Summer
- Tate Donovan – No Small Affair
- Richard Edson – Stranger Than Paradise
- Troy Evans – Rhinestone
- Rupert Everett – Another Country
- Sherilyn Fenn – The Wild Life
- John Finn – The Pope of Greenwich Village
- Colin Firth – Another Country
- Courtney Gains – Children of the Corn
- Zach Galligan – Gremlins
- Jsu Garcia – A Nightmare on Elm Street
- Sarah Michelle Gellar – Over the Brooklyn Bridge
- Bobcat Goldthwait – Massive Retaliation
- Heather Graham – Mrs. Soffel
- Seth Green – Billions for Boris
- Arye Gross – Exterminator 2
- Larisa Guzeyeva – A Cruel Romance
- Corey Haim – Firstborn
- Josh Hamilton – Old Enough
- Kadeem Hardison – Beat Street
- John Hawkes – Police Academy
- Yves Jacques – Sonatine
- Arsinée Khanjian – Next of Kin
- Val Kilmer – Top Secret!
- Patrick Kilpatrick – The Toxic Avenger
- John Leguizamo – Mixed Blood
- John Lynch – Cal
- Andie MacDowell – Greystoke: The Legend of Tarzan, Lord of the Apes
- Kyle MacLachlan – Dune
- Frances McDormand – Blood Simple
- Olga Merediz – The Brother from Another Planet
- Alyssa Milano – Old Enough
- Connie Nielsen – Par où t'es rentré ? On t'a pas vu sortir
- Miguel A. Núñez Jr. – Joy of Sex
- David O'Hara – Comfort and Joy
- Jay Patterson – Places in the Heart
- Lou Diamond Phillips – Interface
- Mike Pniewski – Beverly Hills Cop
- Clifton Powell – Alphabet City
- Aidan Quinn – Reckless
- Jan Rabson – Racing with the Moon
- Tracy Reiner – The Flamingo Kid
- Tim Robbins – Toy Soldiers
- Tim Roth – The Hit
- Nicholas Rowe – Another Country
- Emmanuelle Seigner – Year of the Jellyfish
- Craig Sheffer – Voyage of the Rock Aliens
- Rocco Sisto – Scream for Help
- Alexander Skarsgård – Åke and His World
- Stuart Stone – Heavenly Bodies
- Ice-T – Breakin'
- Brian Tarantina – The Cotton Club
- Brian Thompson – The Terminator
- Jennifer Tilly – No Small Affair
- Marisa Tomei – The Flamingo Kid
- Pip Torrens – Oxford Blues
- Ken Watanabe – MacArthur's Children
- Steven Weber – The Flamingo Kid
- Dana Wheeler-Nicholson – The Little Drummer Girl
- Alicia Witt – Dune
- Michelle Yeoh – The Owl vs Bombo
