= Gang of Four (film) =

1989 film

- French theatrical release poster
- Directed by: Jacques Rivette
- Written by: Pascal Bonitzer; Christine Laurent; Jacques Rivette
- Produced by: Martine Marignac
- Starring: Bulle Ogier
- Cinematography: Caroline Champetier
- Edited by: Catherine Quesemand
- Distributed by: Les Films du Losange
- Release date: February 6, 1989
- Running time: 160 minutes
- Country: France
- Language: French

Gang of Four (French: La bande des quatre) is a 1989 French drama film directed by Jacques Rivette. It was entered into the 39th Berlin International Film Festival, where it won a Honourable Mention.

== Plot ==
Four women (Anna, Claude, Joyce, and Cécile) live together on a small estate in suburban Paris and take acting classes in the city. One of the women, Cécile, moves out to be with her boyfriend leading to another woman, Lucia, moving in. Cécile's departure and reticence to provide many details about her move cause some concern although this is eclipsed by the routine of acting classes. These acting classes are held out of a derelict theater and taught by a demanding former-actress, Constance. Constance runs her theater more like a cult than a school: its membership is small, highly restrictive, and costly; students must fully dedicate themselves to Constance's classes, even if it means sacrificing their livelihood; and Constance's focus on non-constructive criticism keeps hers students insecure/committed for years. In turn, Constance's students seem to suffer from unwarranted hero worship for Constance. Constance's students never rehearse plays, only scenes interrupted by Constance's criticism.

In part because of Constance's many restrictions, her students live whimsical, bohemian lifestyles. Although their lifestyles are largely paid for by others, they are seemingly isolated from those around them. This frequently manifests in their manic or otherwise irrational behavior.

Joyce, Anna, and Claude each individually encounter an eccentric, enigmatic man. Joyce is the first to meet him and he provides her with his phone number, which she initially doesn't call. Anna later meets him at an art gallery although she brushes him off. She leaves the gallery alone but on her way out is encountered by a pair of purported thugs. The man conveniently rescues her from possible assault and offers to drive her home. On the car ride back, he introduces himself as an ex-business partner of Cécile's boyfriend. He claims that they used to make fraudulent ID cards together. He also claims that both Cécile and her boyfriend are now in a great deal of trouble. He somehow knows the exact route back to Anna's house without her directions, prompting concern by Anna.

Upon arriving home, Anna discusses her encounter with Joyce who advises that she had an unusual encounter with a similarly described man. Having kept the man's phone number, Anna and Joyce stage a meet-up with the man at a lounge. The man begins to tell Joyce that Cécile and her boyfriend are involved in a terroristic plot, with an arsenal of guns possibly stored at the estate. Joyce motions to Anna, unbeknownst to him sitting some distance away at the bar, so as to indicate that both are catching up to his ruse. However, he escapes any confrontation. The man turns out to be Thomas, a policeman investigating Cécile's boyfriend. He has been using aliases and invented backgrounds to get into the women's estate, which he believes will reveal a key to incriminating evidence of a judge's wrongdoings. The key is more than proverbial, it fell down Anna's chimney one night and was taken in secret by Lucia.

The film turns to the unhappiness and domestic strife the women encounter in their everyday lives, focusing largely on Claude. She is in love with a woman although the love is unrequited. Thomas meets with Claude and he introduces himself as an illicit art dealer. He takes advantage of Claude and has sex with her at the estate to look for the key. Unable to find the key, he continues his sexual relationship with Claude.

One evening, Claude spies on Cécile and sees her together with her boyfriend for the first time. Claude later watches a news broadcast and learns that Cécile's boyfriend has been arrested and charged with murder. However, the charge may be false and motivated by his failed whistleblowing attempt against the aforementioned judge.

Despite her moving out of the estate, Cécile continues to attend acting class but the quality of her performance has declined after the arrest of her boyfriend. However, when she learns that her boyfriend has escaped police custody and is on the lam, her acting improves. Constance cancels class after the news of the escape is shared. It is later implied that Constance may have been complicit with prior criminal wrongdoings, resulting in her later arrest by plainclothes policemen and subsequent disbandment of the theater.

Cécile attempts to find the key, realizing its importance to vindicating her boyfriend, but prematurely gives up. Thomas becomes far less cautious with his encounters at the estate in his efforts to find the key. Thomas reveals himself as a policeman to Anna, Claude, Joyce, and Lucia and refuses to leave the estate until he obtains the key. He tells them that the key can be used to unlock a secured box containing damning evidence against a judge, which he does not want released. Should they cooperate, Thomas claims he will coordinate Cécile's boyfriend's release. Lucia claims multiple times that she tossed the key into the Seine although Thomas does not believe her. Thomas knows that the key remains somewhere in the house. After five days of his living at the estate, Lucia attempts to murder Thomas with the same poison she used in her own suicide attempt but Thomas outsmarts her. He tries to make her drink the glass of poisoned whiskey she gave him but she drops it and it shatters. He then repeatedly shakes Lucia until the key falls off her person. Thomas attempts to escape the estate with the key in hand but is either knocked unconsciousness or killed by two blows of a barbell swung by Joyce.

Anna, Claude, Joyce, and Lucia conduct an infantile mock trial for Cécile's boyfriend, highly reminiscent of the sensationalized trial in Werner Schroeter's Palermo or Wolfsburg. This performance mawkishly prompts them to reconvene with their former students at Constance's theater and rehearse a play. The rehearsal seems to be the first time the students have worked together on a play. Despite their talent, they struggle to finish even a single scene. They realize that they are unable to act without Constance's relentless criticism, not knowing if she'll ever return.

== Reception ==
Gang of Four has a 100% approval rating on Rotten Tomatoes based on the views of seven critics.

Nathalie Richard won the inaugural Michel Simon Prize for her performance in the film, in 1989.

== Cast ==
- Bulle Ogier as Constance
- Benoît Régent as Thomas
- Fejria Deliba as Anna/Laura
- Laurence Côte as Claude
- Bernadette Giraud as Joyce
- Inês de Medeiros as Lucia (as Inês d'Almeida)
- Nathalie Richard as Cécile
- Pascale Salkin as Corinne
- Dominique Rousseau as Pauline
- Agnès Sourdillion as Jeanne (as Agnès Sourdillon)
- Irina Dalle as Esther
- Caroline Gasser as Raphaële
- Irène Jacob as Marina
- Albert Dupontel as A (fake) thug
- Florence Lannuzel as Louise
- Françoise Muxel as Valérie
