= Improper Conduct (1984 film) =

- French: Mauvaise Conduite
- Directed by: Néstor Almendros; Orlando Jiménez Leal
- Written by: Nestor Almendros
- Produced by: Barbet Schroeder; Margaret Ménégoz; Michel Thoulouze
- Release date: 1984
- Running time: 112 minutes
- Country: France
- Languages: French, Spanish

Mauvaise Conduite or Improper Conduct is a 1984 documentary film directed by Néstor Almendros and Orlando Jiménez Leal. The documentary interviews Cuban refugees to explore the Cuban government's imprisonment of homosexuals, political dissidents, and Jehovah's Witnesses into forced-labor camps under its policy of Military Units to Aid Production (UMAP). The documentary was produced with the support of French television Antenne 2 and won the Best Documentary Audience Award at the 1984 San Francisco International Lesbian and Gay Film Festival.

== See also ==
- LGBT rights in Cuba
