= Military Units to Aid Production =

Cuban concentration camps in 1965–1968

- Forced labor camps
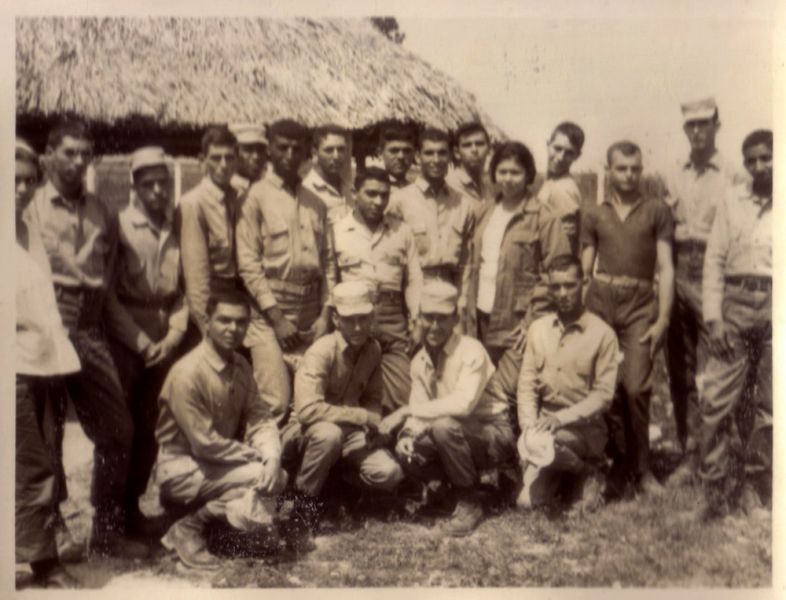
- Homosexuals and dissidents imprisoned in a Military Unit to Aid Production in 1967.
- Known for: Forced labor and torture for ideological opponents and LGBT people
- Location: Camagüey Province, Cuba
- Built by: Republic of Cuba
- Operated by: Cuban Revolutionary Armed Forces
- Original use: Penal labor, concentration camps
- Operational: November 1965 - July 1968
- Inmates: Conscientious objectors, dissidents, democrats, LGBT people, Christians
- Number of inmates: 30,000 - 35,000; At least 507 institutionalized after being psychologically tortured
- Killed: At least 252
- Notable inmates: Jaime Lucas Ortega y Alamino; Pablo Milanés; Héctor Santiago
- Notable books: Before Night Falls

Military Units to Aid Production or UMAPs (Unidades Militares de Ayuda a la Producción) were agricultural forced labor concentration camps operated by the Cuban government from November 1965 to July 1968 in the Province of Camagüey. The UMAP camps served as a form of forced labor for Cubans who could not serve in the military due to being conscientious objectors, Christians and other religious people, LGBT, or political enemies of Fidel Castro or his communist revolution. The language used in the title can be misleading, as pointed out by historian Abel Sierra Madero, "The hybrid structure of work camps' military units served to camouflage the true objectives of the recruitment effort and to distance the UMAPs from the legacy of forced labor."

Many of the inmates were gay men, Jehovah's Witnesses, Seventh-day Adventists, Catholic priests, Protestant ministers, intellectuals, farmers who resisted collectivization, and anyone else who was considered "anti-social" or "counter-revolutionary." Former Intelligence Directorate agent Norberto Fuentes estimated that of approximately 35,000 internees, 507 ended up in psychiatric wards, 72 died from torture, and 180 committed suicide. A 1967 human rights report from the Organization of American States found that over 30,000 internees were "forced to work for free in state farms from 10 to 12 hours a day, from sunrise to sunset, seven days per week, poor alimentation with rice and spoiled food, unhealthy water, unclean plates, congested barracks, no electricity, latrines, no showers, inmates are given the same treatment as political prisoners." The report concludes that the UMAP camps’ two objectives were "facilitating free labor for the state" and "punishing young people who refuse to join communist organizations." The Cuban government maintained that the UMAPs were not labor camps, but part of military service.

In a 2010 interview with La Jornada, Fidel Castro admitted in response to a question about the UMAP camps, "Yes, there were moments of great injustice, great injustice!" Historically, the Cuban government has presented the camps as a mistake, but according to Abel Sierra Madero, the institution must be understood as part of a project of "social engineering" tailored for political and social control. Sophisticated methodologies were deployed that incorporated judicial, military, educational, medical, and psychiatric apparatuses."

== History ==
=== Background ===
Since 1960, labor in Cuba was beginning to fall more under state supervision. In 1960, the Guanahacabibes camp was constructed by Che Guevara. In 1963, Cuba ordered all males from ages 18-45 to be drafted. This draft divided draftees into those doing physical labor, and those in the official armed forces. Eventually the Military Units to Aid Production would be developed out of this draft, as a place for "anti-socials" who were subject to the draft.

=== Creation ===
The creation of the UMAP camps themselves was initially proposed by Fidel Castro and implemented by his brother Raúl Castro after a state visit to the Soviet Union and Bulgaria, where he learned that the Soviets ran camps for "anti-socials." According to an April 14, 1966 article in Granma, the official state newspaper, UMAP camps were proposed at a November 1965 meeting between Fidel Castro and military leaders. Both were concerned over how to handle "misplaced elements."

"Quedaba por ver el caso de una serie de elementos desubicados, vagos, que ni trabajaban, ni estudiaban. ¿Qué hacer con ellos? La cuestión era tema de preocupación para los dirigentes de la Revolución. Un día del mes de noviembre del pasado año (1965) un grupo de oficiales se encontraban reunidos en el Estado Mayor General y discutían estas cuestiones. Hablaban con Fidel, el cual compartía esas mismas preocupaciones y le propusieron la creación de la UMAP."

"Still left to consider was the case of misplaced elements, deadbeats, those who neither studied nor worked. What can be done with these people? This question was the worrying concern for the leaders of the Revolution. One day in November of last year, 1965, a group of military officials met to discuss these questions. They spoke with Fidel, who shared these concerns and proposed to him the creation of the UMAP."

The UMAP was used as a tool to allow Cuba to mimic the revolutionary changes brought about in the Soviet Union in which many in the government wanted to craft its citizens into an "obedient" labor force.

== Operations ==
=== Internment of citizens ===
The main recogidas ("roundups") of UMAP internees occurred in June and November 1965. Another large recogida occurred after an airplane engineer for Cubana Airlines attempted to hijack an airplane in March 1966, which resulted in the firing of many airline employees and their sentencing to UMAP camps even if they had no connection to the attempt.

One of the most common ways to take individuals to UMAP camps was for a false notice to appear for military service, which had become obligatory since the establishment of the draft on November 12, 1963 by Law No. 1129. Individuals would receive a telegram with a notice to appear at a given location for SMO ("Servicio Militar Obligatorio," Obligatory Military Service). Instead of being taken to an actual military camp to receive training for the army, they would be transported by train, truck, or bus to agricultural UMAP labor camps which were located in Camagüey, a former province on the eastern end of the island. Conditions on the up to eight-hour trip across the island were poor, with internees provided with little clean water, food, or facilities.

Many interviewees in the documentary Improper Conduct report that the police rounded up people directly off the streets into buses to be taken to UMAP camps. That method of selection appears to have been more common for effeminate gay men and "anti-socials" such as "hippies."

=== Activities inside the camps ===
UMAP camps typically held 120 internees, split up into squads of ten. The camps typically consisted of three barracks: two for internees and one for military personnel. The camps had no running water or electricity.

Internees at the UMAP camps received no military training and they were not given any arms. Their uniform was blue pants, a denim shirt, and boots. The labor that the internees performed consisted of a variety of agricultural tasks from tearing down the marabou plant to picking fruit, but they mostly engaged in the cutting of sugar cane.

Many of the military personnel who ran the camps were illiterate or semi-illiterate soldiers. The Cuban government assigned those undereducated soldiers to UMAP camps because they were trying to professionalize the Cuban military.

Every squad of ten was led by a cabo ("corporal") who was one of the inmates. The cabo was in charge of tasks such as showing their squad where to work, but he still wore the same uniform as the other internees and had to perform agricultural labor.

Each camp also had an accountant, who was chosen from among the inmates. The accountant was in charge of keeping track of the amount of work each internee completed.

Finally, each camp had a suministro, also an internee, who was in charge of bringing food rations from a central military barrack back to his or her respective UMAP camp, where the suministro would distribute food amongst fellow internees. The suministro had to be careful in allocating the food among the internees, or they would run out of food before the end of the month. Former suministros from UMAP camps report that military officials did not provide enough food so that they could take the remaining foodstuffs back home or sell them to people in the countryside (guajiros).

The camps were divided by category into camps for gay men and camps for everyone else. The internees were often divided by category (Jehovah’s Witnesses, gay men, Catholics, etc.) en route to and at the camps. There, homosexuals and effeminate men would often be selected from one camp to another that was especially for homosexuals.

There are many reports of physical abuse inside the camps, especially reports of physical abuse of Jehovah’s Witnesses. Among the many forms of abuse, former internees report that Jehovah’s Witnesses were beaten, they were threatened with execution, dirt was stuffed in their mouths, they were buried in the ground up to their necks, they were tied up naked outside with barbed wire and they were not given any food or water until they fainted. Emilio Bejel, the author of Gay Cuban Nation, wrote that some of the officials who ran the camps were executed because of how badly they mistreated the inmates. Nevertheless, the state-run Granma newspaper reported:

"When the first groups, which were nothing good, began to arrive, some officers did not have either the necessary patience or the required experience and lost their temper. For these reasons, some officers were submitted to a court-martial. In some cases they were demoted and, in other ones [cases] they were expelled from the Armed Forces (Granma, April 14, 1966).

Some internees mutilated themselves in the hope that they would be transferred from the camps.

=== Third-party testimonies ===
Paul Kidd, a Canadian foreign news correspondent, provides the only known first-hand third-party account of the UMAP camps. Kidd traveled to Cuba on August 29, 1966 to write for Southam News Service. On September 8, the Cuban Foreign Ministry asked him to leave "by the first flight" because he had taken photographs of anti-aircraft guns visible from his hotel room window and "exhibited an incorrect attitude toward the revolution" in an article that he had published.

During the trip, Kidd departed Havana and wandered through the rural former Province of Camaguey where he encountered a UMAP labor camp near the hamlet of El Dos de Cespedes. The barbed-wire enclosed camp was run by 10 security guards and held 120 internees, consisting of Jehovah's Witnesses, Roman Catholics, and "those loosely termed 'social misfits' by the government." The ages of the inmates ranged from 16 to over 60. None of the internees were given arms; all weapons at the camp were under the control of the ten guards running the camp. The internees worked an average of 60 hours a week for a monthly income of 7 pesos (roughly worth a meal), and their internment typically lasted for at least six months. Cubans who served in the standard SMO ("Servicio Militar Obligatorio," Obligatory Military Service) received the same monthly wage of 7 pesos a month.

As long as their agricultural quotas were met, most internees at the camp were allowed a break to visit family after six months of internment. Family members were allowed to visit internees at the camp on the second Sunday of each month and could bring personal items such as cigarettes to internees. Internees at the camp Kidd discovered were housed in two long white concrete buildings with no windows and just a hole in the wall, which had bunk beds with sacks slung between wooden beams for mattresses. After they had completed their agricultural work, internees were instructed in communist ideology for two hours every night. Kidd estimated that about 200 such camps existed and in total housed about 30,000 people.

== Legacy ==
The direct effects of the UMAP camps are still felt in Cuba's homosexual and youth communities. Contemporary authors like Lillian Guerra believe the reason for their creation rested on the need for the communist government to put itself directly into the personal lives of its citizens and then to use gender and sexuality to eliminate "ideological diversionism."

== Notable inmates ==
- Cardinal Jaime Ortega, Catholic Archbishop of the Archdiocese of Havana from 1981 to 2016
- Carlos L. Alas, son of Carlos Alas del Casino. Cuban singer and songwriter
- Pablo Milanes, Cuban singer and songwriter
- Félix Luis Viera, Cuban writer currently living in Mexico and author of book about UMAP experiences
- Héctor Santiago, Cuban playwright

== In popular culture ==
- Fresa y Chocolate – 1994 Cuban film which deals with the discrimination LGBT people faced after the Revolution, also brieftly mentions the UMAP camps.
- "El Pecado Original" – song by Pablo Milanes, considered a homage to remember the mistakes made in post-Revolution Cuba towards LGBT people.
- Before Night Falls – autobiography by Reinaldo Arenas, deals with theme of UMAP camps.

== Documentaries and books ==
- Improper Conduct (in Spanish: Conducta impropia) – 1984 documentary by Néstor Almendros and Orlando Jiménez-Leal
  A book published in Spanish as Conducta impropia has the transcriptions of all testimonies appearing in the film and others never used.
- La UMAP: El Gulag Castrista – 2004 book by Enrique Ros
- Un Ciervo Herido (A Wounded Deer) – book by Félix Luis Viera
- UMAP: Una Muerte a Plazos – book by José Caballero
