= Les Films du Losange =

French film production company

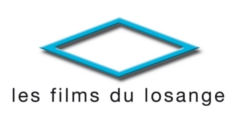
- Type: SARL
- Industry: Films
- Founded: 1962
- Founders: Barbet Schroeder; Éric Rohmer
- Headquarters: Paris, France
- Key people: Charles Gillibert (President)
- Services: Film distribution; Film production; Film sales
- Website: Official website

Les Films du Losange (French pronunciation: [le film dy lɔzɑ̃ʒ], lit. 'Lozenge Films'), also known as Le Losange, is a film production, film distribution and international sales company founded by Barbet Schroeder and Éric Rohmer in 1962.

== History ==
Les Films du Losange was founded by Barbet Schroeder and Éric Rohmer in 1962. The company funded and distributed many films from the French Nouvelle Vague era, directed by Rohmer, Schroeder, Roger Planchon, Jacques Rivette, and later on Michael Haneke and Jacques Doillon.

As of July 2021, Les Films du Losange has been owned by its president Charles Gillibert and managing director Alexis Dantec, who purchased it from longtime manager Margaret Ménégoz.

In January 2022, Les Films du Losange acquired the catalogue of French director Jean Eustache.

In May 2024, Les Films du Losange acquired Raymond Depardon's production company Palmeraie et Desert.

== Partial filmography ==
Year	Title	Director
1959	Le Signe du Lion	Éric Rohmer
1962	La Boulangère de Monceau	Éric Rohmer
1963	La Carrière de Suzanne	Éric Rohmer
1967	La Collectionneuse	Éric Rohmer
1969	Ma nuit chez Maud	Éric Rohmer
1969	More	Barbet Schroeder
1970	Le Genou de Claire	Éric Rohmer
1972	L'Amour l'après-midi	Éric Rohmer
1972	La Vallée	Barbet Schroeder
1974	Céline et Julie vont en bateau	Jacques Rivette
1974	General Idi Amin Dada: A Self Portrait	Barbet Schroeder
1976	La Marquise d'O...	Éric Rohmer
1976	Maîtresse	Barbet Schroeder
1978	Perceval le Gallois	Éric Rohmer
1978	Koko, le gorille qui parle	Barbet Schroeder
1981	La Femme de l'aviateur	Éric Rohmer
1981	Le Pont du Nord	Jacques Rivette
1982	Le Beau Mariage	Éric Rohmer
1982	Lettres d'amour en Somalie	Frédéric Mitterrand
1983	Pauline à la plage	Éric Rohmer
1984	Les Nuits de la pleine lune	Éric Rohmer
1984	Un amour de Swann	Volker Schlöndorff
1984	Cheaters (Tricheurs)	Barbet Schroeder
1986	Le Rayon vert	Éric Rohmer
1987	L'Ami de mon amie	Éric Rohmer
1987	4 Aventures de Reinette et Mirabelle	Éric Rohmer
1989	Noce blanche	Jean-Claude Brisseau
1990	Conte de printemps	Éric Rohmer
1990	Europa Europa	Agnieszka Holland
1992	Conte d'hiver	Éric Rohmer
1996	Conte d'été	Éric Rohmer
1996	Le Bel Été 1914	Christian de Chalonge
1998	Conte d'automne	Éric Rohmer
1998	Lautrec	Roger Planchon
1999	Pan Tadeusz	Andrzej Wajda
2000	La vierge des tueurs	Barbet Schroeder
2000	La saison des hommes	Moufida Tlatli
2005	The Art of Breaking Up	Michel Deville
2005	Caché	Michael Haneke
2008	La fabrique des sentiments	Jean-Marc Moutout
2011	De bon matin	Jean-Marc Moutout
2012	Holy Motors	Leos Carax
2013	Nymphomaniac	Lars von Trier
2014	Clouds of Sils Maria	Olivier Assayas
2020	My Best Part (Garçon chiffon)	Nicolas Maury
2023	The Beast in the Jungle	Patric Chiha
2024	Dahomey	Mati Diop
2024	Misericordia	Alain Guiraudie
2025	Six Days in Spring	Joachim Lafosse
2026	Out of This World	Albert Serra
