= Tricheurs =

Tricheurs or Les Tricheurs may refer to:

- Young Sinners (1958 film), French film directed by Marcel Carné
- Cheaters (1984 film), French film directed by Barbet Schroeder
- The Cheaters (2022 film), Canadian film directed by Louis Godbout
