= Hector Santiago =

Hector Santiago or Héctor Santiago may refer to:

- Hector Santiago (baseball) (born 1987), American professional baseball pitcher
- Héctor Santiago (playwright) (born 1944), Cuban playwright
- Héctor Santiago-Colón (1942-1968), Puerto Rican soldier and medal of Honor recipient
