= Caroline Champetier =

French cinematographer

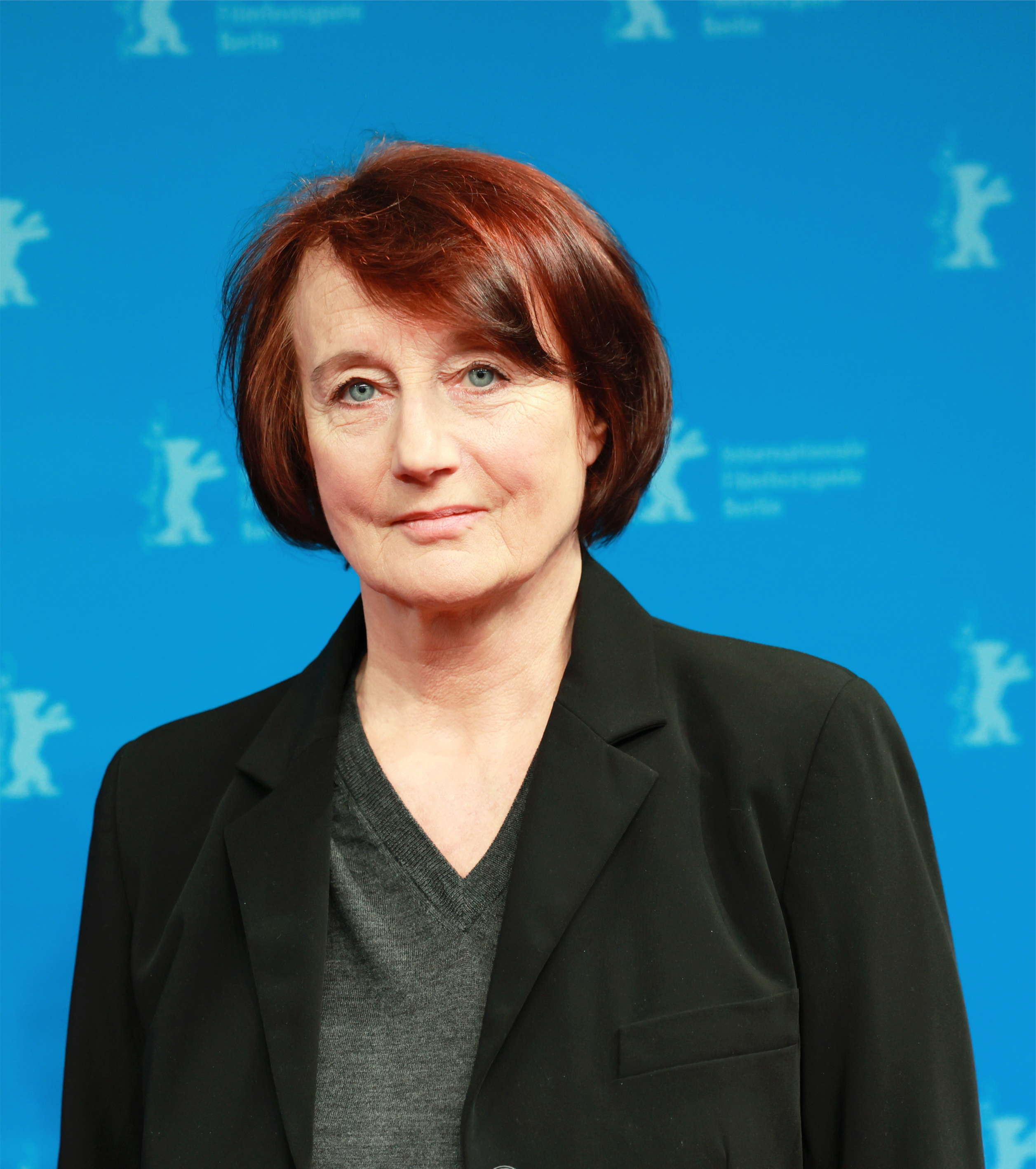
- Caroline Champetier (2023)
- Born: 16 July 1954 (age 72); Paris, France
- Occupation: Cinematographer
- Years active: 1979–present
- Children: Alice de Lencquesaing

Caroline Champetier (born 16 July 1954) is a French cinematographer. She has contributed to more than one hundred films since 1979. She won the César Award for Best Cinematography for her work on Of Gods and Men in 2011.

She was the president of the French Society of Cinematographers (AFC) between 2009 and 2012. In 2023, she was awarded Berlinale Camera award for lifetime achievement at 73rd Berlin International Film Festival.

She won the César Award for Best Cinematography in 2011 for the film Of Gods and Men directed by Xavier Beauvois.

She considers herself the "patron saint" (marraine) of the film magazine La Septième Obsession, to which she regularly gives extensive interviews on filmmaking, including in May 2018 and November 2019.

She was awarded the Berlinale Camera on 23 February 2023 at the 73rd Berlin International Film Festival for her special contribution to cinema.

She has a daughter with Louis-Do de Lencquesaing, Alice de Lencquesaing, who is an actress.

== Selected filmography ==
=== As cinematographer ===
Year	Title	Notes
1981	Le Pont du Nord	
1982	Toute une nuit	
1984	Klassenverhältnisse	
1988	La bande des quatre	
1993	Hélas pour moi	
1993	Les Enfants jouent à la Russie	
1995	A Single Girl	
1996	Ponette	
1999	Lush	
2001	H Story	
2001	That Love	
2005	The Young Lieutenant	
2006	The Untouchable	also actress
2010	Of Gods and Men	César Award for Best Cinematography; Lumière Award for Best Cinematography; Nominated—European Film Award for Best Cinematographer
2011	Sport de filles	
2012	Holy Motors	Nominated—César Award for Best Cinematography
2014	La Rançon de la gloire	
2015	The Art Dealer	
2016	Agnus Dei	Nominated—César Award for Best Cinematography
2016	Looking for Her	
2021	Annette	
2022	The Damned Don’t Cry	
2023	Widow Clicquot	
2024	It's Not Me	

=== As director/screenwriter ===
Year	Title	Notes
1991	Le Sommeil d'Adrien	Writer; Short film
2012	Berthe Morisot	Director; TV movie
