= La Vallée (film) =

1972 film by Barbet Schroeder

- Theatrical release poster
- Directed by: Barbet Schroeder
- Written by: Paul Gégauff; Barbet Schroeder
- Produced by: Mike Kaplan
- Starring: Bulle Ogier; Jean-Pierre Kalfon; Valérie Lagrange; Michael Gothard; Jérôme Beauvarlet; Monique Giraudy
- Cinematography: Néstor Almendros
- Edited by: Denise de Casabianca
- Music by: Pink Floyd
- Production companies: Les Films du Losange; Société nouvelle de cinématographie
- Distributed by: Imperia Films
- Release date: 11 July 1972
- Running time: 100 minutes
- Country: France
- Language: French

La Vallée, also known as Obscured by Clouds, is a 1972 French film written and directed by Barbet Schroeder. The film stars Bulle Ogier as Viviane, a woman who goes on a strange and accidental voyage of self-discovery through the New Guinea bush.

Pink Floyd recorded an album, Obscured by Clouds, as the soundtrack to the film. After recording had finished, the band fell out with the film company, prompting them to release the soundtrack album as Obscured by Clouds, rather than La Vallée. In response, the film was retitled La Vallée (Obscured by Clouds) on its release.

The actress credit "Monique Giraudy" is actually an alias of Miquette Giraudy, at the time a film editor and, later on, vocalist and synthesizer player with the progressive rock/space rock band Gong with her partner Steve Hillage; they later formed the electronic group System 7.

== Plot ==
Viviane (Ogier), the wife of the French consul in Melbourne, joins a group of explorers in search of a mysterious hidden valley in the bush of New Guinea, where she hopes to find the feathers of an extremely rare exotic bird. Along the way through the dense jungles of Papua New Guinea and on the peak of Mount Giluwe, she and the small group of explorers make contact with a native tribe called the "Mapuga", portrayed as one of the most isolated groups of human beings on earth, who inspire them to explore their own humanity, unfettered by their own subjective ideas of "civilization". The search becomes a search for a paradise said to exist within a valley marked as "obscured by cloud" on the only map of the area available dated as surveyed in 1969.

== Cast ==
- Bulle Ogier as Viviane
- Jean-Pierre Kalfon as Gaëtan
- Valérie Lagrange as Hermine
- Michael Gothard as Olivier
- Jérôme Beauvarlet as Yann
- Miquette Giraudy (credited as Monique Giraudy) as Monique
- Thomas Binns Associate Producer and actor (as foul mouthed Australian)
- The Mapuga tribe and its Chiefs
