= Bruno Barbey =

Moroccan-born French photographer (1941–2020)

Bruno Barbey (13 February 1941 – 9 November 2020) was a Moroccan-born French photographer. Throughout his four-decade career, he travelled across five continents, photographing many wars.

== Life and work ==
Barbey was born in Morocco. His father was a diplomat. In 1959/1960 studied photography and graphic arts at the Ecole des Arts et Métiers in Vevey, Switzerland. During the 1960s he was commissioned to photograph European and African countries by Editions Rencontre in Lausanne. In 1964, Barbey began a relationship with Magnum Photos, becoming an Associate member in 1966, and a full member in 1968, at which time he was photographing student riots in Paris. He eventually served as Magnum vice president for Europe in 1978 and 1979 and from 1992 to 1995 as President of Magnum International.

He spent 1979 to 1981 photographing Poland, resulting in his book Poland. He rejected the label of 'war photographer', although he became renowned for photographing conflicts as well as unusual, beautiful images. He covered civil wars in Nigeria, Vietnam, the Middle East, Cambodia, Northern Ireland, Iraq, Kuwait and the liberation war in Bangladesh. From 2005 Barbey pursued, among other work, a project on Istanbul.

== Death ==
Barbey died on 9 November 2020 at the age of 79 in Orbais l’Abbaye, France.

== Awards ==
- French National Order of Merit
- Overseas Press Club Award
- Photojournalism Award, University of Missouri

== Publications ==
=== Publications by Barbey ===
- Naples. Switzerland: Rencontre, 1964.
- Camargue. Switzerland: Rencontre, 1964.
- Portugal. Switzerland: Rencontre, 1966.
- Kenya. Switzerland: Rencontre, 1966.
- Koweït. Switzerland: Rencontre, 1967.
- Ecosse. Switzerland: Rencontre, 1968.
- Ceylan. France: André Barret, 1974.
- Iran. Jeune Afrique, 1976.
- Nigeria. France: Jeune Afrique, 1978.
- Bombay. Netherlands: Time & Life, 1979.
- Pologne. France: Arthaud, 1982.
- Le Gabon. France: Chêne, 1984.
- Portugal. Germany: Hoffmann & Campe, 1988.
- Fès, immobile, immortelle. France: Imprimerie Nationale, 1996.
- Gens des nuages. France: Stock, 1997.
- Mai 68. France: Différence, 1998.
- Photo Poche. France: Nathan, 1999.
- Essaouira. France: Chêne, 2000.
- Les Italiens. France: Martinière, 2002.
- Maroc. France: Martinière, 2003.
- 1968, Bruno Barbey. Istanbul, Turkey: Fotografevi, 2008.
- Italyanlar / Italians. Turkey: Yapi Kredi, 2008.
- Bruno Barbey's Istanbul. Turkey: Yapi Kredi, 2009.
- Passages. Paris: La Martinière, 2015. ISBN 978-2732455723. Bilingual in English and French.

=== Publications with contributions by Barbey ===
- Magnum Contact Sheets. Edited by Kristen Lubben.
  - Magnum Contact Sheets. London: Thames & Hudson, 2011. ISBN 9780500544129.
  - Magnum Contact Sheets. London: Thames & Hudson, 2014. ISBN 978-0500544310. Compact edition.
  - Magnum Contact Sheets: The Collector's Edition: Bruno Barbey, Paris Riots, 1968. London: Thames & Hudson, 2011. ISBN 978-0500544129.

== Films ==
- The Bakery Girl of Monceau (1963) – directed by Éric Rohmer, cinematography by Barbey
- Mai 68 (1968) – 16 mm, B&W
- 3 Jours, 3 Photographes (1979) – directed by F. Moscovitz; about Barbey, Jean Loup Sieff and Robert Doisneau
- Assignment in Morocco (1988) – BBC, directed by Clem Vallance; in conjunction with centenary of National Geographic
- Maroc sans Frontière (1996) – directed by Mostafa Bouazzaoui for Moroccan television
- Les Italiens (2002) – directed by Caroline Thiénot; betanum, 10 mins
- Panoramiques Maroc (2003) – Caroline Thiénot; betanum, 12 mins
- Grand Angle (2005) – 2M, Maroc
- Mai 68 vu par Bruno Barbey (2008) – Caroline Thienot

== Collections ==
Barbey's work is held in the following collection:

- Magnum Photos: Photographic Collection at the Harry Ransom Center, University of Texas at Austin
