= Six in Paris =

1965 anthology film

- Theatrical release poster
- French: Paris vu par...
- Directed by: Éric Rohmer; Jean-Luc Godard; Jean Douchet; Claude Chabrol; Jean-Daniel Pollet; Jean Rouch
- Written by: Éric Rohmer; Jean-Luc Godard; Jean Douchet; Claude Chabrol; Jean-Daniel Pollet; Jean Rouch; Georges Keller
- Produced by: Barbet Schroeder
- Cinematography: Jean Rabier; Étienne Becker
- Production companies: Les Films du Cyprès; Les Films du Losange
- Distributed by: Les Films du Losange
- Release date: 19 May 1965 (France)
- Running time: 95 minutes
- Country: France
- Language: French

Six in Paris (French: Paris vu par..., lit. 'Paris Seen By...') is a 1965 French comedy-drama anthology film.

== Cast and segments ==
"Saint-Germain-des-Prés" Directed by Jean Douchet

- Jean-Pierre Andréani as Raymond
- Jean-François Chappey as Jean
- Barbara Wilkin as Katherine

Segment about an American girl student taken in by a French playboy and gets wise to another's ways. Director Douchet was at the time, like Eric Rohmer, a freshly resigned critic from Cahiers du Cinéma best known later for book on Hitchcock.

"Gare du Nord" Directed by Jean Rouch

- Nadine Ballot as Odile
- Gilles Quéant as Stranger
- Barbet Schroeder as Jean-Pierre

Segment shows the influence of documentary and 16 mm by Rouch. Also notably uses almost one long hand-held continuous take, following Odile from a breakfast table argument with her boyfriend (played by producer/director Barbet Schroeder in an early role), whom she is bored and irritated by into the street where she meets a mysterious man. The man seems to be the answer to all her complaints and wants her to go away with him but for otherwise saying he will kill himself if she does not.

"Rue Saint-Denis" Directed by Jean-Daniel Pollet

- Micheline Dax as Prostitute
- Claude Melki as Leon

Format again inflects form in Jean Daniel Pollet's segment with comedy as real-world stage actress Michelline Dax plays the worldly Parisian prostitute broadly as she kindheartedly makes fun of her inexperienced customer. Melki, like a few New Wave actors, riffs on Buster Keaton in nod to a tradition of shorts being comedies in the role.

"Place de l'Etoile" Directed by Eric Rohmer

- Marcel Gallon as Victim
- Jean-Michel Rouzière as Jean-Marc
- Georges Bez
- Jean Douchet as A client
- Sarah Georges-Picot
- Maya Josse as Woman in the metro
- Philippe Sollers as A client

Some would later identify this as uncharacteristically Rohmer neglecting his writing on silent comedy. The short plays upon the confusion around the Arc de Triomphe in Paris embodied by the character Jean-Marc as deftly shot by Nestor Almendros. In going to and from work the character mistakenly believes that he has killed a man in a rude encounter and tries to dodge location and responsibility.

"Montparnasse-Levallois" Directed by Jean-Luc Godard

- Serge Davri as Ivan
- Philippe Hiquilly as Roger
- Joanna Shimkus as Monica

Segment interprets the news story that Alfred Lubitsch (Jean-Paul Belmondo) reads to Angela (Anna Karina) in a restaurant in A Woman Is a Woman (1961). Itself based on the Jean Giraudoux story "La Méprise" with the genders reversed in the film where two women receive the letters mistakenly sent by their lover to the wrong person. Shot by American documentarian Albert Maysles, showing the woman's plight, Monica, to retrieve and amend the letters she sent.

"La Muette" Directed by Claude Chabrol

- Stéphane Audran as The mother
- Claude Chabrol as The father
- Gilles Chusseau as Boy
- Dany Saril as The maid

Known for his Hitchcockian 'horror-beneath-the-bourgeois-surface' exposed on film, director Claude Chabrol himself plays the 'bourgeois' father here with his then-wife Stephane Audran as the mother of a mischievous boy who starts putting ear-plugs in his ears to keep from hearing their constant arguments playfully exploiting the critical-laden term diegesis.
