= Guanahacabibes camp =

Cuban labor camp

The Guanahacabibes camp, was a labor camp in the Guanahacabibes Peninsula of Cuba, established in 1960 by Che Guevara. The characterizing of the camp has been a point of controversy among historians. This controversy is mainly due to the scant official documentation of the camp, because the facility was extra-legal, as well as the variety of personal accounts used retroactively to describe the camp. There is general agreement that it was a sort of labor camp, but some historians stress the voluntary nature of the labor, while others refer to the camp as a sort of "concentration camp" that served as a model for later repressions in Cuba.

== History ==
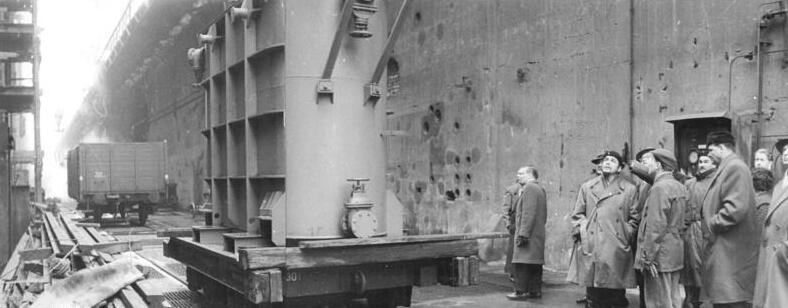
Che Guevara (left most in crowd), observing a workplace in East Germany during his diplomatic tour.

Throughout 1960, Che Guevara traveled the world on a diplomatic mission for Cuba. Upon visiting China, Guevara was impressed with the work brigades used to mobilize civilians for mass work projects. After returning to Cuba, Guevara was named head of the Ministry of Industries. In this position, Guevara ordered the construction of the Guanahacabibes camp.

The camp was intended to be an extra-legal facility, officially titled the "Uvero Quemado Rehabilitation Center". It was intended to be a facility for Che's employees in his ministry. If an employee made some sort of infraction, they could decide to work at Guanahacabibes in return for employment amnesty. If the employee did not want to go to Guanahacabibes, they'd be fired for their infraction.

Soon after the construction of the camp, the facility became the pinnacle of rumor in Cuba. In 1962, during a correspondence between Guevara and a workplace manager, regarding punishments for workers, Guevara stated:

Guanahacabibes is not a feudal penalty. People are not sent to Guanahacabibes who should be in jail. People are sent to Guanahacabibes who have committed a more or less serious breach of revolutionary ethics and have been dismissed from their jobs. They work hard there, but its not brutal.

In 1963, a former inmate at the camp told the Inter-American Commission on Human Rights, that any Cuban who was denounced by a law enforcement official, for whatever reason, could be sentenced to Guanahacabibes. In 1964, the official magazine for the Federation of Cuban Women, claimed local "chulos" were sent to Guanahacibes. These accounts have led historian Rachel Hyson, to posit that there were perhaps multiple labor camps that were commonly called "Guanahacabibes".

== Legacy ==
While conflicting accounts and scant documentation has made characterizing the camp difficult, some historians have utilized the camp in presenting a history of labor repression in Cuba. Soon after the establishment of the Guanahacabibes camp, Cuba legalized in 1962, the dismissal of poor employees to meager workplaces, and in 1963, began to give out harsher jail sentences for workplace theft.

Historians like Julie Marie Bunck even contextualize the creation of Guanahacabibes camp, as the beginning of labor laws that later culminated in the creation of UMAP camps. In 1963, Cuba ordered a military draft for all males ages 18-45. Drafted males were divided between those who'd work in the armed forces, and those who'd commit to manual labor. In 1965, Cuba ordered its most "deviant" draftees to be sent to Military Units to Aid Production (UMAP camps), which were agricultural centers notorious for inhumane treatment.
