= Maîtresse =

1975 film by Barbet Schroeder

- Theatrical release poster
- Directed by: Barbet Schroeder
- Written by: Barbet Schroeder; Paul Voujargol
- Produced by: Pierre Andrieux
- Starring: Bulle Ogier; Gérard Depardieu; André Rouyer; Holger Löwenadler
- Cinematography: Néstor Almendros
- Edited by: Denise de Casabianca
- Music by: Carlos d'Alessio
- Production companies: Les Films du Losange; Gaumont
- Distributed by: Gaumont Distribution
- Release date: 28 April 1975
- Running time: 112 minutes
- Country: France
- Language: French

Maîtresse ([mɛːtʁɛs], 'mistress' or 'teacher') is a 1975 French erotic drama film co-written and directed by Barbet Schroeder, starring Bulle Ogier and, in one of his earliest leading roles, Gérard Depardieu. The film provoked controversy in the United Kingdom and the United States due to its graphic depictions of BDSM.

== Plot ==
Olivier, a young and uncouth provincial, arrives in Paris and teams up with his friend Mario to sell art books door to door. When they try to sell books to Ariane, an attractive, slightly older woman in her dressing gown, she invites them into her luxury apartment and asks them to fix her overflowing bathtub. Upon learning that the apartment downstairs is empty, Mario persuades a reluctant Olivier to rob the place. That night, the two break into the apartment and find it is the sex dungeon of Ariane, who is a professional dominatrix. After catching the intruders, she asks Olivier to urinate on a client's face. She kisses him and ultimately pays him. Later that night, Olivier takes Ariane to dinner.

Olivier soon becomes Ariane's live-in lover. During a trip to the countryside, Ariane convinces Olivier to visit a friend's château, where he agrees to whip a naked woman with his belt in front of a small group of wealthy friends. Back in Paris, Mario visits Olivier at Ariane's apartment and secretly proposes that they rob her, but Olivier angrily throws Mario out. While tending to clients in her dungeon, Ariane suddenly suffers a panic attack and rushes upstairs, where Olivier calms her down as she declares that she can no longer give her clients what they want. As Ariane prepares to return to the dungeon shortly afterwards, Olivier lashes out at her and they slap each other in the face, but ultimately make amends.

One day, Ariane gives Olivier a wad of cash and asks him to open a bank account in his name. After doing so, Olivier returns to the apartment while Ariane is not home, so he goes downstairs and finds a masked client in a cage. Olivier removes the man's mask and demands that he reveal the things Ariane does to him. When the man insists that he only does what Ariane tells him to, Olivier assaults him before apologizing and leaving. Shortly afterwards, Olivier answers a phone call from a mysterious man named Gautier, who is Ariane's wealthy sponsor and protector.

Olivier becomes increasingly jealous of Gautier, with whom Ariane has a secret arrangement that allows her to run her own business as a dominatrix. Since Ariane refuses to talk about Gautier, Olivier barges into Gautier's office and orders him to leave her alone. Thinking that Gautier is Ariane's pimp, Olivier demands 10,000 francs and announces he will now be the one to take care of her. Back at the apartment, Olivier tells Ariane that he met Gautier and gives her the 10,000 francs. Upset with Olivier's betrayal, Ariane ends their relationship and throws him out.

Some time later, Olivier returns to Ariane's apartment, only to find that she has left. He tracks her down to a country house, where she is accompanied by Gautier and her young son. Olivier drops an envelope containing the 10,000 francs into the mailbox and rides off on his motorcycle. Ariane chases after him in her car, and they drive through the woods while having sex behind the wheel. A car accident ensues, but both survive and emerge laughing from the smoking wreckage.

== Cast ==
- Gérard Depardieu as Olivier
- Bulle Ogier as Ariane
- André Rouyer as Mario
- Nathalie Keryan as Lucienne
- Roland Bertin as man in cage
- Tony Taffin as Emile
- Holger Löwenadler as Gautier
- Jeanne Herviale as the concierge

== Release in the United Kingdom ==
Maîtresse was first submitted to the British Board of Film Classification (BBFC) in 1976. Examiners' reports agreed that the film was well made and not exploitative, but under their censorship standards of the time it had to be refused a certificate: "the actual scenes of fetishism are miles in excess of anything we have ever passed in this field". This meant that it could not be shown in a public cinema and instead was given showings in private cinema clubs. However, in 1980, the film was subsequently re-examined for public release by the BBFC, and in February 1981 was granted an 'X' certificate in a cut version. To gain the certificate, a total of 4 minutes and 47 seconds' footage was removed from three scenes, most notably the scene in which Ariane nails a client's scrotum to a plank of wood, an act that was not simulated (and was not performed onscreen by Bulle Ogier). In 2003, the film was submitted for a third time, and was passed for an 18 certificate with all previous cuts waived.

In November 2012, Maîtresse was released in a new Blu-ray Disc/DVD dual-format edition by the BFI, its first appearance on Blu-ray Disc.

The film was rated X in the United States. It was rated R18 in New Zealand for sexual violence, sex scenes and offensive language.

== See also ==
- BDSM in culture and media
- Sadism and masochism in fiction
