= The Bakery Girl of Monceau =

- DVD cover
- Directed by: Éric Rohmer
- Written by: Éric Rohmer
- Produced by: Barbet Schroeder; Georges Derocles (uncredited)
- Starring: Barbet Schroeder; Claudine Soubrier; Michèle Girardon
- Narrated by: Bertrand Tavernier (uncredited)
- Cinematography: Jean-Michel Meurice; Bruno Barbey
- Edited by: Éric Rohmer (uncredited); Jackie Raynal (uncredited)
- Release date: 1962
- Running time: 23 minutes
- Language: French

The Bakery Girl of Monceau (French: La Boulangère de Monceau) is a 1962 short film written and directed by Éric Rohmer. It was the first of Rohmer's Six Moral Tales (Contes moraux), which consisted of two shorts and four feature films.

== Plot ==
A law student is smitten with a young woman he has noticed around his neighbourhood of Monceau, in the 8th arrondisement of Paris, but he does not know how to talk to her. Aided by his friend, Schmidt, he arranges to literally bump into the woman, Sylvie, one day, which finally breaks the ice, but then he does not see her again.

Deciding to start skipping dinner and, instead, spend that time walking around the area looking for Sylvie, the man gets in the habit of picking up a quick snack from a bakery he passes on his route. The cookies and pastries are nothing special, but he develops a flirtation with Jacqueline, the young woman who works in the bakery.

After a few weeks, the man convinces Jacqueline to go on a date with him, though he tells himself that she is the one who pursued him. On his way to pick her up for the date, however, he runs into Sylvie, who has been stuck at home with a badly-sprained ankle, and he immediately drops Jacqueline for her. It turns out that Sylvie lives right across from the bakery, and at dinner she tells the man that, while she was convalescing, she noticed him stuffing his face with sweets every day (it is left ambiguous whether she also noticed his pursuit of the bakery girl).

The man and Sylvie get married six months later. They initially live in her apartment near the bakery, though by that time Jacqueline has moved on to another job, so the man never discovers if she saw him ditch her for Sylvie.

== Cast ==
- Barbet Schroeder as a young law student (voiced by Bertrand Tavernier)
- Claudine Soubrier as Jacqueline, the cashier at a bakery
- Michèle Girardon as Sylvie
- Fred Junk as Schmidt, the law student's friend (uncredited)
- Michel Mardore as a man in line in front of the law student at the bakery (uncredited)

== Narrative structure ==
The general narrative structure of The Bakery Girl of Monceau is repeated in each of Rohmer's five subsequent Moral Tales: the main character (a man), is committed to a woman, meets and is tempted by a second woman, and renounces her for the first woman.

== Meaning of "moral" ==
According to Rohmer:

My intention was not to film raw events, but the narrative that someone makes of them. The story, the choice of facts, their organization...not the treatment that I could have made them submit to. One of the reasons that these tales are called "moral" is that physical actions are almost completely absent: everything happens in the head of the narrator.

Most of the running time of The Bakery Girl consists of narration. While the main character is portrayed onscreen by Barbet Schroeder, he was dubbed by Bertrand Tavernier, whose voice Rohmer judged more appropriate for the very literary voice-over.

Using the word "moral" does not mean that there is a moral in the story. According to Rohmer:

So "contes moraux" doesn't really mean that there's a moral contained in them, even though there might be one and all the characters in these films act according to certain moral ideas that are fairly clearly worked out.

Also, Rohmer said:

They are films in which a particular feeling is analyzed and where even the characters themselves analyze their feelings and are very introspective. That's what "contes Moraux" means.

== Themes ==
- Class – Like in Rohmer's next project, Suzanne's Career, this film features a bourgeois main character who seduces a working-class girl for his own amusement.
- Subjectivity – The film is overtly subjective, dwelling on the protagonist's internal monologue while the camera follows him on his walks around Monceau. However, whether this subjectivity is a deliberate artistic choice or an accidental unearthing of elements of Rohmer's character is a subject of debate. Genevieve Sellier argues that Rohmer sees women as "infinitely interesting and provocative ‘others’", which flows through to his filmmaking. According to Ginette Vincendeau, Rohmer "adopts the modernist posture of the new-wave filmmaker as an ’entomologist,’ observing his wicked human specimen from an ironic, quasi-scientific distance." On the other hand, Molly Haskell argues Rohmer's treatment of women is more complex than this, and can be viewed as making fun of the ways in which men use women for their own ends.
- Love, desire, and free will – This is marked by the conflict within the protagonists, that is, the internalised debate brought on by the pursuit of a second romantic partner. Rohmer "prefer[s] to emphasize the possibility of choice rather than the activity of it". According to James Monaco, there is an "inborn suffering" for the protagonist caused by "excessive meditation upon the beauty of the opposite sex". It is a "love based in idleness".
- Chance and coincidence – A recurring theme in many of Rohmer's films is the critical role of chance encounters in shaping the events of the film. The narrator happens to keep encountering the first woman on the street by chance, while both are out doing other things. Yet, when he begins deliberately searching for her, she can no longer be found. Only when he has stopped searching for her (the afternoon before he takes the bakery girl out on a date) does she reappear. The reason for her absence is also explained by chance: she broke her ankle shortly after the first time they spoke.
- Temptation and fidelity – As in some of Rohmer's other works, the protagonist feels a moral duty to remain faithful to the initial object of desire. Yet, he may betray the first woman through the incomplete seduction of a second woman, "who embodies the dangerous prospect of erotic temptation". The resulting dilemma is solved with the help of a chance event that allows the protagonist to frame his final choice as one couched in morality. This also occurs in other films by Rohmer, such as Rendezvous in Paris and A Summer's Tale.

== Settings and sound ==
In each of the Six Moral Tales, Rohmer only filmed during the time and in the place that the film was set. There was no use of sets. This was partly to facilitate the realism with which Rohmer's films are synonymous, and partly due to lack of money. There were also not funds to hire an on-set audio engineer, so this film, like Rohmer's other early works, was shot without sound. A scratch track was used to preserve the dialogue, which was subsequently re-recorded in post-production. Likewise, all background noises were recreated.

The series contains limited non-diegetic music, with music primarily appearing only if it is being played in the background as part of the setting, such as at a party. There is an emphasis on dialogue, and frequent use of voice-over narration. The Bakery Girl contains no music, and the only sound that interrupts the sounds in the background is the voice of the narrator.
