= Jean Douchet =

French film critic

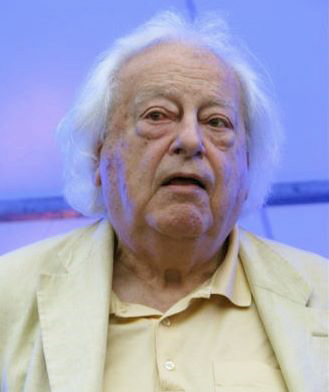
- Douchet in 2010
- Born: 19 January 1929; Arras, Pas-de-Calais, France
- Died: 22 November 2019 (aged 90); Paris
- Occupations: Film critic, teacher, film director
- Years active: 1957–2019

Jean Douchet (French: [ʒɑ̃ duʃɛ]; 19 January 1929 – 22 November 2019) was a French film director, historian, film critic and teacher who began his career in the early 1950s at Gazette du Cinéma and Cahiers du cinéma with members of the future French New Wave.

== Biography ==
As a journalist Douchet wrote extensively about New Wave filmmakers, as well as such directors as Alfred Hitchcock, F. W. Murnau, Kenji Mizoguchi, Vincente Minnelli, Akira Kurosawa, Jean-Luc Godard and Jean-Daniel Pollet. He enabled Serge Daney to begin working for Cahiers. He also acted in small roles for such directors as Godard, Rohmer, François Truffaut, Jean Eustache, Jacques Rivette, Jean Pierre Lefebvre and François Ozon. He taught at the Institut des Hautes Études Cinématographiques and his students included Ozon, Émilie Deleuze and Xavier Beauvois. He was also involved with the Cinémathèque Française and regularly hosts screenings and events. For the Cinémathèque's 2010 tribute to the then recently deceased Éric Rohmer he made the documentary Claude et Éric, an interview with Claude Chabrol about Rohmer's early days at Cahiers du cinéma.

On 22 November 2019 the Cinémathèque Française announced that Jean Douchet had died at age 90.

== Filmography ==
- 1962 Le mannequin de Belleville (short)
- 1965 Dim Dam Dom (TV series)
- 1965 Saint-Germain-des-Prés in Six in Paris (short)
- 1967 Alexandre Astruc, l'ascendant taureau in Cinéastes de notre temps (TV series documentary)
- 1969 1969 Et crac (short)
- 1970 Le dialogue des étudiantes (short)
- 1978 En répétant Perceval in Ciné regards (TV series documentary)
- 1982 Le fantastique in Ciné parade (TV series documentary)
- 1985 Godard plus Godard in Étoiles et toiles (TV series documentary)
- 1987 Mankiewicz in Océaniques – Des idées des hommes des oeuvres (TV series documentary)
- 1994 Eric Rohmer – Preuves à l'appui in Cinéma, de notre temps (TV series documentary)
- 1996 La serva amorosa (feature film)
- 1997 Femmes chez Hitchcock (TV movie documentary)
- 2004 Vanités (video documentary short)
- 2009 À bicyclette (short)
- 2010 Claude et Éric (short)
- 2015 Cher André S. Labarthe (short)

== Books ==
- Alfred Hitchcock (1967); Cahiers du cinéma 1999
- The Art of Love (1987); Small library reissue of Cahiers du cinéma 2003
- Paris cinema: a city view movies from 1895 to the present, with Gilles Nadeau, May 1987
- Modernity film in question, the silent film a talking years, with Rick Altman, The French Cinémathèque 1992
- The Theatre in the cinema, the French Cinémathèque 1993
- New wave, F. Hazan, 2004
- Paulo Rocha, Jean Douchet, Hugues Quester, Alain Bergala, Paulo Branco et al., order. João César Monteiro : against all fires, fire, my fire, now Yellow 2004
- The DVDéothèque Jean Douchet, Small library of Cahiers du Cinéma, 2006
- Jean Douchet, Man movie: interview with Joël Magny, Writing, coll "Essays and Interviews", 2014.
