= Le Pont du Nord =

- Directed by: Jacques Rivette
- Written by: Jacques Rivette
- Produced by: Barbet Schroeder; Martine Marignac; Margaret Ménégoz; Jean-Pierre Mahot
- Starring: Bulle Ogier; Pascale Ogier
- Cinematography: William Lubtchansky; Caroline Champetier; Matthieu Schiffman
- Edited by: Nicole Lubtchansky
- Release dates: 7 October 1981 (NYFF); 13 January 1982 (France)
- Running time: 127 min
- Country: France
- Language: French

Le Pont du Nord is a 1981 French film directed by Jacques Rivette. The film stars Bulle Ogier and her daughter Pascale Ogier. It was released in France on 13 January 1982.

== Plot ==
Marie (Bulle Ogier), a bank robber just out of prison, can no longer bear to live between four walls. Baptiste (Pascale Ogier) says she comes from somewhere else and intends to live by her own rules. (Note that as a French given name Baptiste is masculine, but is here played by an actress.)

Their paths cross three times in a matter of hours. Baptiste believes that it is fate; she must accompany Marie and protect her. Together, they investigate a surreal mystery that includes a briefcase stuffed with obsessive political intrigue, civic redevelopment, a huge mechanical, flame-spewing dragon and several characters all named Max. They invent a dangerous real-life game imagining Paris as a mysterious large scale board on which they play. The plot takes its structure from a French children's game, Game of the Goose (Jeu de l'oie), which overlays a makeshift design on a map of Paris.

== Cast ==
- Bulle Ogier as Marie
- Pascale Ogier as Baptiste
- Pierre Clémenti as Julien
- Jean-François Stévenin as Max
- Benjamin Baltimore as Knife-Wielding Max
- Steve Baës as Mantle-Wearing Max
- Joe Dann as Monte Player
- Mathieu Schiffman as Hungarian
- Antoine Gurevitch as First Boy
- Julien Lidsky as Second Boy
- Marc Truscelli as Third Boy

== Production notes ==
As usual, the story was jointly conceived with Rivette's collaborators, including Bulle Ogier, Pascale Ogier, Suzanne Schiffman and Jérôme Prieur, while the screenplay was written by Rivette. The short film Paris s'en va was made as a rehearsal in preparation for this film.

At least four film posters are seen in the film: The Big Country (1958), La Prisonnière (1968), The Silent Scream (1979), and Kagemusha (1980).
