= Héctor Santiago (playwright) =

American dramatist

- Born: July 25, 1944 (age 81); Havana, Cuba
- Education: University of Havana
- Occupation: Playwright

Héctor Santiago Armenteros Ruiz (born July 25, 1944) is an artist who has been involved in theater in Cuba—before and after the Cuban Revolution—and in the United States.

== Biography ==
Santiago has worked as an actor, playwright, director, choreographer, dancer, and puppeteer. Born in Havana, Cuba, in 1944, he graduated from the Cuban National Dramatist School after studying literature at the University of Havana. In 1959 he cofounded the Children's Theatrical Movement in Cuba. The writer Virgilio Piñera was his literature professor and intimate friend throughout those years.

In 1965 Santiago was accused of antisocial behavior. Five years later he was arrested, and his literary works were seized by the government. He was sentenced to three years' service in UMAP (Military Units to Aid Production), a type of forced labor camp where political dissidents were made to work in inhumane conditions. In 1979 he left Cuba for Spain. Santiago was eventually able to move to New York, where he resides today.

Santiago has been active in promoting HIV awareness in New York City. He has shown a strong desire to portray the social and human impacts of the disease, which was a theme in his plays throughout the 1980s. He once said, "As a human being, I have tried to bring light to these dark times and unflaggingly struggled so that man does not become man's wolf."

Many of his plays have been performed in both Cuba and the United States. His short stories, essays, and plays have been published and translated into English, French, and Catalan. His play Vida y pasión de La Peregrina (Life and Passion of the Pilgrim) was awarded the University of Florida's Golden Letters Award, and its world premiere took place during the International Hispanic Theatre Festival of Miami in 1998.

== Works or publications ==
- El loco juego de las locas. Princeton, NJ: Presbyter's Peartree. 1995. OCLC 43524736.
- El loco juego de las locas y El último vuelo de La Paloma. Miami, FL: Editorial el ateje. 2020. ISBN 9798564871341.
- La memoria del agua. 2012. OCLC 829645359.
- Las noches de la chamblona. Los Angeles: Presbyter's Peartree. 1993. OCLC 31769815.
- Rosalba la lluvia. Princeton, NJ: Presbyter's Peartree. 1995. OCLC 43524771.
- Vida y pasión de La Peregrina. Coral Gables, FL: North-South Center Press, University of Miami. 1997. OCLC 38204420.
- Morir de Isla y Vivir de Exilios. Miami, FL: Editorial el ateje. 2021. ISBN 9798499404928.
