= Bulle Ogier =

French actress and screenwriter (born 1939)

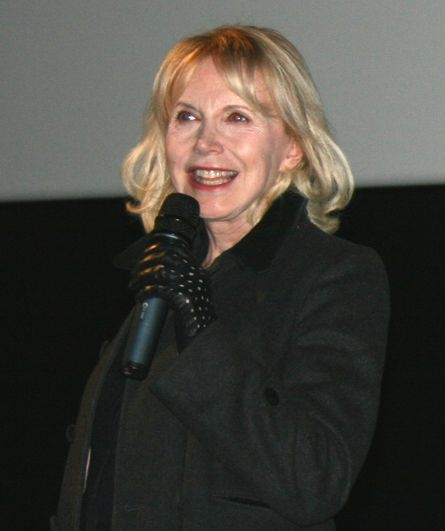
- Ogier in 2008
- Born: Marie-France Thielland; 9 August 1939 (age 87); Boulogne-Billancourt, France
- Occupations: Actress; screenwriter
- Spouse: Barbet Schroeder

Bulle Ogier (born Marie-France Thielland; 9 August 1939) is a French actress and screenwriter.

== Career ==
She adopted the professional surname Ogier, which was her mother's maiden name. Her first appearance on screen was in Voilà l'Ordre, a short film directed by Jacques Baratier with a number of the then-emerging young singers of the 1960s in France, including Boris Vian, Claude Nougaro, etc.

She worked with Jacques Rivette (L'amour fou, Céline et Julie vont en bateau, Duelle, Le Pont du Nord, La Bande des Quatre), Luis Buñuel (Le charme discret de la bourgeoisie), Alain Tanner (La Salamandre), René Allio, Claude Lelouch, Jean-Paul Civeyrac (All the Fine Promises Prix Jean Vigo), Marguerite Duras, Rainer Werner Fassbinder, Barbet Schroeder, and others.

Ogier was awarded the Prix Suzanne Bianchetti in 1972.

== Personal life ==
She had a daughter, Pascale (1958–1984), born of a relationship with the musician Gilles Nicolas, from whom she separated when their daughter was two years old. Pascale adopted her mother's professional surname "Ogier" and was also an actress.

Ogier is married to producer and director Barbet Schroeder.

== Selected filmography ==
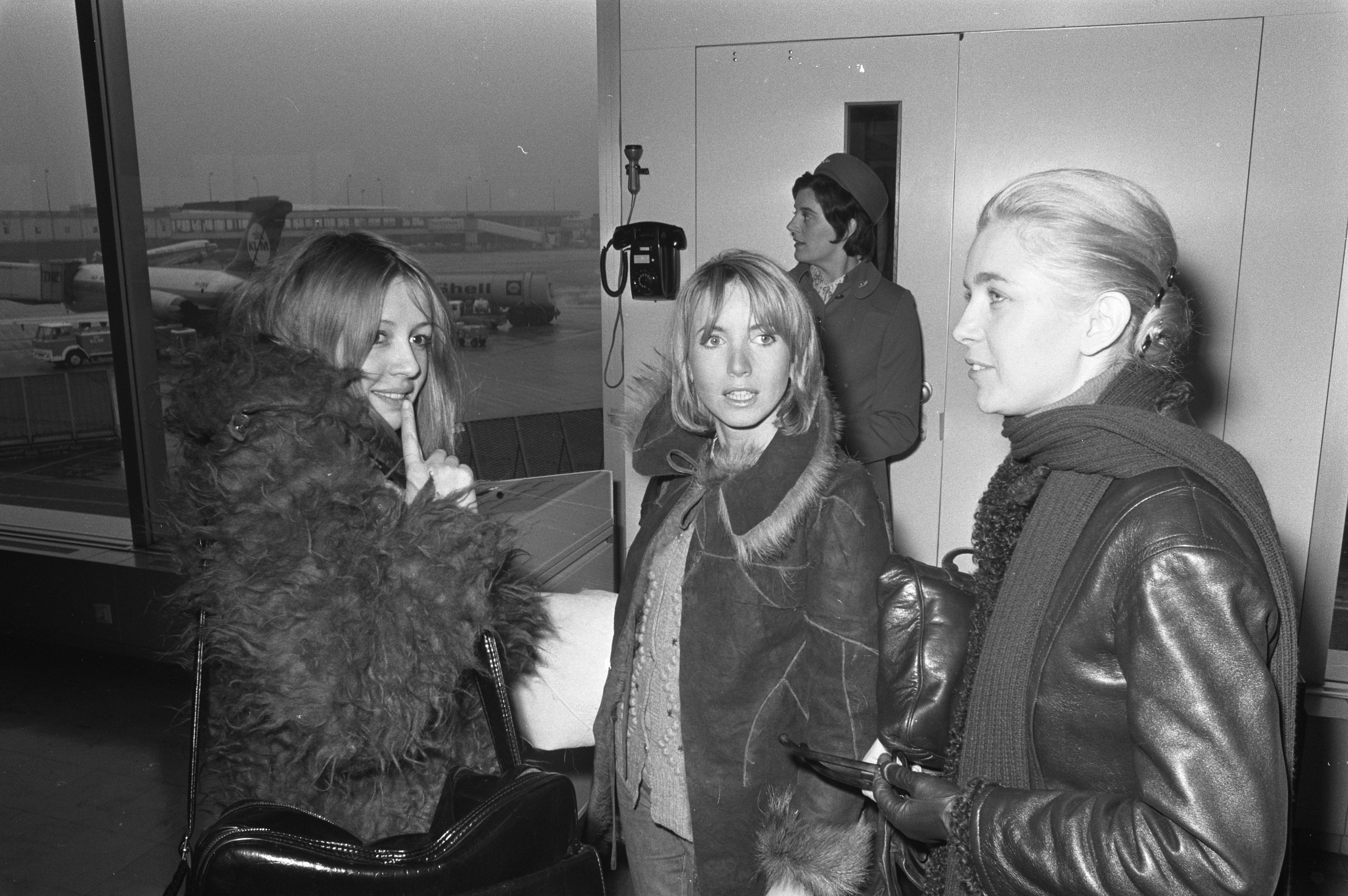
Juliet Berto, Bulle Ogier, and Marie Dubois in 1972

- Lagardère (1967, TV series) – Mariquita
- L'Amour fou (1969, by Jacques Rivette) – Claire
- Paulina Is Leaving (1969, by André Téchiné) - Paulina
- Sophie's Ways (1970, by Moshé Mizrahi)
- Out 1 (1971, by Jacques Rivette) – Pauline/Emilie
- Rendez-vous a Bray (1971, by André Delvaux) – Odile
- The Salamander (1971, by Alain Tanner)
- M comme Mathieu (1971, by Jean-François Adam)
- La Vallée (1972, by Barbet Schroeder) – Vivian
- The Discreet Charm of the Bourgeoisie (1972, by Luis Buñuel)
- Io e lui (1973, by Luciano Salce) – Irene
- The Hostage Gang, (1973, by Édouard Molinaro) – Liliane Guerec Nodier
- La Paloma (1974, by Daniel Schmid) – La mère d'Isidore
- Céline and Julie Go Boating (1974, by Jacques Rivette) – Camille
- A Happy Divorce (1975, by Henning Carlsen) – Marguerite
- Maîtresse (1975, by Barbet Schroeder) – Ariane
- Duelle (1976, by Jacques Rivette) – Viva
- Surreal Estate (1976, by Eduardo de Gregorio) - Ariane
- The Third Generation (1979, by Rainer Werner Fassbinder) – Hilde Krieger
- Le Pont du Nord (1981, by Jacques Rivette) – Marie
- Aspern (1984, by Eduardo de Gregorio) – Mlle Tita
- Cheaters (1984, by Barbet Schroeder) – Suzie
- My Case (1986, by Manoel de Oliveira) – Actrice n° 1
- Candy Mountain (1987, by Robert Frank) – Cornelia
- The Distant Land (1987, by Luc Bondy) – Genia
- Gang of Four (1988, by Jacques Rivette) – Constance
- Don't Forget You're Going to Die (1995, by Xavier Beauvois) – Benoît's mother
- Le Fils de Gascogne (1995, by Pascal Aubier)
- Irma Vep (1995, by Olivier Assayas) – Mireille
- The Color of Lies (1998, by Claude Chabrol) – Yveline Bordier
- Somewhere in the City (1998, by Ramin Niami) – Brigitte
- Venus Beauty Institute (1998, by Tonie Marshall) – Madame Nadine
- Shattered Image (1998, by Raoul Ruiz) – Mrs. Ford
- Stolen Life (1998, by Yves Angelo) – The woman in cemetery
- The Color of Lies (1999, by Claude Chabrol) – Évelyne Bordier
- Confusion of Genders (2000, by Ilan Duran Cohen) – Mère de Laurence
- Deux (2001, by Werner Schroeter) – Anna
- All the Fine Promises (2002, by Jean-Paul Civeyrac) – Béatrice
- Merci Docteur Rey (2002, by Andrew Litvack) – Claude Sabrié
- Seaside (2002, by Julie Lopes-Curval) – Rose
- Good Girl (2005)
- Belle Toujours (2006, by Manoel de Oliveira)
- The Duchess of Langeais (2007, by Jacques Rivette) – Princesse de Blamont-Chauvry
- Let's Dance (Faut que ça danse!) (2007) – Geneviève Bellinsky
- Passe-passe (2008, by Tonie Marshall) – Madeleine
- Wandering Streams (2010) – Lucie
- Chantrapas (2010) – Catherine
- Boomerang (2015, by François Favrat) – Blanche Rey
- Encore heureux (2016, by Benoît Graffin) – Louise
- Capitaine Marleau (2016, by Josée Dayan) – Katel Meyer (1 Episode)
- Wonders in the Suburbs (2019, by Jeanne Balibar) – Delphine Souriceau
- Both Sides of the Blade (2022, by Claire Denis) – Nelly

== Bibliography ==
- J'ai oublié, Paris, Seuil, 2019 ISBN 978-2-02-141722-7

== Honours and distinctions ==
- 1994: Officière of the Ordre des Arts et des Lettres
- 2009: Officière of the Legion of Honour
- 2021: Commandeure of the Ordre national du Mérite
