= General Idi Amin Dada: A Self Portrait =

- Cover of The Criterion Collection DVD release
- Directed by: Barbet Schroeder
- Written by: Barbet Schroeder
- Produced by: Jean-François Chauvel; Charles-Henri Favrod; Jean-Pierre Rassam
- Starring: Idi Amin
- Cinematography: Néstor Almendros
- Edited by: Denise de Casabianca
- Music by: Idi Amin
- Distributed by: Le Figaro Films; Mara Films; TV Recontre
- Release dates: 22 May 1974 (Cannes Film Festival); 5 April 1975 (NYFF); 30 August 1976 (U.S.)
- Running time: 90 minutes
- Countries: France; Switzerland
- Languages: English; French

General Idi Amin Dada: A Self Portrait (French: Général Idi Amin Dada: Autoportrait) is a 1974 documentary film by French director Barbet Schroeder with English dialogue. It was made with the support and participation of its subject, the Ugandan dictator Idi Amin. The film depicts Amin at the height of his power as the ruler of Uganda.

== Synopsis ==
The film is an extended character study of its subject. It follows Amin closely in a series of formal and informal settings, combined with several short interviews in which Amin expounds his unconventional theories of politics, economics, and international relations. Amin is seen supervising the Ugandan paratrooper school, boating through a wildlife park, playing the accordion in a jazz band at a formal dinner, and staging a mock assault on a small hill representing the Golan Heights. He discusses his plans for an attack on Israel, and his letter to Kurt Waldheim, then Secretary General of the United Nations sent in response to the 1972 Munich massacre, which commended Hitler, is touched upon. On TV, it is announced Amin is in possession of a 'manual' which details Israel's plans: The Protocols of the Elders of Zion.

Included in the film are many candid scenes of Amin and his military in action: the paratroopers practise their exercises on a slide similar to those that would be found in a children's playground; a welcoming committee of villagers is forced to flee the dust and backdraft from Amin's helicopter as it lands; a cabinet member picks his nose with the end of a pencil during one of Amin's speeches in a cabinet meeting. In one sequence, Amin upbraids his cabinet ministers for their failure to represent Uganda "correctly" to the world. Even while remonstrating with his foreign minister for his public-relations failures, he is jocular and joking as always — two weeks later, the documentary points out, the foreign minister Michael Ondoga's body was found floating in the River Nile.

== Influence and participation of Idi Amin ==
Director Barbet Schroeder has characterised the film as a "self-portrait" by Amin. While Schroeder and cameraman Nestor Almendros were given unprecedented access to Amin's daily life, the documentary makes it plain that many of the events (including the residents of a garrison town turning out en masse to greet Amin) were staged for their benefit. In several sequences, Amin actively directs the cameraman to particular points of interest, at one point shouting to "film that helicopter!"

However, Amin's influence as a "director" went beyond the actual filming of Idi Amin Dada. As per his agreement with Amin, Barbet Schroeder made two versions of his documentary: the first, an hour-long cut, was released in Uganda and delivered directly to Amin, who was apparently pleased with the result. The second version was released only outside Uganda and contained an additional half-hour of footage and narration.

According to Schroeder, Amin asked Libyan ruler Muammar Gaddafi to send his agents in Britain to watch the film and write down a full transcript of its contents. Amin soon sent a letter to Schroeder requesting additional cuts to the film, but Schroeder refused. In response, Amin rounded up almost 200 French citizens living in Uganda and confined them to a hotel surrounded by the Ugandan army, supplying them with Schroeder's home telephone number and explaining that their release was conditional on Schroeder's acquiescence. In the face of this dilemma, Schroeder made the requested cuts, replacing the 2½ minutes of excised footage with title cards crediting the gaps to Amin. On Amin's fall from power, Schroeder restored the missing material, and most versions seen today contain the full footage.

== Critical reception ==
John Simon called General Idi Amin a "gruesomely fascinating documentary".
