= Cheaters (1984 film) =

- Film poster
- French: Tricheurs
- Directed by: Barbet Schroeder
- Written by: Barbet Schroeder; Pascal Bonitzer; Steve Baes
- Produced by: Margaret Ménégoz
- Starring: Jacques Dutronc; Bulle Ogier
- Cinematography: Robby Müller
- Edited by: Denise de Casabianca
- Music by: Peer Raben
- Production companies: Les Films du Losange; FR3; Bioskop Film
- Distributed by: Les Films du Losange
- Release date: 8 February 1984
- Running time: 94 minutes
- Countries: France; Portugal; Germany
- Language: French

Cheaters (French: Tricheurs) is a 1984 drama film directed by Barbet Schroeder. Starring Jacques Dutronc and Bulle Ogier, it tells the story of two gamblers, a man and a woman, who team up in a casino and eventually realise that, however clever you think you are, you will always lose unless you cheat.

== Plot ==
Elric, who lives in Madeira on his erratic winnings at roulette, is attracted to Suzie, another gambler, but succumbs to the persuasion of Jorg, a third gambler who has a system for cheating. Abandoning Suzie, he embarks on a worldwide tour with Jorg, their method being to move in and after a quick coup to move on fast. In an Italian casino he sees Suzie and the two start a romance.

Abandoning Jorg, the couple go back to Madeira with a system that Elric has devised. A croupier is bribed to use a radio-controlled ball, which Suzie operates from a transmitter in a cigarette packet. The first night they try it, Elric has three huge wins in succession and, losing his head, then loses the lot. Deeply upset at his stupidity, Suzie says she will only continue if she places the bets and he operates the transmitter. After another huge coup, Elric immediately flies to France with a case full of their winnings and Suzie follows later. They meet up at the chateau he has bought, where his father used to be an employee.

== Cast ==
- Jacques Dutronc as Elric
- Bulle Ogier as Suzie
- Kurt Raab as Jorg, the professional cheat
- Virgílio Teixeira as Toni, the corrupt croupier

== Reception ==
In The New York Times Vincent Canby called it "a long overdue treat", "another entertaining, weirdly elegant tale about people moving too fast, living too intensely, along the thin line that separates elation from despair." The Los Angeles Times said it is "an existential love story that also laments the loss of honor and meaning in contemporary life."
