= Full Moon in Paris =

1984 film by Éric Rohmer

- Theatrical release poster
- French: Les nuits de la pleine lune
- Directed by: Éric Rohmer
- Written by: Éric Rohmer
- Produced by: Margaret Ménégoz
- Starring: Pascale Ogier; Tchéky Karyo; Fabrice Luchini; Virginie Thévenet; Christian Vadim; László Szabó
- Cinematography: Renato Berta
- Edited by: Cécile Decugis
- Music by: Elli et Jacno
- Production companies: Les Films du Losange; Les Films Ariane
- Distributed by: Acteurs Auteurs Associés
- Release date: 29 August 1984 (France)
- Running time: 102 minutes
- Country: France
- Language: French

Full Moon in Paris (French: Les nuits de la pleine lune, lit. 'Full Moon Nights') is a 1984 French romantic comedy-drama film written and directed by Éric Rohmer. The film stars Pascale Ogier, Tchéky Karyo and Fabrice Luchini. The score is by Elli et Jacno.

Full Moon in Paris was the fourth instalment in Rohmer's Comedies and Proverbs series. The story opens with the proverb "Qui a deux femmes perd son âme, qui a deux maisons perd la raison" ("He who has two women loses his soul. He who has two houses loses his mind.")

== Synopsis ==
The trainee textile designer Louise lives in Marne-la-Vallée, a suburb some 20 miles from central Paris, with her architect lover Rémi, but also has a small flat as a pied-à-terre in the centre of the city. Feeling confined by their relationship she tells Remi she intends spending more evenings in the flat in solitude, while able to go to parties, which he doesn't like - when her friend Camille holds one, he turns up late, doesn't enjoy himself and leaves early, upsetting Louise. After she's redecorated the flat and moved in, she's surprised to see Rémi in a Paris cafe. Her gossipy journalist friend Octave says he thought he saw Camille there at the same time: Louise is jealous at the thought that they might have got together, though it turns out Camille was in Milan at the time. Octave, who's married, later declares his love for Louise, partly because he's jealous she plans to spend the evening with a sax player, Bastien. She says she only wants Octave as a friend. However, after sleeping with Bastien in the flat, she immediately feels constricted there too, and goes out in the middle of the night to a bar. There, an illustrator explains that it's because of the full moon: it unsettles everyone's emotions. She realises she really wants to be with Rémi and rushes back to Marne next morning - but when he appears, he tells her he's fallen in love, not with Camille but with her flatmate Marianne, and plans to spend his life with her. Louise, shocked that he's taken her at her word when she claimed she was happy with an open relationship, packs and miserably moves out of the house.
