= Pascale Ogier =

Actress (1958–1984)

- Ogier in 1982
- Born: Pascale Marguerite Cécile Claude Colette Nicolas; 26 October 1958; Paris, France
- Died: 25 October 1984 (aged 25); Paris, France
- Resting place: Père Lachaise Cemetery
- Occupation: Actress
- Years active: 1978–1984
- Parent(s): Gilles Nicolas (father); Bulle Ogier (mother)

Pascale Marguerite Cécile Claude Colette Nicolas (26 October 1958 – 25 October 1984), better known as Pascale Ogier, was a French actress. She won the Volpi Cup, and posthumously received a César Award nomination for her role in the 1984 film Full Moon in Paris.

== Biography ==
Ogier was born as Pascale Marguerite Cécile Claude Colette Nicolas in Paris on 26 October 1958. She was the daughter of actress Bulle Ogier and musician Gilles Nicolas. Ogier also chose an acting career, first with appearances on stage. In 1982, she and her mother co-wrote the screenplay and starred in director Jacques Rivette's film Le Pont du Nord.

For her performance in director Éric Rohmer's film Full Moon in Paris, Ogier was nominated for a César Award for Best Actress at the 10th César Awards and won the Volpi Cup for Best Actress at the 41st Venice International Film Festival. Shortly afterwards, on the day before she was to celebrate her 26th birthday, Ogier died of a heart attack probably caused by a heart murmur condition she had since age 12, combined with drug use.

Ogier is buried in the Père Lachaise Cemetery in Paris. The film Down by Law (1986) is dedicated to her.

== Filmography ==
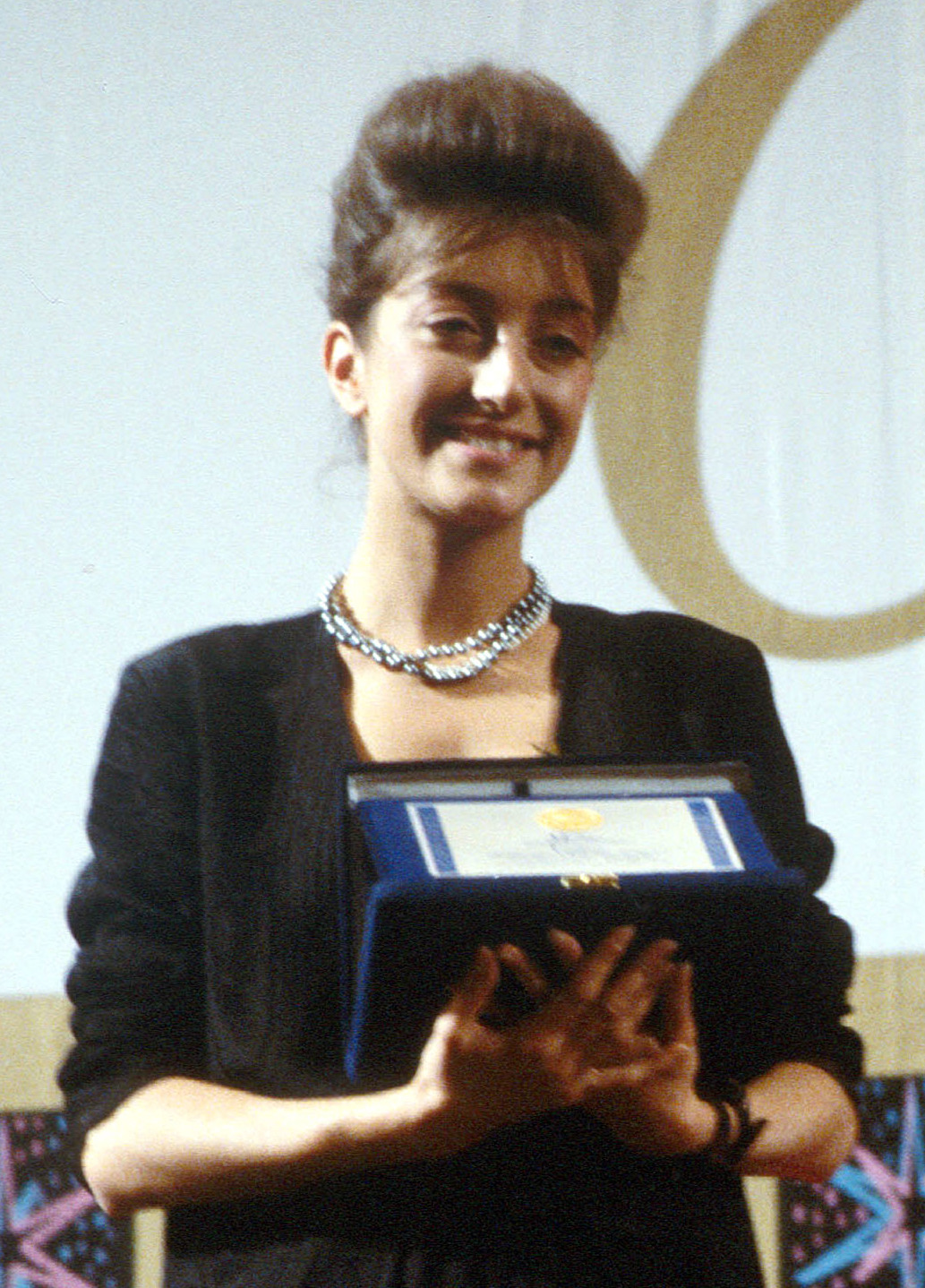
Ogier in 1984

=== Film ===
- Paulina Is Leaving (1969) – Little girl with candlestick (uncredited)
- Perceval le Gallois (1978) – chant, pucelle, dame
- Lady of the Camelias (1981) – Olympe (uncredited)
- Le Pont du Nord (1981) – Baptiste
- Il est trop tard pour rien (1982, short) – Claire
- Signes extérieurs de richesse (1983) – L'assistante médicale
- Ghost Dance (1983) – Pascale
- Full Moon in Paris (1984) – Louise
- Ave Maria (1984) – Angélique
- Rosette vend des roses (1985, short) – (final film role)

=== TV ===
- La vie comme ça (a.k.a. Life the Way It Is) (1978, TV movie) – Muriel Pucheu
- Catherine de Heilbronn (1980, TV movie) – Catherine de Heilbronn
