= Barbet Schroeder =

Iranian-born Swiss film director

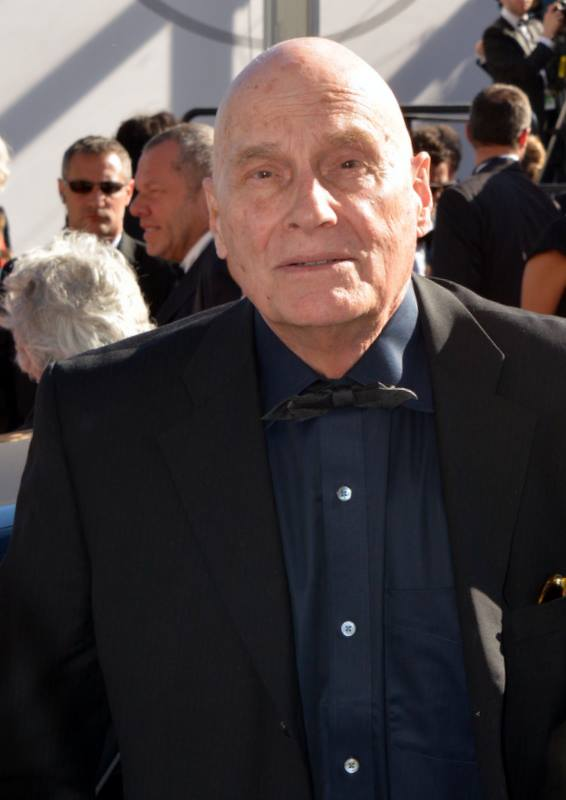
- Schroeder at the 2017 Cannes Film Festival
- Born: 26 August 1941 (age 85); Tehran, Iran
- Citizenship: Switzerland
- Occupations: Director, producer
- Spouse: Bulle Ogier

Barbet Schroeder (born 26 August 1941) is an Iranian-born Swiss film director and producer who started his career in French cinema in the 1960s, working with directors of the French New Wave such as Jean-Luc Godard, Jacques Rivette and Eric Rohmer.

Schroeder started his career producing such films as The Bakery Girl of Monceau (1962), Six in Paris (1965), and Celine and Julie Go Boating (1974). He then transitioned into directing films such as More (1969), La Vallée (1972), and Barfly (1987), the last of which was nominated for the Palme d'Or. He also gained recognition for directing the documentary Koko: A Talking Gorilla (1978). He directed what he labeled "The Trilogy of Evil": General Idi Amin Dada: A Self Portrait (1974), Terror's Advocate (2007), and The Venerable W. (2016).

Schroeder directed the drama Reversal of Fortune (1990) and earned a nomination for Academy Award for Best Director. He then directed many big budget Hollywood films, often mixing melodrama with the thriller genre in films like Single White Female (1992), Kiss of Death (1995), Desperate Measures (1998), and Murder by Numbers (2002). He also acted in Beverly Hills Cop III (1994), Mars Attacks! (1996), and The Darjeeling Limited (2007).

== Early life and education ==
Schroeder was born on 26 August 1941, in Tehran, the son of Ursula, a German physician, and Jean-William Schroeder, a Swiss geologist. From ages 6 to 11, he lived in Colombia where his father worked. Both he and his family then left for France, where he studied at the Sorbonne in Paris.

== Career ==
Schroeder's production company Les Films du Losange, founded by him at age 23, produced some of the best-known films of the French New Wave. His directorial debut, More (1969), about heroin addiction, became a hit in Europe. Pink Floyd wrote music for this movie and released the album, More. They also wrote the soundtrack for his 1972 film La Vallée, released as the album Obscured by Clouds.

Schroeder later went on to direct more mainstream Hollywood fare, such as Barfly (1987) starring Mickey Rourke, Single White Female (1992) and Reversal of Fortune (1990), for which Jeremy Irons as Claus von Bülow received an Academy Award. Despite his many commercially successful films, Schroeder continues to be interested in making smaller films with a more limited audience, such as the adaptation of Colombian writer Fernando Vallejo's controversial novel La virgen de los sicarios (2000) or the documentary General Idi Amin Dada: A Self Portrait (1974), featuring extensive interviews with the Ugandan dictator and Terror's Advocate (2007) about terrorism in the last fifty years, seen through the eyes of a lawyer, Jacques Vergès, and his clients.

Schroeder has also made some appearances as an actor: playing one of the 'ghosts' in Jacques Rivette's Céline et Julie vont en bateau (Céline and Julie Go Boating), a cameo as a Porsche driver in Beverly Hills Cop III (1994), as the President of France in Mars Attacks! (1996), as a hair products salesman in Paris, je t'aime (2006) and as the mechanic in The Darjeeling Limited (2007). Today, he resides in France and is married to actress Bulle Ogier.

In 2009, Schroeder signed a petition in support of film director Roman Polanski, calling for his release after Polanski was arrested in Switzerland in relation to his 1977 charge for drugging and raping a 13-year-old girl.

Schroeder directed the 12th episode of the third season of the American dramatic television series Mad Men that first aired on 1 November 2009. The episode was entitled "The Grown Ups", and was notable for its depiction of the events of the Kennedy assassination.

== Filmography ==
=== Film ===
Year	Title	Director	Writer	Producer	Notes
1964	Nadja in Paris	No	No	Yes	Directed by Eric Rohmer
1969	More	Yes	Yes	Yes	
1972	La Vallée	Yes	Yes	No	
1974	General Idi Amin Dada: A Self Portrait	Yes	Yes	No	Documentary film
1975	Maîtresse	Yes	Yes	Yes	
1978	Koko: A Talking Gorilla	Yes	Yes	Yes	Documentary film
1984	Cheaters (Tricheurs)	Yes	Yes	Yes	Un joueur (uncredited)
1985	The Charles Bukowski Tapes	Yes	Yes	Yes	Documentary film; also editor
1987	Barfly	Yes	No	Yes	
1990	Reversal of Fortune	Yes	No	No	
1992	Single White Female	Yes	No	Yes	
1995	Kiss of Death	Yes	No	Yes	
1996	Before and After	Yes	No	Yes	
1998	Desperate Measures	Yes	No	Yes	
2000	La virgen de los sicarios	Yes	No	Yes	
2002	Murder by Numbers	Yes	No	Yes	
2007	Terror's Advocate	Yes	No	Yes	Documentary film, also narrator
2008	Inju: The Beast in the Shadow	Yes	Yes	Yes	
2015	Amnesia	Yes	Yes	Yes	
2017	The Venerable W.	Yes	No	Yes	Documentary film
2023	Ricardo and Painting	Yes	No	Yes	Documentary film

As an actor

Year	Title	Role	Director	Notes
1963	The Bakery Girl of Monceau	car salesman	Eric Rohmer	also producer
1965	Six in Paris	Jean-Pierre	Jean Rouch	Segment: "Gare du Nord" also producer
1971	Out 1	Gian-Reto	Jacques Rivette	
1972	Out 1: Spectre	Gian-Reto	Jacques Rivette	
1974	Celine and Julie Go Boating	Olivier	Jacques Rivette	Also producer
1979	Roberta	Vittorio	Pierre Zucca	
1979	La Mémoire courte	Un invité au dîner	Eduardo de Gregorio	
1984	Love on the Ground	Audience	Jacque Rivette	uncredited
1990	The Golden Boat	Mean Passer-by	Raúl Ruiz	
1994	La Reine Margot	an advisor	Patrice Chéreau	
1994	Beverly Hills Cop III	Man in Porsche	John Landis	
1996	Mars Attacks!	Maurice, the French President	Tim Burton	
2004	Ne fais pas ça!	Un client du restaurant #1	Luc Bondy	
2005	Une aventure	Dr. Idelman	Xavier Giannoli	
2006	Paris, je t'aime	Monsieur Henny	Christopher Doyle	Segment: "Porte de Choisy"
2007	The Duchess of Langeais	Duc de Grandlieu	Jacques Rivette	
2007	The Darjeeling Limited	The Mechanic	Wes Anderson	
2011	L'avocat	Jacques Meco	Cédric Anger	
2012	Le grand soir	Jacques Meco	Benoît Delépine; Gustave Kervern	
2014	Portrait of the Artist	Le médecin	Antoine Barraud	final film role

=== Television ===
Year	Title	Director	Notes
2009	Mad Men	Yes	Episode: "The Grown-Ups"
