= Edda Dell'Orso =

Italian singer (born 1935)

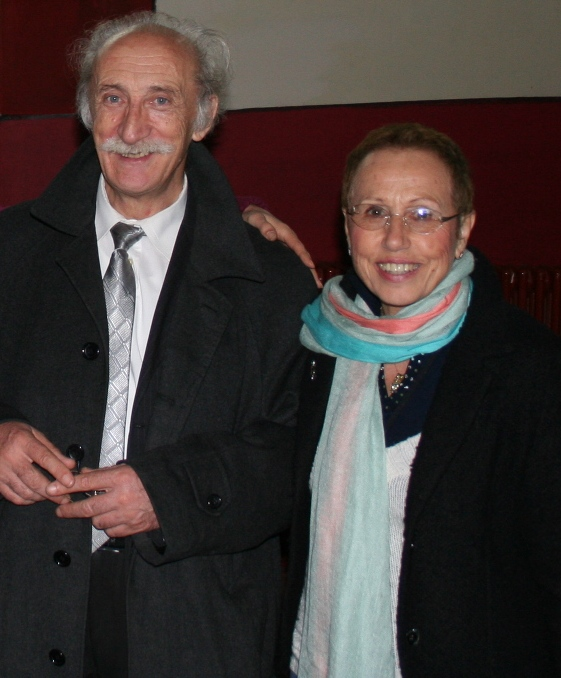
- Dell'Orso (right) with Nicola Samale in 2010
- Born: Edda Sabatini; February 16, 1935 (age 91); Genoa, Italy
- Occupation: Singer
- Spouse: Giacomo Dell'Orso (m. 1958; died 2024)

Edda Sabatini (born February 16, 1935), known as Edda Dell'Orso, (Note: Dell'Orso is the family name of Sabatini's husband, composer Giacomo Dell'Orso. In Italy, women do not change their legal name upon marriage.) is an Italian singer known for her collaboration with composer Ennio Morricone, for whom she provided wordless vocals to a large number of his film scores. A soprano with a three-octave range, Dell'Orso also provided vocals to scores of other Italian composers such as Bruno Nicolai, Piero Piccioni, Luis Bacalov and Roberto Pregadio. She was born in Genoa.

In Morricone's film scores of the original Spaghetti Westerns directed by Sergio Leone, her dramatic voice was deployed as an instrument for the first time and to revolutionary effect, such as in A Fistful of Dollars, The Good, the Bad, and the Ugly (in particular for "The Ecstasy of Gold" track) and Once Upon a Time in the West.

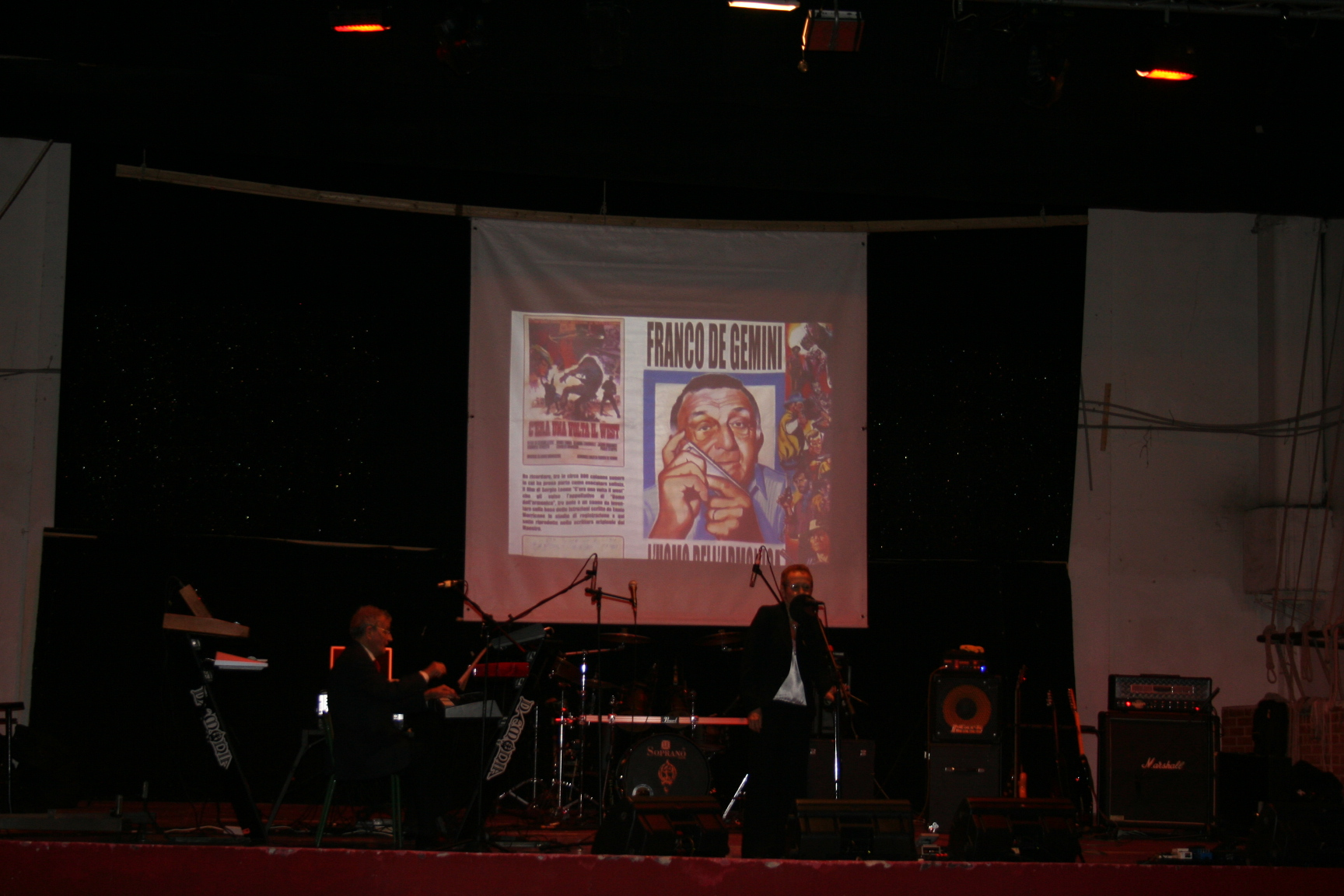
Soundtracks – A tribute to Pino Rucher. Edda Dell'Orso is singing a famous composition from the film Once Upon a Time in the West.

In the 1980s, she was the voice behind the successful Italo disco act Bianca Neve, fronted by Anne Dattner.

Dell'Orso collaborated with Italian composer Alex Puddu on the albums Registrazioni al Buio (2013, Schema Records), In the Eye Of The Cat (2016, Schema Records), The Mark of the Devil (2017, Al Dente) and The Gambler (2018).

== Selected filmography ==
Year	Film title	Composer	Director
1964	I Malamondo	Ennio Morricone	Paolo Cavara
1965	For A Few Dollars More	Ennio Morricone	Sergio Leone
1966	The Good, the Bad and the Ugly	Ennio Morricone	Sergio Leone
1967	Face to Face	Ennio Morricone	Sergio Sollima
1967	The Stranger	Piero Piccioni	Luchino Visconti
1967	Matchless	Ennio Morricone, Piero Piccioni	Alberto Lattuada
1967	Seli	Marcello Giombini	Primo Zeglio
1968	Ecce Homo	Ennio Morricone	Bruno Gaburro
1968	Eva, la venere selvaggia	Roberto Pregadio	Roberto Mauri
1968	Guns for San Sebastian	Ennio Morricone	Henri Verneuil
1968	Listen, Let's Make Love	Ennio Morricone	Vittorio Caprioli
1968	Once Upon a Time in the West	Ennio Morricone	Sergio Leone
1968	Diabolik	Ennio Morricone	Mario Bava
1968	They Came to Rob Las Vegas	Georges Garvarentz	Antonio Isasi-Isasmendi
1969	Eugenie… The Story of Her Journey into Perversion	Bruno Nicolai	Jess Franco
1969	Love Birds	Bruno Nicolai	Mario Caiano
1969	The Laughing Woman	Stelvio Cipriani	Piero Schivazappa
1969	Angeli bianchi...angeli neri	Piero Umiliani	Luigi Scattini
1969	The Red Tent	Ennio Morricone	Mikhail Kalatozov
1969	Police Chief Pepe	Armando Trovajoli	Ettore Scola
1969	The Invisible Woman	Ennio Morricone	Paolo Spinola
1969	Carnal Circuit	Bruno Nicolai	Alberto De Martino
1969	Metti, una sera a cena	Ennio Morricone	Giuseppe Patroni Griffi
1969	Interrabang	Berto Pisano	Giuliano Biagetti
1970	Intimità proibite di una giovane sposa	Stelvio Cipriani	Oscar Brazzi
1970	Le Mans, Shortcut to Hell	Stelvio Cipriani	Osvaldo Civirani
1970	Le foto proibite di una signora per bene	Ennio Morricone	Luciano Ercoli
1970	When Women Had Tails	Ennio Morricone	Pasquale Festa Campanile
1970	The Most Beautiful Wife	Ennio Morricone	Damiano Damiani
1970	The Bird with the Crystal Plumage	Ennio Morricone	Dario Argento
1970	Edipeon	Stelvio Cipriani	Lorenzo Artale
1971	Short Night of Glass Dolls	Ennio Morricone	Aldo Lado
1971	Deserto di fuoco	Roberto Pregadio, Franco Bixio	Renzo Merusi
1971	Winged Devils	Ennio Morricone	Duccio Tessari
1971	The Cat o' Nine Tails	Ennio Morricone	Dario Argento
1971	The Fifth Cord	Ennio Morricone	Luigi Bazzoni
1971	Duck, You Sucker!	Ennio Morricone	Sergio Leone
1971	His Name Was King	Luis Bacalov	Giancarlo Romitelli
1971	The Burglars	Ennio Morricone	Henri Verneuil
1971	Kill! Kill! Kill! Kill!	Jacques Chaumont, Berto Pisano	Romain Gary
1971	Questo sporco mondo meraviglioso	Piero Umiliani	Mino Loy, Luigi Scattini
1971	A Virgin Among the Living Dead	Bruno Nicolai	Jess Franco
1971	The Blonde in the Blue Movie	Armando Trovajoli	Steno
1971	In the Eye of the Hurricane	Piero Piccioni	José María Forqué
1971	The Man with Icy Eyes	Peppino De Luca	Alberto De Martino
1971	Veruschka, poesia di una donna	Ennio Morricone	Franco Rubartelli
1971	Black Belly of the Tarantula	Ennio Morricone	Paolo Cavara
1971	A Lizard in a Woman's Skin	Ennio Morricone	Lucio Fulci
1971	The Night Evelyn Came Out of the Grave	Bruno Nicolai	Emilio Miraglia
1971	Bella di giorno moglie di notte	Gianfranco Plenizio	Nello Rossati
1971	Four Flies on Grey Velvet	Ennio Morricone	Dario Argento
1971	Human Cobras	Stelvio Cipriani	Bitto Albertini
1971	Stress	Carlo Savina	Corrado Prisco
1971	Maddalena	Ennio Morricone	Jerzy Kawalerowicz
1972	What Have You Done to Solange?	Ennio Morricone	Massimo Dallamano
1972	Spirits of Death	Fiorenzo Carpi	Romano Scavolini
1972	I figli chiedono perché	Ennio Morricone	Nino Zanchin
1972	Amuck!	Teo Usuelli	Silvio Amadio
1972	The Grand Duel	Luis Bacalov, Sergio Bardotti	Giancarlo Santi
1972	The Master and Margaret	Ennio Morricone	Aleksandar Petrović
1972	Devil in the Brain	Ennio Morricone	Sergio Sollima
1972	La cosa buffa	Ennio Morricone	Aldo Lado
1972	La gatta in calore	Gianfranco Plenizio	Nello Rossati
1972	The Night of the Devils	Giorgio Gaslini	Giorgio Ferroni
1972	So Sweet, So Dead	Giorgio Gaslini	Roberto Bianchi Montero
1973	Death Smiles on a Murderer	Berto Pisano	Joe D'Amato
1973	Sinbad and the Caliph of Baghdad	Alessandro Alessandroni	Pietro Francisci
1973	Increase and Multiply	Ennio Morricone	Giulio Petroni
1973	Un modo di essere donna	Piero Piccioni	Pier Ludovico Pavoni
1973	Night Flight from Moscow	Ennio Morricone	Henri Verneuil
1973	Sessomatto	Armando Trovajoli	Dino Risi
1974	The Cousin	Ennio Morricone	Aldo Lado
1974	The Secret	Ennio Morricone	Robert Enrico
1974	Prigione di donne	Albert Verrecchia	Brunello Rondi
1974	Lisa and the Devil	Carlo Savina	Mario Bava
1974	The Stranger and the Gunfighter	Carlo Savina	Antonio Margheriti
1975	Autopsy	Ennio Morricone	Armando Crispino
1975	Weak Spot	Ennio Morricone	Peter Fleischmann
1975	A Diary of a Murderess	Carlo Savina	Manuel Mur Oti
1975	A Genius, Two Partners and a Dupe	Ennio Morricone	Damiano Damiani
1976	Hallucination Strip	Albert Verrecchia	Lucio Marcaccini
1976	Vortex	Stelvio Cipriani	Sergio Gobbi
1977	The Cat	Ennio Morricone	Luigi Comencini
1977	Orca	Ennio Morricone	Michael Anderson
1978	The Last House on the Beach	Roberto Pregadio	Francesco Prosperi
1979	Orient Express	Ennio Morricone	Daniele D'Anza, Marcel Moussy, Bruno Gantillon
1980	Paradiso Blu	Stelvio Cipriani	Joe D'Amato
1980	Il Ladrone	Ennio Morricone	Pasquale Festa Campanile
1981	Comin' at Ya!	Carlo Savina	Ferdinando Baldi
1981	Caligula and Messalina	Giacomo Dell'Orso	Bruno Mattei
1982	Nero and Poppea: An Orgy of Power	Giacomo Dell'Orso	Bruno Mattei
1984	Once Upon a Time in America	Ennio Morricone	Sergio Leone
1988	The Secret of the Sahara	Ennio Morricone	Alberto Negrin
1996	Nostromo	Ennio Morricone	Alastair Reid
1998	Incontri proibiti	Piero Piccioni	Alberto Sordi
2013	The Best Offer	Ennio Morricone	Giuseppe Tornatore
