= Ezio Marano =

Italian actor

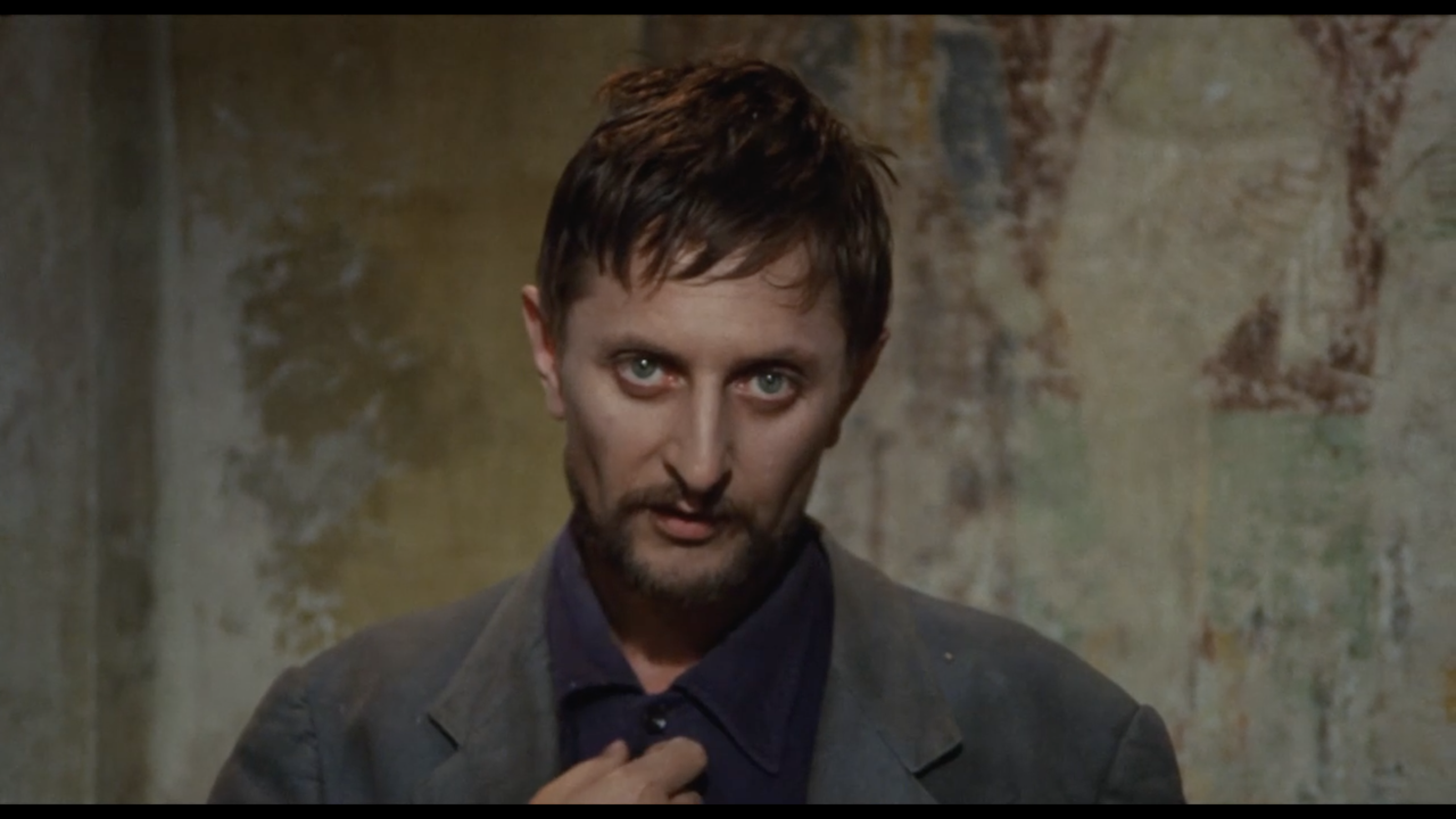
Ezio Marano in a 1971 movie

Ezio Marano (6 August 1927, Brescia – 26 April 1991, Rome) was an Italian actor.

== Biography ==
He made his debut in the theater in the mid-50s at the Piccolo Teatro in Milan under the guidance of Giorgio Strehler, in a long series of performances in both Italian and the Lombard dialect; he then entered into more and more companies in smaller but significant parts, working simultaneously on television and Radio Rai. For television, he was among the performers on the TV drama Napoleon a Sant'Elena, directed by Vittorio Cottafavi in 1973.

He made his debut in the cinema comparatively late, in 1969, under the direction of Mauro Severino, and continued his film career, with his last movie being Ginger and Fred, directed by Federico Fellini in 1985. He died on 26 April 1991 by a lingering disease that had struck him three years earlier.

== Radio ==
- Santa Giovanna, by George Bernard Shaw, directed by Sandro Bolchi, directed by 19 June 1956.

== Television ==
- Anna von Barnheim, ovvero la fortuna del soldato, directed by Flaminio Bollini, transmitted on 17 June 1963.
- La miliardaria, directed by Giuliana Berlinguer, 1972.

== Theatre ==
- Arlecchino servitore di due padroni, by Carlo Goldoni, directed by Giorgio Strehler, in Edimburgo on 27 August 1956.
- La visita della vecchia signora, by Friedrich Dürrenmatt, directed by Strehler, played at the Piccolo Theatre in Milan, 31 January 1960.
- Così è se vi pare, by Luigi Pirandello, directed by Mario Ferrero, in theatres from 1963 to 1964.

== Filmography ==
- Mangiala (1968) - Boroni
- Vergogna schifosi (1969, directed by Mauro Severino) - Artusi - friend of Lea
- They Call Me Trinity (1970, directed by E.B. Clucher) - Frank Faina / Weasel
- Una prostituta al servizio del pubblico e in regola con le leggi dello stato (1969, directed by Italo Zingarelli)
- A Lizard in a Woman's Skin (1971, directed by Lucio Fulci) - Lowell (scientific squad)
- Black Belly of the Tarantula (1971, directed by Paolo Cavara) - Masseur
- Scipio the African (1971, directed by Luigi Magni) - Gaio Scribonio
- The Working Class Goes to Heaven (1971, directed by Elio Petri) - Timekeeper
- Maddalena (1971, directed by Jerzy Kawalerowicz)
- This Kind of Love (1972, directed by Alberto Bevilacqua)
- Trinità e Sartana figli di... di Mario Siciliano (1972) - The Tiger
- A White Dress for Marialé (1972, directed by Romano Scavolini) - Sebastiano
- Amore e morte nel giardino degli dei (1972, directed by Sauro Scavolini) - Martin / Psychiatrist
- Alleluja & Sartana are Sons... Sons of God (1972, directed by Mario Siciliano) - The Wolf
- The Assassination of Matteotti (1973, directed by Florestano Vancini) - Alcide De Gasperi
- La nipote (1974, directed by Nello Rossati) - Romeo-The Doctor
- I figli di nessuno (1974, directed by Bruno Gaburro)
- Challenge to White Fang (1974, directed by Lucio Fulci) - Gambler
- Terminal (1974, directed by Paolo Brecci)
- Il tempo dell'inizio (1974, directed by Luigi Di Gianni)
- L'ingenua (1975, directed by Gianfranco Baldanello) - Cornelio
- Morel's Invention (1976, directed by Emidio Greco)
- Campagnola bella (1976, directed by Luca Delli Azzeri)
- Il signor ministro li prese tutti e subito (1977, directed by Sergio Alessandrini)
- Crime Busters (1977, directed by E.B. Clucher) - Bloodsucker
- Beast with a Gun (1977, directed by Sergio Grieco)
- Ridendo e scherzando (1978, directed by Marco Aleandri) - Chief of carabinieri
- Atsalut pater (1979, directed by Paolo Cavara) - Avv. Carrara
- Liberté, Égalité, Choucroute (1985, directed by Jean Yanne) - Un député
- Ginger and Fred (1986, directed by Federico Fellini) - The Intellectual
- Sposerò Simon Le Bon (1986, directed by Carlo Cotti)
- Abatjour 2 (1989) - (final film role)
