= La fuga (1965 film) =

1965 film

The Escape
- Directed by: Paolo Spinola
- Written by: Sergio Amidei; Piero Bellanova
- Starring: Giovanna Ralli; Anouk Aimée; Paul Guers; Enrico Maria Salerno
- Cinematography: Marcello Gatti; Armando Nannuzzi
- Edited by: Nino Baragli
- Music by: Piero Piccioni
- Release date: 1965
- Country: Italy
- Language: Italian

La fuga, also known as The Escape, is a 1965 Italian drama film directed by Paolo Spinola. For this film Giovanna Ralli was awarded with a David di Donatello for Best Actress.

== Cast ==
- Giovanna Ralli as Piera
- Anouk Aimée as Luisa
- Paul Guers as Andrea
- Enrico Maria Salerno as Analyst
- Maurizio Arena as Alberto
- Jone Salinas as Mother of Andrea
- Guido Alberti as Father of Piera
- Carol Walker as Mother of Piera
- Ignazio Dolce as the diver

== Production ==
The film marked the directorial debut of Paolo Spinola; for the lead role, he chose Giovanna Ralli, whom he had met in 1953 on the set of It Happened in the Park, where he had worked as an assistant director. Spinola described the film as "the analysis of a marital relationship based entirely on a psychoanalytic fabric of a Freudian type", and the screenplay was co-written with psychoanalyst Piero Bellanova.

== Release ==
The film received a domestic theatrical release in early 1965. It was picked up by 20th Century Fox for international distribution, and released in the United States, where it premiered in New York in March 1966 as The Escape. Fox released it also in France, Mexico, and West Germany.

== Reception ==
Italian film historian Roberto Curti described the film as "one of the finest feature film debuts of the decade", "surprisingly elegant" and with an "extraordinary visual style". According to Fox records, the film needed to earn $700,000 in rentals to break even and made $230,000, meaning it made a loss.
