= L'ingenua =

1975 film by Gianfranco Baldanello

- Directed by: Gianfranco Baldanello
- Written by: Giacomo Gramegna
- Produced by: Armando Bertuccioli
- Starring: Ilona Staller; George Ardisson
- Cinematography: Romano Scavolini
- Edited by: Francesco Bertuccioli
- Music by: Carlo Savina
- Release date: 1975
- Country: Italy
- Language: Italian

L'ingenua is a 1975 Italian commedia sexy all'italiana and road movie directed by Gianfranco Baldanello. The film featured Ilona Staller in her first lead role and shared an almost identical essential cast and filming locations with the earlier Armando Bertuccioli film La nipote.

== Plot ==
Piero Spazin is a con artist who meets his friend Luigi Beton, a fraudster, and the two get engaged in a new fraud scheme, also attempting to trick each other at the same time. Angela, a supposedly naïve employee of Piero's fiancée Augusta (Anna Maria Pescatori) becomes accidentally involved in their plan and agrees to accompany them on their journey. However, Susy, another con artist joins the group after meeting Luigi's son Rodolfo making things even more complicated.

== Cast ==
- Ilona Staller as Angela
- George Ardisson as Piero Spazin
- Daniele Vargas as Luigi Beton
- Anna Maria Pescatori as Augusta Bortolon
- Orchidea De Santis as Susy
- Graziano Chiaro as Rodolfo
- Ezio Marano as Cornelio
- Otello Cazzola as Augusta's father
- Antonia Cazzola as Cornelio's mother
- Patrizia Bilardo as Elvira (Cornelio's wife)
- Achille Grioni as the priest
- Enzo Spitaleri as the notary
