= Rose Spot =

1969 drama film

- Directed by: Enzo Muzii
- Screenplay by: Tommaso Chiaretti; Enzo Muzii; Ludovica Ripa di Meana
- Starring: Giancarlo Giannini; Valeria Moriconi
- Cinematography: Luciano Tovoli
- Edited by: Gerardo Bortolan
- Music by: Shawn Phillips
- Release date: 1969
- Language: Italian

Rose Spot (Italian: Una macchia rosa) is a 1969 Italian drama film co-written and directed by Enzo Muzii and starring Giancarlo Giannini.

== Cast ==
- Giancarlo Giannini as Giancarlo
- Valeria Moriconi as Valeria
- Ginevra Benini as Mary
- Orchidea De Santis as Nadia
- Stefanella Giovannini as Gabry
- Delia Boccardo as Livia
- Harold Null as Giancarlo's Uncle
- Ivan Ricci as Ivan
- Carlo Leva as Production Designer in the Set
- Leopoldo Trieste as Actor in the Set

== Release ==
The film had its premiere at the 17th San Sebastián International Film Festival. It was screened at 30th Venice International Film Festival, in the Informativa sidebar.

== Reception ==
A review from La Stampa wrote: "Filmed at a slow pace, as if to follow every symptom of its protagonist's crisis, Una macchia rosa stands apart from commercial productions due to its complete lack of clichés or crowd-pleasing gimmicks. Aside from a touch of excessive melancholy in the final scenes, Muzii's work is cohesive, solidly supported by the performance of Giancarlo Giannini and the women around him". A contemporary Variety review noted: "Enzo Muzii [...] reconfirms is maturing talent with this followup pic, an intimately-glimpsed, splendidly-lensed tale set in present day Rome.".
