= Adriana Ambesi =

Italian film actress (1940–2023)

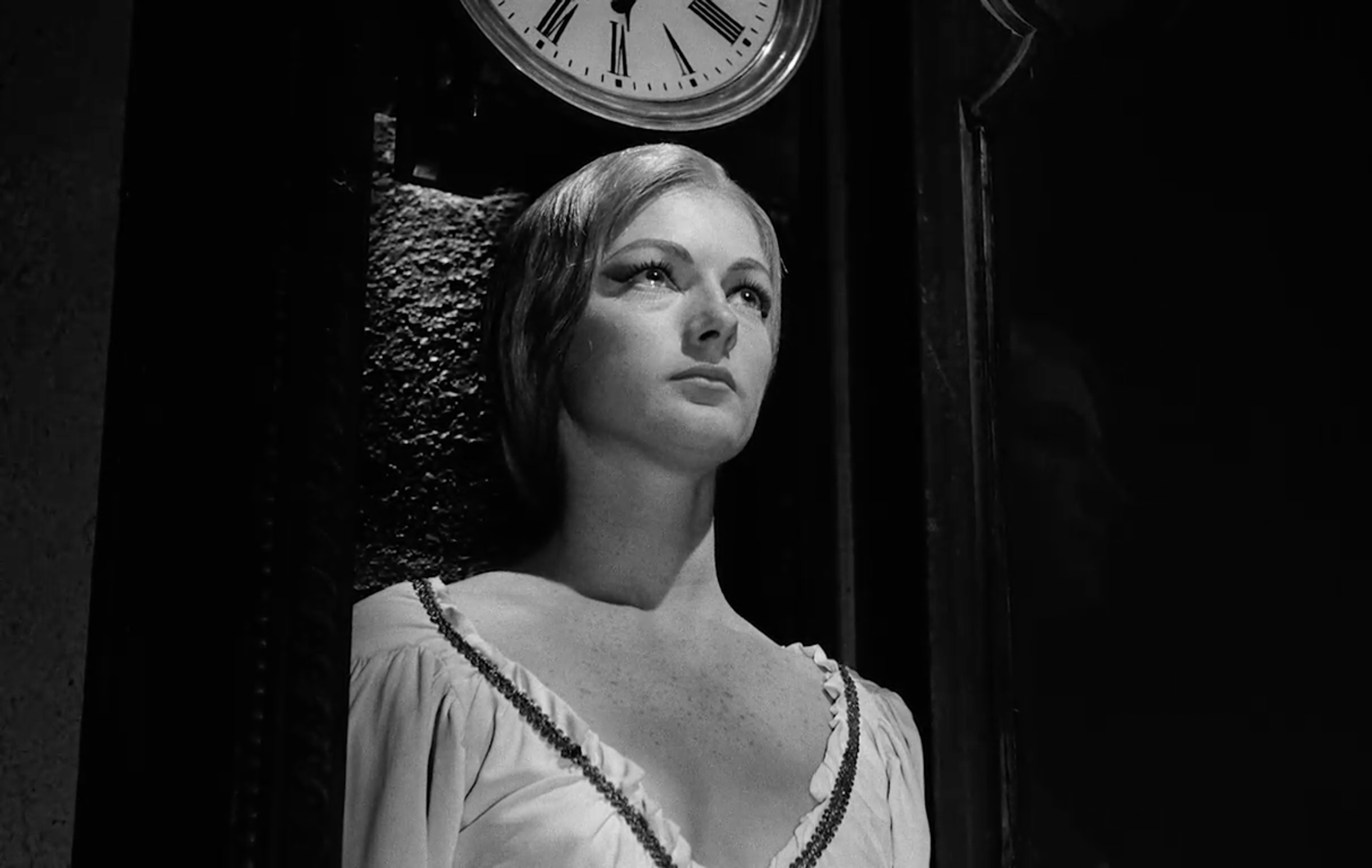
- Ambesi in the movie Katarsis (1963)
- Born: 18 April 1940; Turin, Kingdom of Italy
- Died: 28 February 2023 (aged 82); Rome, Italy
- Other name: Audrey Amber
- Occupation: Actress
- Years active: 1963–1976 (film and television)

Adriana Ambesi (18 April 1940 – 28 February 2023) was an Italian film actress of the 1960s. She was sometimes credited as Audrey Amber. Ambesi was born in Turin on 18 April 1940, and died in Rome on 28 February 2023, at the age of 82.

== Filmography ==
Year	Title	Role	Notes
1963	Katarsis	Castle lady	
1963	Samson and the Sea Beast	Sarah	
1963	The Tyrant of Castile		
1964	Mission to Hell	Dancer	
1964	Adolescenti al sole		
1964	Terror in the Crypt	Laura Karnstein	
1964	La costanza della ragione		Uncredited
1965	Guns of Nevada	Julia Brooks	
1965	Hercules the Avenger	Deyanira	
1966	Ringo's Big Night	Annette	
1966	Secret Agent Super Dragon	Verna	
1966	How We Robbed the Bank of Italy	Paolo's Friend	
1966	Seven Vengeful Women	Betty Grimaldi	
1966	The Bible: In the Beginning...	Daughter of Lot	
1966	Love Italian Style	Iolanda	
1967	Death Walks in Laredo	Girl in the Dark Alley	
1967	Ten Thousand Dollars for a Massacre	Dolores Mendoza	
1968	A Stranger in Paso Bravo	Rosy	
1968	Vedove inconsolabili in cerca di... distrazioni		
1969	Malenka	Velinka - the Count's Bride	

== Bibliography ==
- Thomas Weisser. Spaghetti Westerns: the Good, the Bad and the Violent. McFarland, 2005.
