= Agent 3S3: Passport to Hell =

1965 film directed by Sergio Sollima

Agente 3S3: Passaporto per l'inferno
- Italian theatrical release poster
- Directed by: Sergio Sollima
- Written by: Jesús María de Arozamena, Alfonso Balcázar
- Produced by: Cesáreo González
- Cinematography: Carlo Carlini
- Edited by: Bruno Mattei
- Music by: Piero Umiliani
- Production companies: Cineproduzioni Associate * Producciones Balcazar * Les Films Copernic
- Release date: 1965
- Countries: Italy; Spain; France

Agente 3S3: Passaporto per l'inferno or Agent 3S3:Passport to Hell is a 1965 Italian adventure-eurospy film directed by Sergio Sollima, here credited as Simon Sterling. This is the first chapter in the Sollima's spy film trilogy, and inaugurated the film series of the Agent 3S3 played by George Ardisson. It is also the first Sollima's full-length film, after the segment he shot for the anthology film Of Wayward Love three years before.

Location filming includes Spain, Rome, Beirut and Vienna. This was followed by the sequel Agent 3S3, Massacre in the Sun (1966) also directed by Sollima that was shot back to back.

== Cast ==
- George Ardisson as Walter Ross, Agent 3S3
- Barbara Simon as Irmgard von Wittstein
- José Marco as Ahmed
- Georges Rivière as Professor Steve Dickson
- Franco Andrei as Bellamy (as Frank Andrews)
- Liliane Fernani as Karina (as Senta Heller)
- Seyna Seyn as Jackye Vein
- Charles Kalinski as Salkoff (as Karl Wirth)
- Francisco Sanz as Nobell (as Paco Sanz / Paul Fabian)
- Henri Cogan as Sanz (as Heinrich Rauch)
- Fernando Sancho as Colonel Dolukin (as Ferdinand Bergmann)
- Béatrice Altariba as Elisa von Sloot
- Sal Borgese as Man in Vienna Bar
- Jeff Cameron

== Reception ==
In a contemporary review, the Monthly Film Bulletin stated that ″attractive locationsasare small compensation for the general stodginess of the latest cosmopolitan spy thriller. After a promising beginning, with the hero's car sandwiched between two huge lorries on a snow-bound country road, the plot resolves itself into the customary round of brawls and brawn.″
