= Amarsi un po' (film) =

- Italian theatrical release poster by Renato Casaro
- Directed by: Carlo Vanzina
- Written by: Carlo Vanzina; Enrico Vanzina
- Produced by: Mario Cecchi Gori; Vittorio Cecchi Gori
- Starring: Claudio Amendola; Tahnee Welch; Virna Lisi
- Cinematography: Claudio Cirillo
- Edited by: Raimondo Crociani
- Music by: Mario Lavezzi
- Release date: 1984
- Language: Italian

Amarsi un po (English: "To Love a Little") is a 1984 Italian romantic comedy film co-written and directed by Carlo Vanzina. starring Claudio Amendola, Tahnee Welch,Virna Lisi.

== Plot ==
Cristiana is a young and beautiful princess in Rome, bored by her life and her traditional parents. Marco is a young electrician and the son of a news agent. The two meet due to a minor car accident; they like each other and decide to be together despite the differences in class. Soon a great love is born, but in the long run the misunderstandings due to the different social background prevail: on the occasion of a holiday with some friends of the girl, the differences in style and behavior are highlighted, also due to the presence of an old flame of Cristiana.

The two break up, and she plans a wedding with the wealthy French nobleman Felix Rothschild. But the love between Marco and Cristiana did not fade or die. Marco, having learned of Cristiana's imminent wedding, leaves by car from Rome to Paris; he falls asleep while driving and collides with a truck. Meanwhile, Cristiana gets married but when she is departing for her honeymoon, she reads in the newspaper about Marco's accident, leaves her husband and goes to the hospital, choosing to return to the boy.

== Cast ==
- Claudio Amendola: Marco Coccia
- Tahnee Welch: Princess Cristiana Cellini
- Virna Lisi: Princess Marisa Cellini
- Riccardo Garrone: Prince Cellini
- Giacomo Rosselli: Prince Ugo Cellini
- Mario Brega: Augusto Coccia
- Rossana Di Lorenzo: Maria Coccia
- Nicolina Papetti: The neighbor
- Paolo Baroni: marquis Ludovico Brunelli
- Isabella Rocchietta: marchesina Brunelli
- Nicoletta Elmi: Amanda Orselli
- Mario Brega: Augusto Coccia
- Rossana Di Lorenzo: Maria Coccia
- Fabrizio Bracconeri: Micione

== See also ==
- List of Italian films of 1984
