= Katarsis (film) =

- 1965 poster for Katarsis
- Directed by: Giuseppe Vegezzi
- Written by: Giuseppe Vegezzi
- Story by: Giuseppe Vegezzi
- Produced by: Fernando Cerqua
- Starring: Christopher Lee; Giorgio Adrisson; Bella Cortez
- Cinematography: Mario Parapetti; Angelo Baistrocchi
- Edited by: Enzo Alfonsi
- Music by: Berto Pisano
- Production companies: Serena Film; Filmsonor
- Distributed by: Mangusta (Italy)
- Release date: September 9, 1963 (Italy)
- Running time: 87 minutes
- Country: Italy
- Budget: ₤46 million

Katarsis (Italian: Sfida al diavolo), is a 1963 Italian horror film directed and written by Giuseppe Vegezzi. It is his only film. A group of people enter an old castle where they come across an old man (Christopher Lee) who turns out to be the Devil.

== Cast ==
Credits adapted from the book Italian Gothic Horror, 1957-1969.

- Christopher Lee as Lord of the Castle (credited as 'Cristopher Lee')
- Giorgio Ardisson (credited as George Ardisson) as Gugo
- Vittori Centroni (credited as Lilly Parker) as Maga
- Anita Cacciolata (credited as Anita Deyer) as Jenny
- Alice Paneque (credited as Bella Cortez) as Frie
- Mario Polletin (credited as Mario Zacarti) as Gian
- Adriana Ambesi as Castle lady
- Pietro Vidali (credited as Piero Vada) as Peo

== Production ==
Katarsis was shot at Odescalchi Castle in Bracciano and Montelibretti and Olympia Studios in Rome between 14 May and 7 June 1963. It had a low budget of 46 million Italian lira. Christopher Lee was one of the few name actors in it; he was on-set for one week. In Lee's autobiography, he states that he never saw the film or its dailies and that it was later split into two films. This is incorrect; however, the film was released in two versions, the later one with more footage.

== Release ==
Katarsis was released in Italy on September 9, 1963 where it was distributed by Mangusta. Shortly after it received its distribution visa, its production company I Della Films filed for bankruptcy. Katarsis was then purchased by Eco Films and re-released in a re-edited version, Sfida al diavolo, in 1965. This latter version runs 78 minutes and includes new scenes involving a dancer.

== Reception ==
Roberto Curti, author of Italian Gothic Horror Films, 1957-1969 described the director's work ranging between "naive and terrible".

== See also ==
- Christopher Lee filmography
- List of Italian films of 1963
- List of horror films of 1963
