= Samson and the Sea Beast =

Samson Against the Pirates
- Directed by: Tanio Boccia
- Screenplay by: Guido Malatesta
- Produced by: Fortunato Misiano
- Starring: Kirk Morris; Margaret Lee; Daniele Vargas
- Cinematography: Augusto Tiezzi
- Edited by: Jolanda Benvenuti
- Music by: Angelo Francesco Lavagnino
- Production company: Romana Film
- Release date: 29 July 1963 (Italy)
- Running time: 89 minutes
- Country: Italy

Samson and the Sea Beast (Italian: Sansone contro i pirati, also known as Samson Against the Pirates) is a 1963 Italian peplum film directed by Tanio Boccia.

== Plot ==
A pirate terrorises the Antilles. He plunders ships, slaughtering their crews and selling women as slaves. One of the women asks a man named Samson for help battling the pirates.

== Cast ==
- Kirk Morris: Samson
- Margaret Lee: Amanda
- Daniele Vargas: Murad
- Aldo Bufi Landi: Manuel
- Tullio Altamura: Mobed
- Adriana Ambesi: Sarah
- Attilio Dottesio: Alvarez
- Calisto Calisti: Ibrahim
- Nello Pazzafini: Sandor

== Release ==
Samson Against the Pirates was released in Italy on 29 July 1963. It was also released as Samson and the Sea Beasts.
