= Escape by Night (1960 film) =

1960 film by Roberto Rossellini

Era Notte a Roma
- Directed by: Roberto Rossellini
- Written by: Sergio Amidei; Diego Fabbri; Brunello Rondi; Roberto Rossellini
- Produced by: Giovan Battista Romanengo
- Starring: Giovanna Ralli; Leo Genn
- Cinematography: Carlo Carlini
- Edited by: Roberto Cinquini
- Music by: Renzo Rossellini
- Production companies: International Golden Star; Dismage Film
- Distributed by: Cineriz
- Release dates: 13 May 1960 (France); 7 October 1960 (Italy); September 1960 (U.S.)
- Running time: 157/145/114 minutes
- Countries: Italy; France
- Languages: Italian; English; Russian; German

Escape by Night (Italian: Era notte a Roma, French: Les Évadés de la nuit, also titled Blackout in Rome) is a 1960 Italian–French war drama film co-written and directed by Roberto Rossellini.

== Plot ==
Italy in late 1943: Three Allied prisoners of war, one British, one American, one Russian, escape and hide from the German and Italian fascist troops in Rome, helped by a young Roman couple, Esperia and her communist fiancé Renato. Shortly after secretly celebrating Christmas together, Esperia, Renato and Russian Sergeant Nazukov are arrested by German troops, denounced by fascist collaborator Tarcisio. Nazukov is shot during the arrest, and Renato tortured and later executed. Major Pemberton and Lieutenant Bradley first find shelter in the house of Prince Antoniani and later in the Catholic convent of Don Valerio. Bradley leaves with intent to join the American troops in the South, while Pemberton stays at the convent until the priests are denounced by Tarcisio for hiding fugitives in their midst. Pemberton returns to Esperia's flat, who grieves over Renato's death. When the German troops leave Rome due to the advancing Allies, Tarcisio shows up at Esperia's apartment to talk her into coming with him to the North. Esperia pours boiling water over Tarcisio, and Pemberton kills him. Afterwards, they confess their deed to Don Valerio. Esperia accuses herself of being a spy as well, because she denounced Pemberton and Bradley to save Renato. From the building's roof, Esperia, Pemberton and Don Valerio watch the Allied troops enter Rome.

== Cast ==
- Giovanna Ralli as Esperia Belli
- Renato Salvatori as Renato Balducci
- Leo Genn as Major Michael Pemberton (British)
- Sergei Bondarchuk as Sergeant Fyodor Nazukov (Russian)
- Peter Baldwin as Lieutenant Peter Bradley (American)
- Paolo Stoppa as Principe Alessandro Antoniani
- Enrico Maria Salerno as Dr. Costanzi
- Hannes Messemer as Oberst (Colonel) Baron von Kleist
- Sergio Fantoni as Don Valerio
- Laura Betti as Teresa
- Rosalba Neri as Erika Almagid
- George Petrarca as Tarcisio

== Release ==
Escape by Night premiered at the 13th Cannes Film Festival on 13 May 1960 in a version running 157 minutes. The film was also shown at the Karlovy Vary International Film Festival (July 1960), and at the San Francisco International Film Festival (October–November 1960) as a last-minute substitution for Federico Fellini's La Dolce Vita, which had been pulled by its producer at the last minute.

A version trimmed down to 114 minutes was released in Italian cinemas on 7 October 1960. The French release followed in 1961 with a running time of approximately 140 minutes. (Note: Ulrich Döge states a running time of 140 minutes of the French version, while the version screened at the Cinémathèque Française in 2006 reportedly ran 136.) International versions of the film ran approximately 145 minutes. According to film historians Mira Liehm and Peter Bondanella, the film was both commercially and artistically unsuccessful, resulting in Rossellini turning exclusively to television. The film had its New York premiere not until 9 April 1982.

== Home media ==
A DVD edition containing both the International cinema version and the original full length version which had been screened at the Cannes Film Festival was released in Italy in 2008. DVDs of the cinema version have also been released in the U.S. and in the U.K.

== Awards ==
- Special Jury Mentions at the Karlovy Vary International Film Festival for director Roberto Rossellini and actress Giovanna Ralli
- Golden Gate Award at the San Francisco International Film Festival for Best Actress Giovanna Ralli
