= George Ardisson =

Italian actor (1931–2014)

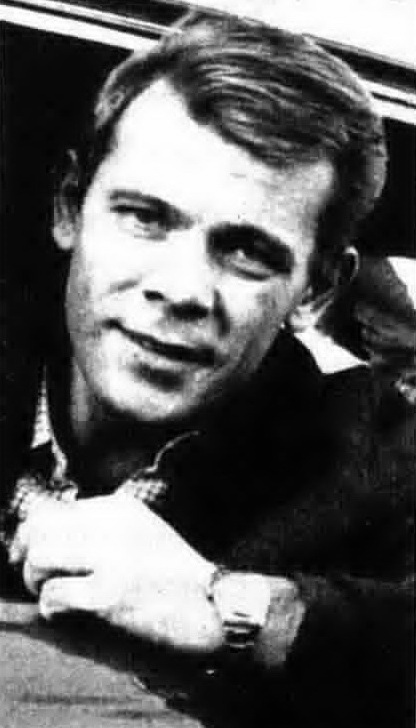
- Born: Giorgio Ardisson; 31 December 1931; Turin, Italy
- Died: 11 December 2014 (aged 82); Rome, Italy
- Occupation: Actor
- Years active: 1960–1992

Giorgio Ardisson (31 December 1931 – 11 December 2014), often credited as best known as George Ardisson, was an Italian actor. He was known as a leading man of sword-and-sandal and Eurospy films of the 1960s.

== Life and career ==
Ardisson was born in the Rocca Canavese municipality of Turin in 1931. His father was a native of Piedmont and his mother was from Calabria. Moving to Rome in 1959, he debuted in a minor role in Mauro Bolognini's comedy film You're on Your Own. His athletic build and classically-handsome appearance made him a popular casting choice for sword-and-sandal (peplum) films, he notably co-starred in Mario Bava's Hercules in the Haunted World and Erik the Conqueror (both 1961), playing the title role in the latter.

Ardisson gained a huge success playing Agent 3S3 in the eurospy films Agent 3S3: Passport to Hell and Agent 3S3, Massacre in the Sun. According to director Sergio Sollima, he was chosen for this role thanks to his physical appearance that made him credible as American.

Later, Ardisson starred in several more spy films and spanned different genres, including Spaghetti Westerns and horror films. In an interview, he stated he turned down several leading roles because he wanted to play more challenging parts. Though his later career was largely relegated to low-budget B and Z movies, one of his more notable roles was in Moroccan director Souheil Ben-Barka's anti-apartheid drama Amok (1983).

In 2010, he was the guest of honor at the 10th Annual Piedmont Movie Festival.

== Death ==
A long time resident of the Cerveteri area of Rome, Ardisson died there at the age of 82 on 11 December 2014, after a long illness.

== Partial filmography ==
- You're on Your Own (1959) - Walter
- Morgan, the Pirate (1960)
- The Last of the Vikings (1961) - Guntar
- Hercules in the Haunted World (1961) - Teseo
- Erik the Conqueror (1961) - Erik
- Zorro in the Court of Spain (1962) - Riccardo Di Villa Verde / Zorro
- A Queen for Caesar (1962) - Achilles
- Twist, lolite e vitelloni (1962) - Massimo Mauri
- Katarsis (1963) - Gugo, the poet
- Grand Canyon Massacre (1964)
- The Long Hair of Death (1965) - Baron Kurt Humboldt
- Agent 3S3: Passport to Hell (1965) - Walter Ross, Agent 3S3
- Hercules and the Princess of Troy (1965, TV Movie) - Leander
- Juliet of the Spirits (1965) - Dolores' model
- Operation Counterspy (1965) - Lord George Moriston
- Agent 3S3: Massacre in the Sun (1966) - Walter Ross, Agent 3S3
- Countdown to Doomsday (1966) - Jeff Milton
- Date for a Murder (1967) - Vince Dreyser
- La lunga sfida (1967) - Patrick Gordon
- Either All or None (1968) - Amen / Johnny
- May God Forgive You... But I Won't (1968) - Cjamango McDonald
- Zorro the Fox (1968) - Don Diego di Alcantara / Zorro
- Una ragazza di Praga (1969) - Adam Kryl
- Django Defies Sartana (1970) - Sartana
- A Suitcase for a Corpse (1970) - Clive Ardington
- Chapaqua's Gold (1970) - Doc Harrison
- The Females (1970) - Tommy
- L'uomo più velenoso del cobra (1971) - Tony Garden
- La vergine di Bali (1972) - David Rank
- Sixteen (1973) - Giorgio
- Commissariato di notturna (1974) - Amedeo Furlan aka il Laureando
- La nipote (1974) - Piero / Luigi's friend
- Ciak si muore (1974) - Inspector Menzel
- Il torcinaso (1975) - Police Chief
- La guerre du pétrole n'aura pas lieu (1975) - Trudot
- Faccia di spia (1975) - Patrick
- Una vergine in famiglia (1975) - Ivan Fnrnesi
- Lo stallone (1975) - Guido, padre di Daniela
- L'ingenua (1975) - Piero Spazin
- Il signor Ministro li pretese tutti e subito (1977) - Pietro Santini
- Polizia selvaggia (1977)
- L'assassino speranza delle donne (1977)
- Eyes Behind the Stars (1978) - Agent for 'The Silencers'
- Supersexymarket (1979)
- Il viziaccio (1980)
- Las verdes vacaciones de una familia bien (1980) - Mario Nicosia
- Eroina (1980) - The Trafficant
- Carcerato (1981) - The Police Commissioner
- Don't Look in the Attic (1982) - Casati
- Pin il monello (1982)
- Apocalisse di un terremoto (1982) - Anthony Starace
- Amok (1983) - Le chef de la police
- La donna del mare (1984) - Alfred Wanfel
- I mercenari raccontano (1985)
- Cattivi Pierrot (1985) - Victim
- Delitti (1987) - Chief of Police
- La trasgressione (1987)
- Cross of the Seven Jewels (1987) - Boss from Sicily
- La tempesta (1988)
- La vendetta (1989) - Agent Roberts
- Viaggio di nozze in giallo (1990)
- Una donna da guardare (1991) - prof. Mueller
- Shadow Warriors (1992) - Ninja Master (final film role)
