= Orchidea De Santis =

Italian television and film actress

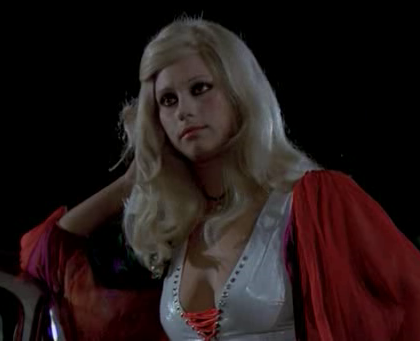
- De Santis in To Love Ophelia (1974)
- Born: 20 December 1948 (age 77); Bari, Italy
- Other name: Orchidea De Sanctis
- Website: http://www.orchideadesantis.it

Orchidea De Santis (born 20 December 1948) is an Italian television and film actress.

== Biography ==
Orchidea De Santis is an Italian actress in cinema, theatre and television. Her films include The Family Vice directed by Mariano Laurenti, To Love Ophelia by Flavio Mogherini, The Weekend Murders by Michele Lupo, Colpo di Stato by Luciano Salce (1969) and Paolo il caldo by Marco Vicario (1973). She appeared briefly in Il nero by Giovanni Vento (1965) and Rose Spot by Enzo Muzii (1969). Since the mid-1980s, her film work has declined in favor of other activities.

Her theater work includes comedies such as Morto un Papa se ne fa un altro, Strega Roma and Chicchignola written by Ettore Petrolini, all of which were directed by Ghigo De Chiara and Fiorenzo Fiorentini.

De Santis appeared in Sottoveste by Castellacci e Ventimiglia and Love and Life by Mike Immordino. She wrote and acted in La bambola Orchidea featuring the music of maestro Aldo Saitto, as well as Chicchignola with Mario Scaccia, and La cicogna si diverte by Carlo Alighero.

For the RAI radio, De Santis appeared in many roles, mainly in the serials Barocco a Roma and Racconto italiano which were broadcast in the late 1970s. In the 1989 she began working in the international broadcasting department where she produced Notturno italiano, AZ per gli italiani all'estero, Italia canta, Itinerari italiani, Facile ascolto.

She was producer of the radio show L'arca di Noè, and 13 episodes of Ciak si esegue. She also developed and produced a program about animals called L'anello di re Salomone. She is currently the director of, Due di notte.

Her television work includes Roosevelt (Rai 3, 1986), Maga Circe and Lucrezia Borgia (Rai 1, 1987) and Il caso Redoli, a TV series: The Great Trials (Rai Uno, 1996).

Outside of cinema and theater, she worked with the city government of Rome, organizing a review of 1970s Italian cinema called Italia (de)genere.

== Selected filmography ==
- Two Sons of Ringo (1966)
- How I Learned to Love Women (1966)
- Psychopath (1968)
- Rose Spot (1969)
- The Weekend Murders (1970)
- A Suitcase for a Corpse (1970)
- Invasion (1970)
- Seven Murders for Scotland Yard (1971)
- Le calde notti del Decameron (1972)
- The Ribald Decameron (1972)
- Le mille e una notte all'italiana (1972)
- Devil in the Brain (1972)
- Lady Dynamite (1973)
- Alla mia cara mamma nel giorno del suo compleanno (1974)
- To Love Ophelia (1974)
- Charley's Nieces (1974)
- La nipote (1974)
- The Sensual Man (1974)
- The Family Vice (1975)
- L'ingenua (1975)
- Le dolci zie (1975)
- Hurry... the Schoolgirls Are Coming (1975)
- Una bella governante di colore (1976)
- La dottoressa sotto il lenzuolo (1976)
- L'appuntamento (1977)
- Tre sotto il lenzuolo (1980)
- Arrivano i gatti (1980)
- Close Friends (1992)
