= Hurry... the Schoolgirls Are Coming =

- Written by: Giorgio Mille
- Screenplay by: Giorgio Mille
- Produced by: Claudio Perone
- Release date: 1975
- Language: Italian

Attenti... arrivano le collegiali! (English title: Hurry...the Schoolgirls Are Coming) is a 1975 commedia sexy all'italiana directed by Giorgio Mille (as George Miller).

== Premise ==
Female students of a private school arrive at a seaside hotel held by the parents of one of them.

== Cast ==
- Orchidea De Santis as Nadia
- Yvette Monet as Marina
- Toni Ucci as Marina's Father
- Eleonara Green as Sandra
- Enrica Saltutti as Carla
- Claudio Giorgi as Massimo

== Production ==
A 1979 version, including hardcore scenes, was released without agreement from the original cast. These additional footage scenes are said to have possibly been made with a different cast.

== Reception ==
A contemporary review in the Corriere della Sera was extremely critical of the film: "an abyss of abjection. Rarely, perhaps never, have we witnessed such a nauseating film. Nothing is spared the spectator, who feels cheated and rightly so; furthermore, there isn't even the excuse of beautiful women because those who are present in the film appear filthy and disproportionate, like a sideshow at a fair", an assessment quoted by the Italian film historian Marco Giusti, who added that the film was "highly interesting".

TV guide found it was an "unremarkable softcore entry (...) livened up somewhat in an alternate 1979 version containing hardcore footage."
