= Treasure Island in Outer Space =

1987 television miniseries

- DVD cover
- Genre: Science fiction
- Directed by: Antonio Margheriti
- Starring: Itaco Nardulli; Anthony Quinn; Ernest Borgnine; David Warbeck
- Composer: Gianfranco Plenizio
- Country of origin: Italy
- Original language: English
- No. of episodes: 5

Production
- Running time: 100 minutes each

Original release
- Network: Rai Due
- Release: 1987

Treasure Island in Outer Space (Italian: L'isola del tesoro) is a 1987 Italian science fiction television miniseries directed by Antonio Margheriti.

== Plot ==
It is based on the 1883 novel Treasure Island by Robert Louis Stevenson, setting the story in Italy and in space in the year 2300.

== Cast ==
- Itaco Nardulli : Gimmi Hawkins
- Anthony Quinn : Long John Silver
- Ernest Borgnine : Captain Billy 'Bill' Bones
- David Warbeck : Dr. Livesey
- Philippe Leroy : Count Ravano
- Klaus Löwitsch : Cap. Smollett
- Andy Luotto : Ben Gunn
- Giovanni Lombardo Radice : Hands
- Enzo Cerusico : Vougest
- Ida Di Benedetto : Mother of Jim
- Biagio Pelligra : Pew, the blind man

== Production ==
The series was produced by RAI (Radiotelevisione Italiana) and directed by Antonio Margheriti under the pen name Anthony M. Dawson. It is the biggest sci-fi production of Italian television.

The miniseries of 5 episodes of 100 minutes was originally aired in Italy from November 19, 1987, on RAI Due channel. It was also adapted as a 120-minute film. The miniseries is also known as Space Island (UK and Norway, USA on VHS) and Der Schatz im All (Germany).

== See also ==
- List of Italian television series
- Treasure Planet (Disney animated film)
