= The Sensuous Nurse =

1975 film by Nello Rossati

- Italian theatrical release poster
- Directed by: Nello Rossati
- Written by: Nello Rossati; Paolo Vidali; Claudia Florio; Roberto Gianviti
- Produced by: Carlo Ponti
- Starring: Ursula Andress; Duilio Del Prete
- Cinematography: Ennio Guarnieri
- Edited by: Albert Gallitti
- Music by: Gianfranco Plenizio
- Distributed by: Interfilm Italia
- Release date: 1975
- Running time: 101 minutes
- Country: Italy
- Language: Italian

The Sensuous Nurse (Italian: L'Infermiera) is a 1975 commedia sexy all'italiana film directed by Nello Rossati and starring Ursula Andress and Duilio Del Prete. It features two Bond girls, Andress and Luciana Paluzzi. A sexually-provocative film, it regularly aired on late night cable television during the 1970s and 1980s. The film is also known by the English titles I Will If You Will, The Nurse, The Secrets of a Sensuous Nurse, and Nurse Anna.

== Plot ==
Leonida Bottacin is an aging widower who owns a successful winery in Italy. While having sex with another man's wife, Leonida has a heart attack and falls into a coma. His heirs go to stay at his villa. The heirs include Leonida's nephew Gustavo; Leonida's niece Italia and her husband Benito; and Leonida's niece Jole and her son Adone. Besides Adone, none of them like Leonida.

Leonida has not been interested in selling the winery, but Benito wants to take over and sell it to American business interests for a lot of money. However, while Leonida is still alive, the deal cannot be made. Benito assures the American Mr. Kitch that Leonida will die soon.

Leonida keeps living, though a doctor says that a second heart attack would be fatal. Benito visits his ex-girlfriend Anna, a seductive Swiss nurse, and hires her to attend to Leonida. Benito hopes that Leonida will be sufficiently excited by Anna to suffer another heart attack. Gustavo, Jole, and Italia are also in on the plan. Benito continues his ongoing sexual liaisons with both Anna and Jole.

Eventually, Leonida awakens from his coma. Benito urges Anna to be more sexual with Leonida. However, Anna acts professionally and rebuffs Leonida's advances. Leonida starts to recover his health.

Adone, who has a crush on Anna, catches Benito and Anna together and overhears them talking about their plan to kill Leonida. Adone becomes angry at Anna. Trying to find out what he knows, Anna seduces Adone. Despite his anger, Adone gives in to temptation and has sex with Anna. Afterward, Anna tells him that she had no intention of actually killing Leonida.

Kitch loses his patience and informs Benito that the deal is off. Anna and Adone work together to expose the heirs' deadly plan to Leonida, who subsequently kicks his relatives out of the villa.

Leonida and Anna fall in love, get married, and go on their honeymoon. That night, Leonida tries to initiate sex with Anna, but she says that he still needs time to recover. However, Leonida is unable to resist the attractive woman. They have sex, and Leonida suffers a heart attack and dies as a result. From the grave, Leonida says he has no regrets.

== Cast ==
- Ursula Andress as Anna
- Duilio Del Prete as Benito Varotto
- Mario Pisu as Leonida Bottacin
- Daniele Vargas as Gustavo Scarpa
- Jack Palance as Mr. Kitch
- Luciana Paluzzi as Jole Scarpa
- Stefano Sabelli as Adone Scarpa
- Carla Romanelli as Tosca Floria Zanin
- Lino Toffolo as Giovanni Garbin
- Marina Confalone as Italia Varotto
- Attilio Duse as Doctor Pavan

== Production ==
The film was produced by Carlo Ponti's Compagnia Cinematografica Champion. Its working title was La seduttrice ('The seducer'). It was shot between Venice and Vittorio Veneto.

== Reception ==
Domestically, the film was a massive success, grossing over 2,1 billion lire.
