= Django Strikes Again =

1987 film by Nello Rossati

Django Strikes Again (Django 2 - Il grande ritorno)
- Italian film poster by Enzo Sciotti
- Directed by: Ted Archer
- Screenplay by: Franco Reggiani; Nello Rossati; Dialogue: Anna Miserocchi
- Story by: Franco Reggiani; Nello Rossati
- Based on: Django by Sergio Corbucci
- Produced by: Luciano Martino (uncredited)
- Starring: Franco Nero; Christopher Connelly; Licia Lee Lyon; William Berger; Donald Pleasence
- Cinematography: Sandro Mancori
- Edited by: Adalberto Ceccarelli
- Music by: Gianfranco Plenizio
- Production companies: National Cinematografica; Dania Film; Filmes International; Reteitalia
- Distributed by: DMV Distribuzione; Surf Film
- Release date: 6 November 1987
- Running time: 88 minutes
- Country: Italy
- Languages: Italian; English

Django Strikes Again (Italian: Django 2 - Il grande ritorno, lit. "Django 2 - The Great Return") is a 1987 Italian spaghetti Western film directed by Nello Rossati, under the pseudonym "Ted Archer". It stars Franco Nero as the title character in a story set 20 years after the first film, and it is the only official sequel in the Django series.

== Synopsis ==
Twenty years after the events in the first Django, the eponymous deadly gunslinger has left his violent life behind and become a monk named Brother Ignatius. Living in seclusion in a monastery, he learns from a dying former lover that he has a young daughter, who has been kidnapped along with other children by a ruthless Hungarian aristocrat, arms dealer and slave trader known as El Diablo (The Devil) Orlowsky. The children and other prisoners are exploited working in Orlowsky's silver mine, from which he hopes to get rich from the spoils. Determined to rescue his daughter, Django goes to war against Orlowsky's private mercenary army.

== Cast ==
- Franco Nero as Django / Brother Ignatius
- Christopher Connelly as "El Diablo" Orlowsky / Prince Orlowsky
- Donald Pleasence as Ben Gunn
- Licinia Lentini (credited as Licia Lee Lyon) as Countess Isabelle
- Roberto Posse (credited as Robert Posse) as German Diablo Henchman
- Alessandro Di Chio as Captain
- Rodrigo Obregón as Diablo Henchman
- Miguel Carreno (credited as Micky) as Local Boy
- William Berger as Old Gunfighter
- Bill Moore as Old Gunfighter
- Consuelo Reina as Dona Gabriela

== Production ==
Django Strikes Again was conceived concurrently with Duccio Tessari's Tex and the Lord of the Deep; both projects were intended to represent a revival of the Spaghetti Western genre. Following the commercial failure of Tex, Sergio Corbucci, who had co-written Django Strikes Again and had initially agreed to direct it, refused to partake in its production. Shot on location in Colombia, the film represents the final screen appearance of Christopher Connelly, who died of cancer a year after its release. Nero stated in a 2012 interview that he is "not happy with the film" and called it "a bit flat".

== Release ==
Django Strikes Again was released theatrically in West Germany on November 6, 1987 as Djangos Rückkehr.

== Sequel ==
Following a 2014 attempt to mount the project, it was reported in May 2016 that Franco Nero would reprise his role in a third and final outing as the titular character, entitled Django Lives!; the film was to be set 50 years after the events of the original installment, and John Sayles was attached to write the screenplay and direct.
