= To Love Ophelia =

- Italian theatrical release poster by Renato Casaro
- Directed by: Flavio Mogherini
- Cinematography: Carlo Carlini
- Music by: Jacopo Fiastri; Riz Ortolani; German Weiss
- Release date: 1974
- Country: Italy
- Language: Italian

Per amare Ofelia (internationally released as To Love Ophelia) is a 1974 Italian comedy film directed by Flavio Mogherini.

It is the debut film of Renato Pozzetto, and for his performance he won a Silver Ribbon for Best New Actor.

== Plot ==
The young Orlando feels like he is still a child, terrorized by the outside world, and stuck in relations with girls. He has an obsessive attraction for a beautiful and still young mother. Anything regarding a normal man of his age is unknown to Orlando; particularly sex. One day, he rescues Ofelia, a former prostitute in love with him who will solve his problem.

== Cast ==
- Giovanna Ralli: Ofelia
- Renato Pozzetto: Orlando
- Françoise Fabian: Federica
- Maurizio Arena: Spartaco
- Didi Perego: Nun
- Alberto de Mendoza: Lawyer
- Orchidea De Santis: Prostitute
- Rossana Di Lorenzo: Iris
- George Rigaud: Nane

== See also ==
- List of Italian films of 1974
