= Terror in the Crypt =

1964 film by Camillo Mastrocinque

- Italian film poster
- Italian: La cripta e l’incubo
- Directed by: Camillo Mastrocinque
- Screenplay by: Tonino Valerii; Ernesto Gastaldi
- Based on: Carmilla (1872 novel) by Joseph Sheridan Le Fanu
- Produced by: Marco Mariani
- Starring: Christopher Lee; Adriana Ambesi; Pier Anna Quaglia; Jose Campos; Vera Valmont
- Cinematography: Julio Ortas; Giuseppe Aquari
- Edited by: Roberto Cinquini
- Music by: Carlo Savina
- Production company: MEC Cinematografica; E.I. Associates; Hispamer Films; Alta Vista
- Distributed by: MEC Cinematografica (Italy)
- Release dates: 27 May 1964 (Italy); 1 August 1966 (Spain)
- Running time: 85 Min
- Countries: Italy; Spain
- Language: Italian
- Box office: ₤69.541 million

Terror in the Crypt (Italian: La cripta e l’incubo, lit. 'The Crypt and the Nightmare', also released as Crypt of the Vampire and Crypt of Horror) is a 1964 gothic horror film directed by Camillo Mastrocinque and starring Christopher Lee, Adriana Ambesi, Ursula Davis and José Campos. It is based on the 1872 novel Carmilla by Sheridan Le Fanu. An Italian and Spanish co-production, the film was released on May 27, 1964.

== Plot ==
In the ancient Karnstein castle lives Count Ludwig and his daughter Laura, who is plagued by constant nightmares. To dispel the suspicion that his daughter has been reincarnated as a Karnstein ancestor, the Count summons a young scholar, Klauss, to the castle. Klauss is retained to uncover the connection between Laura's nightmares and the death of a person from her dream. Klauss studies the ancient parchments and seems to have found a clue, but just as he is about to unravel the mystery, Count Ludwig forbids him from continuing.

The halt in the search leads to a series of murders: first that of a scary old storyteller, then that of a young maid, followed by Laura's old nurse.

A young woman and her mother are traveling by their land. They have a small accident and it is reported that the young woman is ill, and in need of care. She stays with Laura at the castle to recuperate. Miss Ljuba and Laura become very close.

At this point, the Count's reservations for Klauss investigation are shattered. Klauss feverishly resumes his research, and the horrific mystery of long ago, is finally solved.

== Cast ==
- Christopher Lee as Count Ludwig Karnstein
- Adriana Ambesi as Laura / Sheena Karnstein
- Ursula Davis as Ljuba
- José Campos as Friedrich Klauss
- Véra Valmont as Annette
- Angela Minervini as Tilde Karnstein
- Carla Calò as Ljuba's mother
- Nela Conjiu as Rowena
- José Villasante as Cedric, the majordomo
- John Karlsen as Franz Karnstein (uncredited)

== Production ==
Terror in the Crypt was the third film adaptation of the novel Carmilla, following Carl Theodor Dreyer's Vampyr (1932) and Roger Vadim's Blood and Roses (1960).

According to Tonino Valerii, the script was written in three days, while Gastaldi stated that it was written in 24 hours. Gastaldi has also claimed that he lied to a producer that they had a script ready, and then returned home to pen the script to return to the producer with the following day. The original title of the script was entitled La maledizione dei Karnstein (lit.: "The Curse of the Karnsteins").

The film was originally going to be directed by Antonio Margheriti. Due to other commitments, the film was given to Camillo Mastrocinque to direct. Mastrocinque was more prominently known for his comedy films, and was suggested by agent Liliana Biancini in order to help find the director new work. Valerii was also the assistant director on set, and later claimed that he personally shot several scenes of the film.

The film was shot at Castello Piccolomini in Balsorano, Abruzzo.

== Release ==
Terror in the Crypt was released in Italy on 27 May 1964 where it was distributed by MEC. It grossed a total of 69.541 million Italian lire. Terror in the Crypt was released straight to television in the United States by AIP-TV as Crypt of the Vampire. It was released theatrically in the United Kingdom as Crypt of Horror.

=== Home media ===
The film was released on DVD in 2012 by Retromedia/Image in the United States where it retains the title Crypt of the Vampire, while the credits in the film call it Terror in the Crypt. It was released by on Blu-Ray by Severin Films on January 31, 2023.

== Reception ==
In a contemporary review The Monthly Film Bulletin wrote: "This is occasionally quite atmospheric, with an effective climax and some nice shots of the castle battlements by moonlight and so forth. For the rest, though, it is slow and static, indifferently acted and directed, and poorly dubbed."

== See also ==
- Christopher Lee filmography
- List of horror films of 1964
- List of Italian films of 1964
- List of Spanish films of 1964
