= Christopher Lee filmography =

List of films featuring Christopher Lee

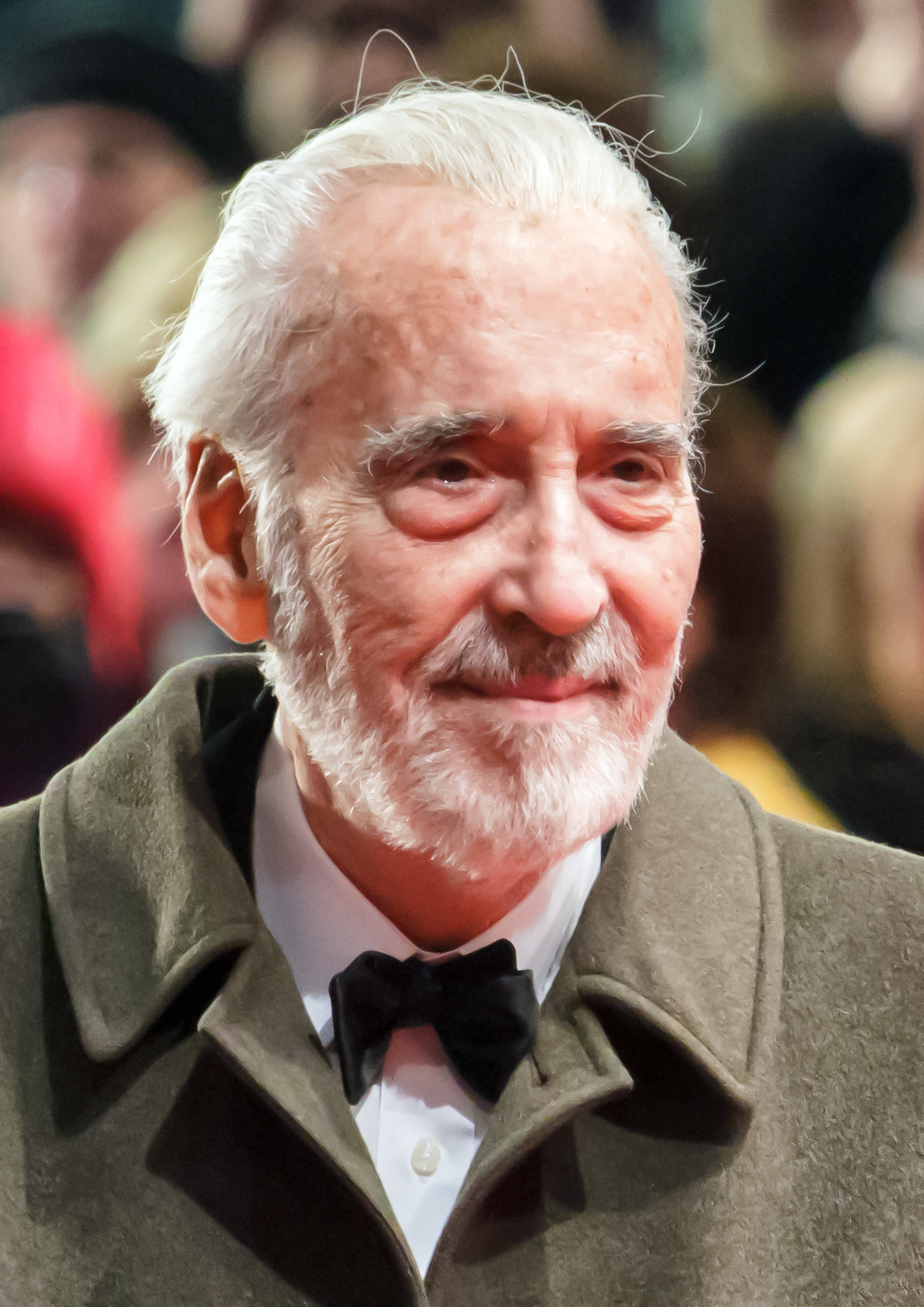
Lee at the 2013 Berlin Film Festival

The following is the filmography of English actor Sir Christopher Lee (27 May 1922 – 7 June 2015).

With a career spanning nearly seven decades, Lee was a credited actor in at least 266 feature theatrical films. He was well known for portraying Count Dracula in a sequence of Hammer Horror films, beginning with Dracula (1958). His other film roles include Francisco Scaramanga in the James Bond action film The Man with the Golden Gun (1974), Count Dooku in the Star Wars prequel trilogy (2002–2005), and Saruman in The Lord of the Rings film trilogy (2001–2003) and The Hobbit film trilogy (2012–2014).

Lee was knighted for services to drama and charity in 2009. He received the BAFTA Fellowship in 2011 and the BFI Fellowship in 2013. He considered his best performance to be that of Muhammad Ali Jinnah in the biopic Jinnah (1998), and his best film to be the British cult film The Wicker Man (1973). He frequently appeared opposite his friend Peter Cushing in numerous horror films, and late in his career had roles in five Tim Burton films.

== Film ==
Year	Title	Role	Notes
1948	Corridor of Mirrors	Charles	
1948	One Night with You	Pirelli's Assistant	
1948	Hamlet	Spear Carrier	Uncredited
1948	A Song for Tomorrow	Auguste	
1948	Penny and the Pownall Case	Jonathan Blair	
1948	My Brother's Keeper	Second Constable	Scenes deleted
1948	Saraband for Dead Lovers	Bit Part	Uncredited
1948	Scott of the Antarctic	Bernard Day	
1949	Trottie True	Honourable Bongo Icklesham	
1950	They Were Not Divided	Chris Lewis	
1950	Prelude to Fame	Newsman	
1951	Captain Horatio Hornblower	Spanish Captain	
1951	Valley of Eagles	Detective Holt	
1951	Quo Vadis	Chariot Driver	Uncredited
1952	The Crimson Pirate	Joseph	Uncredited
1952	Top Secret	Russian Agent	Uncredited
1952	Paul Temple Returns	Sir Felix Raybourne	
1952	Babes in Bagdad	Slave Dealer	
1952	Moulin Rouge	Georges Seurat	Uncredited
1953	Les Vacances de Monsieur Hulot	Unknown (voice)	Uncredited
1953	Innocents in Paris	Lieutenant Whitlock	Uncredited
1954	Destination Milan	Svenson	
1955	Cross-Roads	Harry Cooper	Short film
1955	That Lady	Captain	
1955	Final Column	Larry Spence	Archive footage
1955	Man in Demand	Martell	Archive footage
1955	Contraband Spain	Narrator	Uncredited
1955	The Dark Avenger	French Patrol Captain at Tavern	Uncredited
1955	The Cockleshell Heroes	Lt Cdr Dick Raikes, RN	
1955	Alias John Preston	John Preston	
1955	Police Dog	Police Constable Johnny	
1955	Storm Over the Nile	Karaga Pasha	
1956	Private's Progress	Major Schultz	Uncredited
1956	Alexander the Great	Nectenabus (voice)	Uncredited
1956	Port Afrique	Franz Vermes	
1956	Beyond Mombasa	Gil Rossi	
1956	The Battle of the River Plate	Manolo	
1957	Ill Met by Moonlight	German Officer at Dentist's	
1957	Fortune Is a Woman	Charles Highbury	
1957	The Traitor	Dr Neumann	
1957	The Curse of Frankenstein	The Creature	
1957	Manuela	Unknown (voice)	Uncredited
1957	Bitter Victory	Sgt Barney	
1957	The Truth About Women	Francois Thiers	
1958	A Tale of Two Cities	Marquis St Evremonde	
1958	Dracula	Count Dracula	Alternative title: Horror of Dracula
1958	Battle of the V-1	Brunner	
1958	Corridors of Blood	Resurrection Joe	
1959	The Hound of the Baskervilles	Sir Henry Baskerville	
1959	The Man Who Could Cheat Death	Pierre Gerard	
1959	The Treasure of San Teresa	Jaeger	
1959	The Mummy	Kharis / The Mummy	
1959	Uncle Was a Vampire	Baron Roderico da Frankurten	
1960	Too Hot to Handle	Novak	
1960	The Two Faces of Dr. Jekyll	Paul Allen	Alternative titles: House of Fright and Jekyll's Inferno
1960	Beat Girl	Kenny King	Alternative title: Wild for Kicks
1960	The City of the Dead	Prof. Alan Driscoll	Alternative title: Horror Hotel
1960	The Hands of Orlac	Nero the magician	
1961	The Terror of the Tongs	Chung King	
1961	Taste of Fear	Doctor Pierre Gerrard	
1961	The Devil's Daffodil	Ling Chu	
1961	Hercules in the Haunted World	King Lico (Licos)	Alternative title: Ercole al centro della terra
1962	The Puzzle of the Red Orchid	Captain Allerman	Alternative title: The Secret of the Red Orchid
1962	The Pirates of Blood River	Captain LaRoche	
1962	The Devil's Agent	Baron von Staub	
1962	Sherlock Holmes and the Deadly Necklace	Sherlock Holmes	
1963	Katarsis	Mephistopheles	Alternative title: Challenge the Devil
1963	The Virgin of Nuremberg	Erich	Alternative titles: Castle of Terror and La vergine di Norimberga
1963	La frusta e il corpo	Kurt Menliff	Alternative titles: The Whip and the Body and Night Is the Phantom
1964	Terror in the Crypt	Count Ludwig Karnstein	Alternative titles: Crypt of the Vampire and Crypt of Horror
1964	The Devil-Ship Pirates	Captain Robeles	
1964	Il castello dei morti vivi	Count Drago	Alternative title: Castle of the Living Dead
1964	The Gorgon	Prof. Karl Meister	
1965	Dr Terror's House of Horrors	Franklyn Marsh	Segment: "Disembodied Hand"
1965	She	Billali	
1965	The Face of Fu Manchu	Dr Fu Manchu	
1965	The Skull	Sir Matthew Phillips	
1965	Ten Little Indians	Mr UN Owen (voice)	Uncredited
1966	Dracula: Prince of Darkness	Count Dracula	
1966	Rasputin, the Mad Monk	Grigori Rasputin	
1966	Circus of Fear	Gregor	Alternative title: Psycho Circus
1966	The Brides of Fu Manchu	Dr Fu Manchu	
1967	Five Golden Dragons	Dragon No 4	
1967	The Vengeance of Fu Manchu	Dr Fu Manchu	
1967	Night of the Big Heat	Godfrey Hanson	
1967	Theatre of Death	Philippe Darvas	
1967	The Blood Demon	Count Frederic Regula / Graf von Andomai	Alternative titles: Die Schlangengrube Und Das Pendel and The Torture Chamber of Dr Sadism
1968	Eve	Colonel Stuart	Alternative title: The Face of Eve
1968	The Devil Rides Out	Duc de Richleau	Alternative title: The Devil's Bride
1968	The Blood of Fu Manchu	Dr Fu Manchu	
1968	Dracula Has Risen from the Grave	Count Dracula	
1968	Curse of the Crimson Altar	Morley	Alternative title: The Crimson Cult
1969	The Castle of Fu Manchu	Dr Fu Manchu	
1969	Eugenie... The Story of Her Journey into Perversion	Dolmance	
1969	The Oblong Box	Dr J Neuhart	
1969	The Magic Christian	Ship's Vampire	
1970	Scream and Scream Again	Fremont	
1970	The Bloody Judge	Lord George Jeffreys	Alternative title: Night of the Blood Monster
1970	Count Dracula	Count Dracula	
1970	Taste the Blood of Dracula	Count Dracula	
1970	Julius Caesar	Artemidorus	
1970	One More Time	The Vampire	Cameo
1970	The Private Life of Sherlock Holmes	Mycroft Holmes	
1970	Scars of Dracula	Count Dracula	
1971	The House That Dripped Blood	John Reid	Segment: "Sweets to the Sweet"
1971	Cuadecuc, vampir	Count Dracula / Himself	
1971	I, Monster	Dr Charles Marlowe / Mr Edward Blake	
1971	Hannie Caulder	Bailey	
1972	Umbracle	The Man	
1972	Dracula A.D. 1972	Count Dracula	
1972	Horror Express	Sir Alexander Saxton	
1972	Death Line	Stratton-Villiers, MI5	Alternative title: Raw Meat
1973	Nothing but the Night	Col. Charles Bingham	
1973	The Creeping Flesh	James Hildern	
1973	The Satanic Rites of Dracula	Count Dracula	
1973	The Wicker Man	Lord Summerisle	
1973	The Three Musketeers	Rochefort	
1974	Dark Places	Dr Mandeville	
1974	The Four Musketeers	Rochefort	
1974	The Man with the Golden Gun	Francisco Scaramanga	
1975	Le boucher, la star et l'orpheline	Van Krig / Himself	
1975	In Search of Dracula	Narrator	
1975	Diagnosis Murder	Stephen Hayward	
1975	The Story of Heidi	Unknown (voice)	English dub
1976	Killer Force	Major Chilton	Alternative title: The Diamond Mercenaries
1976	To the Devil, A Daughter	Father Michael Rayner	
1976	Albino	Bill	Alternative titles: Whispering Death and Death in the Sun
1976	Dracula père et fils	The Prince of Darkness	Alternative title: Dracula and Son
1976	The Keeper	The Keeper	
1977	Airport '77	Martin Wallace	
1977	Meatcleaver Massacre	Narrator / Himself	Alternative titles: Evil Force and Revenge of the Dead
1977	End of the World	Father Pergado / Zindar	
1977	Starship Invasions	Captain Rameses	
1978	Circle of Iron	Zetan	Alternative title: The Silent Flute
1978	Return from Witch Mountain	Victor Gannon	
1978	Caravans	Sardar Khan	
1979	The Passage	Gypsy	
1979	Captain America II: Death Too Soon	General Miguel	
1979	Nutcracker Fantasy	Various voices	
1979	Arabian Adventure	Alquazar	
1979	Jaguar Lives!	Adam Caine	
1979	Bear Island	Lechinski	
1979	1941	Capt. Wolfgang von Kleinschmidt	
1980	Serial	Luckman Skull	
1980	Safari 3000	Count Borgia	
1981	An Eye for an Eye	Morgan Canfield	
1981	Desperate Moves	Carl Boxer	
1981	The Salamander	Prince Baldasar	
1982	The Last Unicorn	King Haggard (voice)	
1983	House of the Long Shadows	Corrigan	
1983	The Return of Captain Invincible	Mr Midnight	
1983	New Magic	Mr Kellar	Short film
1984	The Rosebud Beach Hotel	Clifford King	
1984	The Bengal Lancers!	Sir James Hunter	Unfinished film
1985	Howling II: Your Sister Is a Werewolf	Stefan Crosscoe	
1985	Mask of Murder	Chief Superintendent Jonathan Rich	
1986	Jocks	President White	
1987	Mio min Mio	Kato	
1987	The Girl	Peter Storm	
1988	Dark Mission	Luis Morel	
1988	Olympus Force: The Key	Filly	
1989	The Return of the Musketeers	Rochefort	
1989	La Révolution française	Sanson	Segment: "Années Terribles, Les"
1989	La chute des aigles	Walter Strauss	
1989	Murder Story	Willard Hope	
1989	Honeymoon Academy	Lazos	
1990	L'avaro	Cardinale Spinosi	
1990	Gremlins 2: The New Batch	Doctor Catheter	
1990	The Rainbow Thief	Uncle Rudolf	
1991	Kabuto	King Philip	
1991	Curse III: Blood Sacrifice	Doctor Pearson	Alternative title: Panga
1992	Jackpot	Cedric	
1994	Funny Man	Callum Chance	
1994	Police Academy: Mission to Moscow	Commandant Alexander Nikolaevich Rakov	
1994	A Feast at Midnight	VE Longfellow	
1994	Flesh and Blood	Narrator / Himself	Documentary film
1996	The Stupids	Mr Sender	
1996	Welcome to the Discworld	Death (voice)	Short film
1998	Tale of the Mummy	Sir Richard Turkel	
1998	Jinnah	Muhammad Ali Jinnah	
1999	Sleepy Hollow	Burgomaster	
2001	The Lord of the Rings: The Fellowship of the Ring	Saruman	
2002	Star Wars: Episode II – Attack of the Clones	Count Dooku	
2002	The Lord of the Rings: The Two Towers	Saruman	
2003	The Lord of the Rings: The Return of the King	Saruman	Extended Edition only
2004	Crimson Rivers II: Angels of the Apocalypse	Heinrich von Garten	
2005	Star Wars: Episode III – Revenge of the Sith	Count Dooku	
2005	Charlie and the Chocolate Factory	Dr Wilbur Wonka	
2005	The Adventures of Greyfriars Bobby	The Lord Provost	
2005	Corpse Bride	Pastor Galswells (voice)	
2007	The Golden Compass	First High Councillor	
2008	Star Wars: The Clone Wars	Count Dooku (voice)	
2009	Boogie Woogie	Alfred Rhinegold	
2009	The Heavy	Mr Mason	
2009	Triage	Joaquín Morales	
2009	Glorious 39	Walter	
2010	Alice in Wonderland	Jabberwocky (voice)	Cameo
2010	Burke & Hare	Joseph	
2011	Season of the Witch	Cardinal d’Ambroise	
2011	The Resident	August	
2011	The Wicker Tree	Old Gentleman	
2011	Grave Tales	Himself	Cameo
2011	Hugo	Monsieur Labisse	
2012	Dark Shadows	Silas Clarney	
2012	The Hobbit: An Unexpected Journey	Saruman	
2013	Night Train to Lisbon	Father Bartolomeu	
2013	Extraordinary Tales	Narrator	Segment: "The Fall of the House of Usher"
2013	The Girl from Nagasaki	Old Officer Pinkerton	
2013	Necessary Evil: Super-Villains of DC Comics	Narrator	Documentary film
2014	The Hobbit: The Battle of the Five Armies	Saruman	Final live-action role and final work released in his lifetime
2016	Angels in Notting Hill	God / Mr President (voice)	Posthumous release
2017	The Hunting of the Snark	Narrator	Short film; posthumous release
2024	The Lord of the Rings: The War of the Rohirrim	Saruman (voice)	Archival recording; posthumous release

== Television ==
Year	Title	Role	Notes
1953–1956	Douglas Fairbanks Presents	Various roles	13 episodes
1955	Moby Dick—Rehearsed	A Stage Manager / Flask	Television film
1955	The Vise	Various roles	3 episodes
1955	Tales of Hans Anderson	Various roles	2 episodes
1956	Chevron of Fallen Stars	Governor	Episode: "Captain Kidd"
1956	The Scarlet Pimpernel	Louis	Uncredited; Episode: "The Elusive Chauvelin"
1956	Colonel March of Scotland Yard	Jean-Pierre	Episode: "At Night All Cats Are Grey"
1956	Sailor of Fortune	Various roles	2 episodes
1956	The Adventures of Aggie	Inspector Hollis	Episode: "Cut Glass"
1956–1957	Assignment Foreign Legion	Various roles	2 episodes
1957	The Errol Flynn Theatre	Various roles	4 episodes
1957	The Gay Cavalier	Colonel Jeffries	Episode: "The Lady's Dilemma"
1958	OSS	Dessinger	Episode: "Operation Firefly"
1958	Ivanhoe	Sir Otto	Episode: "The German Knight"
1958	White Hunter	Mark Caldwell	Episode: "This Hungry Hell"
1959	The Adventures of William Tell	Prince Erik	Episode: "Manhunt"
1960	Tales of the Vikings	Norman Knight	Episode: "The Bull"
1961	Alcoa Presents One Step Beyond	Wilhelm Reitlinger	Episode: "The Sorcerer"
1964	The Alfred Hitchcock Hour	Karl Jorla	Episode: "The Sign of Satan"
1967	The Avengers	Professor Stone	Episode: "Never, Never Say Die"
1969	The Avengers	Colonel Mannering	Episode: "The Interrogators"
1969	Light Entertainment Killers	Unknown	Television film
1971	Theatre Macabre	Self — Host	Season 1 of Theatre Macabre premiered on October 1, 1971.
1973	Poor Devil	Lucifer	
1973	Orson Welles Great Mysteries	Arnaud	Episode: "The Leather Funnel"
1976	Space: 1999	Captain Zandor	Episode: "Earthbound"
1978	How the West Was Won	The Grand Duke	2 episodes
1978	The Pirate	Samir Al Fay	Television film
1978	Saturday Night Live	Himself (host)	Episode: "Christopher Lee/Meat Loaf"
1979	Captain America II: Death Too Soon	General Miguel	Television film
1980	Once Upon a Spy	Marcus Valorium	Television film
1980	Charlie's Angels	Dale Woodman	Episode: "Angel in Hiding"
1981	Evil Stalks This House	Host	Television film
1981	Goliath Awaits	John McKenzie	Television film
1982	Massarati and the Brain	Victor Leopold	Television film
1982	Charles & Diana: A Royal Love Story	Prince Philip	Television film
1984	The Far Pavilions	Kaka-ji Rao	3 episodes
1984	Faerie Tale Theatre	King Vladimir V	Episode: "The Boy Who Left Home to Find Out About the Shivers"
1986	Un métier du seigneur	Fog	Television film
1986	The Disputation	King James I of Aragon	Television film
1986	Shaka Zulu	Lord Bathurst	10 episodes
1989	Around the World in 80 Days	Stuart	3 episodes
1989	La Révolution française	Sanson	Segment: "Les Années Terribles"
1990	The Care of Time	Karlis Zander	Television film
1990	Treasure Island	Blind Pew	Television film
1991	Sherlock Holmes and the Leading Lady	Sherlock Holmes	Television film
1992	Incident at Victoria Falls	Sherlock Holmes	Television film
1992	Beauty and the Beast	Monsieur Renard (voice)	Television film
1992	The Young Indiana Jones Chronicles	Count Ottokar Graf Czerin	Episode: "Austria, March 1917"
1992	Double Vision	Mr. Bernard	Television film
1993	Death Train	General Konstantin Benin	Television film
1995	The Tomorrow People	Rameses	Serial: "The Rameses Connection"
1995	Moses	Ramesses II	Television film
1995	Tales of Mystery and Imagination	Himself (host)	2 episodes
1996	Alisea and the Dream Prince	Azaret	Mini-series
1996	100 Years of Horror	Himself (host)	26 episodes
1997	Ivanhoe	Lucas de Beaumanoir	4 episodes
1997	Soul Music	Death (voice)	7 episodes
1997	Wyrd Sisters	Death (voice)	6 episodes
1997	The Odyssey	Tiresias	2 episodes
1997	The New Adventures of Robin Hood	Olwyn	6 episodes
2000	Gormenghast	Flay	4 episodes
2000	In the Beginning	Rameses I	Television film
2000	A Ghost Story for Christmas	M. R. James	Episode: "The Stalls of Barchester"
2001	Les Redoutables	Death	Segment: "Confession"
2005	Pope John Paul II	Cardinal Stefan Wyszyński	2 episodes
2008	The Colour of Magic	Death (voice)	2 episodes

== Video games ==
Year	Title	Voice role	Notes
1994	Ghosts	Dr Marcus Grimalkin / Himself	
1999	The Rocky Interactive Horror Show	Narrator	
2001	Conquest: Frontier Wars	Anvil / Headquarters	
2003	Freelancer	Narrator	
2003	The Lord of the Rings: The Return of the King	Saruman	
2004	EverQuest II	Lucan D'Lere	
2004	GoldenEye: Rogue Agent	Francisco Scaramanga	
2005	The Lord of the Rings: The Third Age	Saruman	
2005	The Lord of the Rings: The Battle for Middle-earth	Saruman	
2006	Kingdom Hearts II	DiZ / Ansem the Wise	
2006	The Lord of the Rings: The Battle for Middle-earth II	Saruman	
2007	Kingdom Hearts II Final Mix	DiZ / Ansem the Wise	Archive footage
2008	The Lord of the Rings: The Battle for Middle-earth II: The Rise of the Witch-king	Saruman	
2009	Kingdom Hearts 358/2 Days	DiZ	
2014	Lego The Hobbit	Saruman / Narrator	
2014	Kingdom Hearts HD 2.5 Remix	DiZ / Ansem the Wise	Archive footage
2015	Deus Ex Machina 2	The Programmer / Narrator	
2017	Kingdom Hearts HD 1.5 + 2.5 Remix	DiZ / Ansem the Wise	Archive footage

== Theatre ==
Year	Title	Role	Notes
1947	The Constant Nymph	Roberto	Connaught Theatre, Worthing
1948	Design for Living	Henry Carver	Connaught Theatre, Worthing
1948	As You Like It	Jaques de Boys / First Lord	Connaught Theatre, Worthing
1949	Wishing Well	John Pugh	Connaught Theatre, Worthing
1949	See Naples and Die	Angelo de Medici	Connaught Theatre, Worthing

== Audiobooks ==
Year	Title
1994	The Exorcist
1998	The Adventure of the Sussex Vampire and Other Stories
2000	The Adventure of the Lion's Mane and Other Stories
2007	The Children of Húrin
2009	Dracula
2009	Frankenstein
2009	Phantom of the Opera
2010	The Hunchback of Notre-Dame
2010	Dr Jekyll & Mr Hyde

== Awards and nominations ==
No.	Year	Nominated work	Award	Results
1	1973	The Wicker Man	Saturn Award for Best Actor	Nominated
2	1979	Arabian Adventure	Saturn Award for Best Actor	Nominated
3	2001	The Lord of the Rings: The Fellowship of the Ring	Phoenix Film Critics Society Award for Best Cast	Won
4	2001	The Lord of the Rings: The Fellowship of the Ring	MTV Movie Award for Best Fight (shared with Ian McKellen)	Nominated
5	2001	The Lord of the Rings: The Fellowship of the Ring	MTV Movie Award for Best Villain	Nominated
6	2001	The Lord of the Rings: The Fellowship of the Ring	Screen Actors Guild Award for Outstanding Performance by a Cast in a Motion Picture	Nominated
7	2002	Star Wars: Episode II – Attack of the Clones	MTV Movie Award for Best Fight	Won
8	2002	The Lord of the Rings: The Two Towers	Online Film Critics Society Award for Best Cast	Won
9	2002	The Lord of the Rings: The Two Towers	Phoenix Film Critics Society Award for Best Cast	Won
10	2002	The Lord of the Rings: The Two Towers	Screen Actors Guild Award for Outstanding Performance by a Cast in a Motion Picture	Nominated
11	2010	Alice in Wonderland	Teen Choice Award for Movie – Choice Fight (shared with Mia Wasikowska)	Won
12	2011	Hugo	Washington D.C. Area Film Critics Association Award for Best Cast	Nominated
