= Rossana Di Lorenzo =

Italian actress (1938–2022)

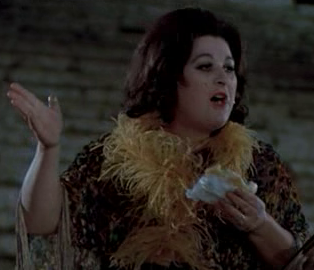
- Di Lorenzo in To Love Ophelia (1974)
- Born: 4 March 1938; Rome, Kingdom of Italy
- Died: 13 August 2022 (aged 84); Rome, Italy
- Occupation: Actress
- Relatives: Maurizio Arena (brother); Pino Insegno (nephew)

Rossana Di Lorenzo (4 March 1938 – 13 August 2022) was an Italian film actress.

== Life and career ==
Born in Rome, the sister of actor Maurizio Arena, she debuted in a main role in 1970, playing Alberto Sordi's wife in a segment of the anthology film Man and Wife.

In 1976, she reprised the role in a segment of the Sordi's comedy film A Common Sense of Modesty. Active for about twenty-five years, her works include films by Ettore Scola, Vittorio Gassman, Mauro Bolognini, Luigi Zampa and Carlo Vanzina.

In 1983, she was nominated for the David di Donatello for Best Supporting Actress for her performance in Scola's Le Bal.

== Selected filmography ==
- Man and Wife (1970)
- Without Family (1972)
- To Love Ophelia (1974)
- Claretta and Ben (1974)
- Africa Express (1976)
- A Common Sense of Modesty (1976)
- The Inheritance (1976)
- Taxi Girl (1977)
- Le Bal (1983)
- Vacanze di Natale (1983)
- Amarsi un po' (1984)
- Cuori nella tormenta (1984)
- S.P.Q.R.: 2,000 and a Half Years Ago (1994)
