= Daniele Vargas =

Italian actor

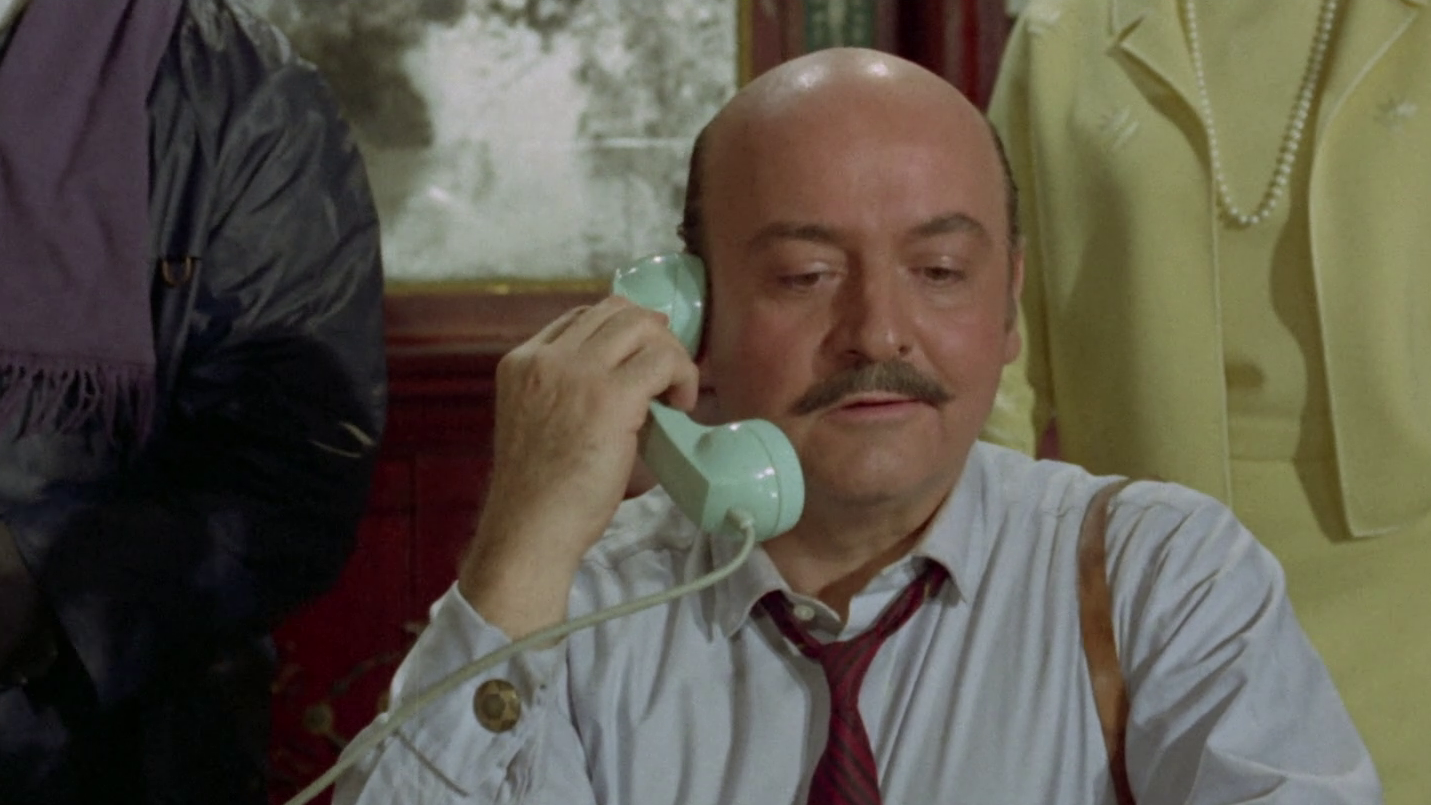
- Vargas in Il lungo, il corto, il gatto (1967)
- Born: 20 April 1922; Bologna, Italy
- Died: 26 April 1981 (aged 59); Rome, Italy
- Occupation: Film actor

Daniele Vargas, stage name of Daniele Pitani (20 April 1922 – 26 April 1981) was an Italian film actor.

== Life and career ==
Born in Imola, a small town in the district of Bologna, after attending high school with Pier Paolo Pasolini, Daniele Vargas enrolled in the Faculty of Medicine of Bologna University. After graduation in 1957 he moved to Rome to follow his passion for cinema.

He began to appear in small roles in costume films and sword-and-sandals at the end of the 1950s and rapidly became one of the most active character actors, specializing in villain roles and sometime in characters of Spanish language.

== Selected filmography ==
- Hercules Unchained (1959) - Amphiaraus
- Non perdiamo la testa (1959) - The Butler
- Le cameriere (1959) - Il baritono Marini
- Caltiki – The Immortal Monster (1959) - Bob
- The Pirate and the Slave Girl (1959) - Gamal
- The Giant of Marathon (1959) - Darius I, King of Persia
- La strada dei giganti (1960)
- Fury of the Pagans (1960) - Napur
- The Thief of Bagdad (1961) - Gamal
- Totò, Peppino e... la dolce vita (1961) - Marchese Daniele
- A Difficult Life (1961) - Marquis Capperoni
- Sodom and Gomorrah (1962) - Segur
- March on Rome (1962) - "Sua Excelencia"
- The Invincible Masked Rider (1963) - Don Luis
- Torpedo Bay (1963) - Brauzzi
- Samson and the Sea Beast (1963) - Murad
- Il Successo (1963) - Il principale di Laura
- I mostri (1963) - Professor Pinzuto (segment "I due Orfanelli")
- Terror of the Steppes (1964) - Altan Khan
- La calda vita (1964)
- Panic Button (1964)
- Hercules Against Rome (1964) - Filippo Afro
- La vendetta di Spartacus (1964) - Lucius Transone
- Hercules and the Tyrants of Babylon (1964)
- Ces dames s'en mêlent (1965) - Zacharoff
- Jungle Adventurer (1965) - Rajah Sindar
- Goliath at the Conquest of Damascus (1965) - Saud
- Up and Down (1965) - Il professor Maestrelli (segment "Questione di Principo")
- La Dama de Beirut (1965)
- Se non avessi più te (1965) - Hotel Manager in Barcelona
- Degueyo (1966) - Frank
- Seasons of Our Love (1966) - Count Della Pica
- A Man Could Get Killed (1966) - Osman
- Kiss Kiss...Bang Bang (1966) - Tol Lim
- The Spy Who Loved Flowers (1966) - Stan Harriman
- Web of Violence (1966) - Lo Vecchio
- After the Fox (1966) - Prosecuting Counsel
- Pleasant Nights (1966) - Fortebraccio da Montone
- Wanted (1967) - Gold - Mayor
- Per amore... per magia... (1967)
- Il lungo, il corto, il gatto (1967) - Ispettore americano
- Return of Django (1967) - Clay Ferguson
- Come rubare un quintale di diamanti in Russia (1967) - Zak
- Electra One (1967) - Electra 1
- Golden Chameleon (1967)
- Assault on the State Treasure (1967) - Kaufman
- The Last Killer (1967) - John Barrett
- The Stranger Returns (1967) - Good Jim
- Vengeance Is My Forgiveness (1968) - Doctor Frank Decker
- Spirits of the Dead (1968) - University professor (segment "William Wilson")
- Madigan's Millions (1968) - Giovanni Casetti (italian version)
- Cemetery Without Crosses (1969) - Will Rogers
- Zorro in the Court of England (1970) - Sir Basil Ruthford
- Bridge Over the Elbe (1969) - Major
- Zorro, the Navarra Marquis (1969) - Col. Brizard
- Poppea's Hot Nights (1969) - Druso
- Eros e Thanatos (1969)
- The President of Borgorosso Football Club (1970) - Don Ragazzoni
- Four Gunmen of the Holy Trinity (1971) - Thompson
- Riuscirà il nostro eroe a ritrovare il più grande diamante del mondo? (1971) - Dolmann
- The Devil Has Seven Faces (1971) - James Marlowe
- Il terrore con gli occhi storti (1972) - José
- Il generale dorme in piedi (1972) - Ten. Col. Poli
- Zambo il dominatore della foresta (1972) - Perkins
- I Kiss the Hand (1973) - Don Santino Bileggi
- Those Dirty Dogs (1973) - Major, Fort Apache Commander
- The Arena (1974) - Timarchus
- Playing the Field (1974) - The President
- The Voyage (1974) - Don Liborio, Lawyer
- Silence the Witness (1974) - Il senatore Turrisi
- Ante Up (1974) - Avvocato
- La nipote (1974) - Luigi / Husband
- Eyeball (1975) - Robby Alvarado
- The Sensuous Nurse (1975) - Gustavo Scarpa
- Quella provincia maliziosa (1975)
- L'ingenua (1975) - Luigi Beton
- Oh, Serafina! (1976) - Assessore Buglio
- Sex with a Smile II (1976) - Avv. Augusto Zenaro (segment "La visita")
- Il signor Ministro li pretese tutti e subito (1977) - Luigi Romagnoli
- Three Tigers Against Three Tigers (1977) - Berchielli capo di scorza
- Being Twenty (1978) - Affatati
- Where Are You Going on Holiday? (1978) - Cavalier Ciccio Colombi (segment "Sì buana")
- ...And Give Us Our Daily Sex (1979) - Oculista (as Danielle Vargas)
- Una donna di notte (1979) - Publisher
- Saturday, Sunday and Friday (1979) - Il direttore (segment "Sabato")
- Io zombo, tu zombi, lei zomba (1979)
- Atsalut pader (1979)
- Il ladrone (1980) - Ruffo
- Il lupo e l'agnello (1980) - Colonello De Luca
- Spaghetti a mezzanotte (1981) - Ulderico
- Ski Mistress (1981) - Emir Hussein
- Prickly Pears (1981)
- Accadde a Parma (1988) - (final film role)
