= Giovanna Ralli =

Italian actress (born 1935)

Giovanna Ralli OMRI
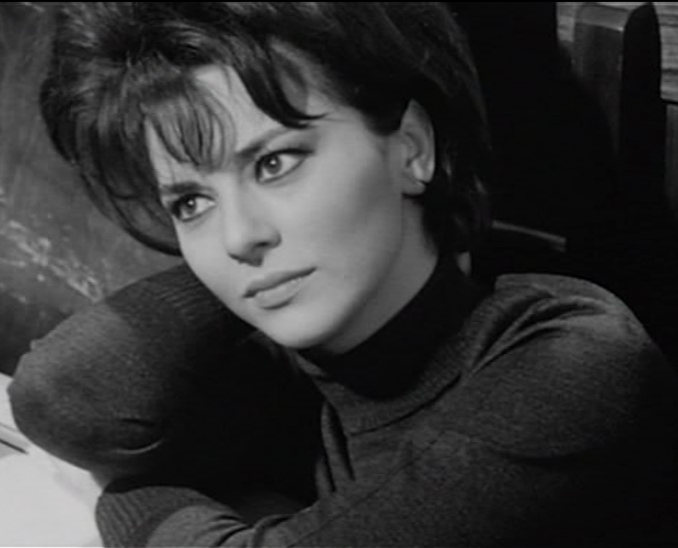
- Giovanna Ralli in La vita agra (1964)
- Born: 2 January 1935 (age 91); Rome, Italy
- Citizenship: Italian
- Occupation: Actress
- Years active: 1942–2014
- Spouse: Ettore Boschi (m. 1977; died 2013)

Giovanna Ralli (born 2 January 1935) is an Italian stage, film, and television actress.

== Life and career ==
Born in Rome, Ralli debuted as a child actress at 7; at 13, she made her theatrical debut, entering the stage company of Peppino De Filippo. After appearing in Federico Fellini and Alberto Lattuada's Variety Lights (1950), Ralli had her first film roles of weight in the mid-1950s, often in comedy films. In 1959, she had a leading role in Roberto Rossellini's General Della Rovere that won the Golden Lion at the Venice Film Festival, while in 1960 her performance in Escape by Night, also directed by Rossellini, was awarded with the Golden Gate Award for Best Actress at the San Francisco International Film Festival.

Ralli later won a Nastro d'Argento award, as best actress, for La fuga (1965). In the mid-1960s, she had a brief Hollywood career, starting from Blake Edwards' What Did You Do in the War, Daddy?. In 1974, she won her second Nastro d'Argento, as best supporting actress, for We All Loved Each Other So Much. Starting from the early 1980s, Ralli focused her activities on stage. In 1993, she received a Flaiano Prize for her career. In 2003, she was made a Grand Officer of the Italian Republic.

At the 2015 Taormina Film Fest, where she received a special award for her career, Ralli announced her retirement from acting. Jasmine Trinca eventually convinced her to make a final appearance in her 2022 directorial debut film Marcel!. The same year, Ralli was awarded a David di Donatello for her career.

== Personal life ==
Ralli considers herself Roman Catholic.

== Filmography ==
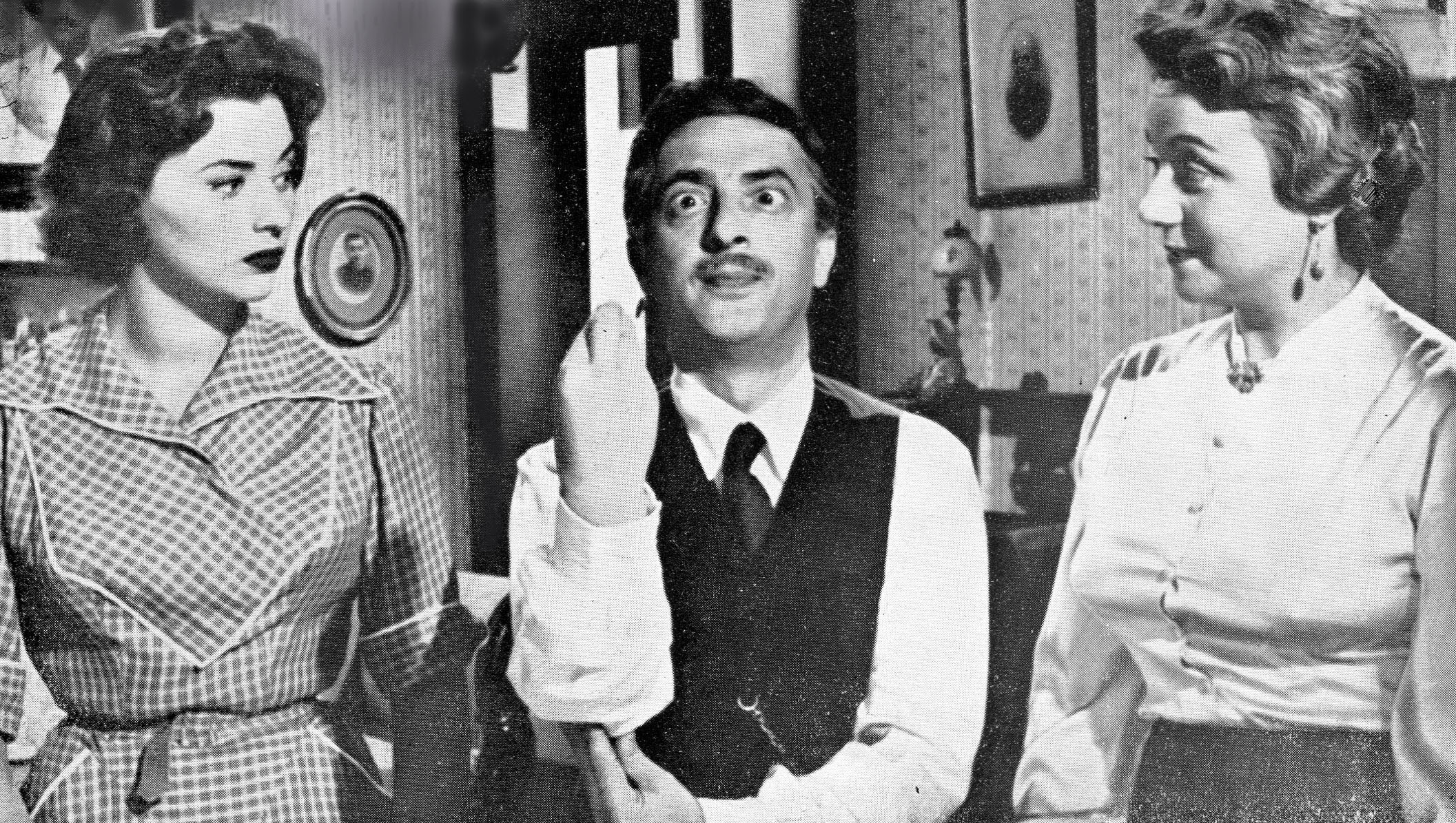
Ralli with Nino Taranto and Clelia Matania in Easy Years (1953)

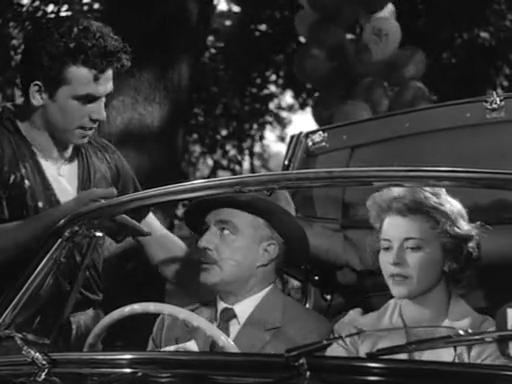
Ralli with Maurizio Arena and Vittorio De Sica in It Happened in the Park (1953)

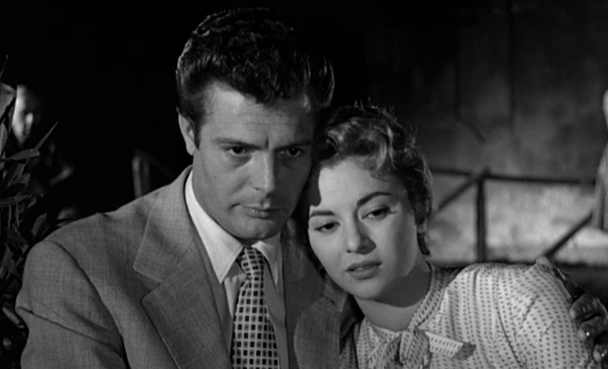
Ralli with Marcello Mastroianni in The Most Wonderful Moment (1957)

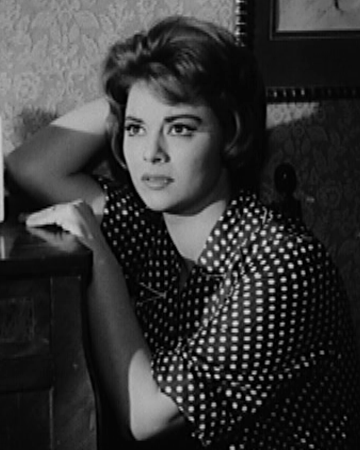
Ralli in My Wife's Enemy (1959)

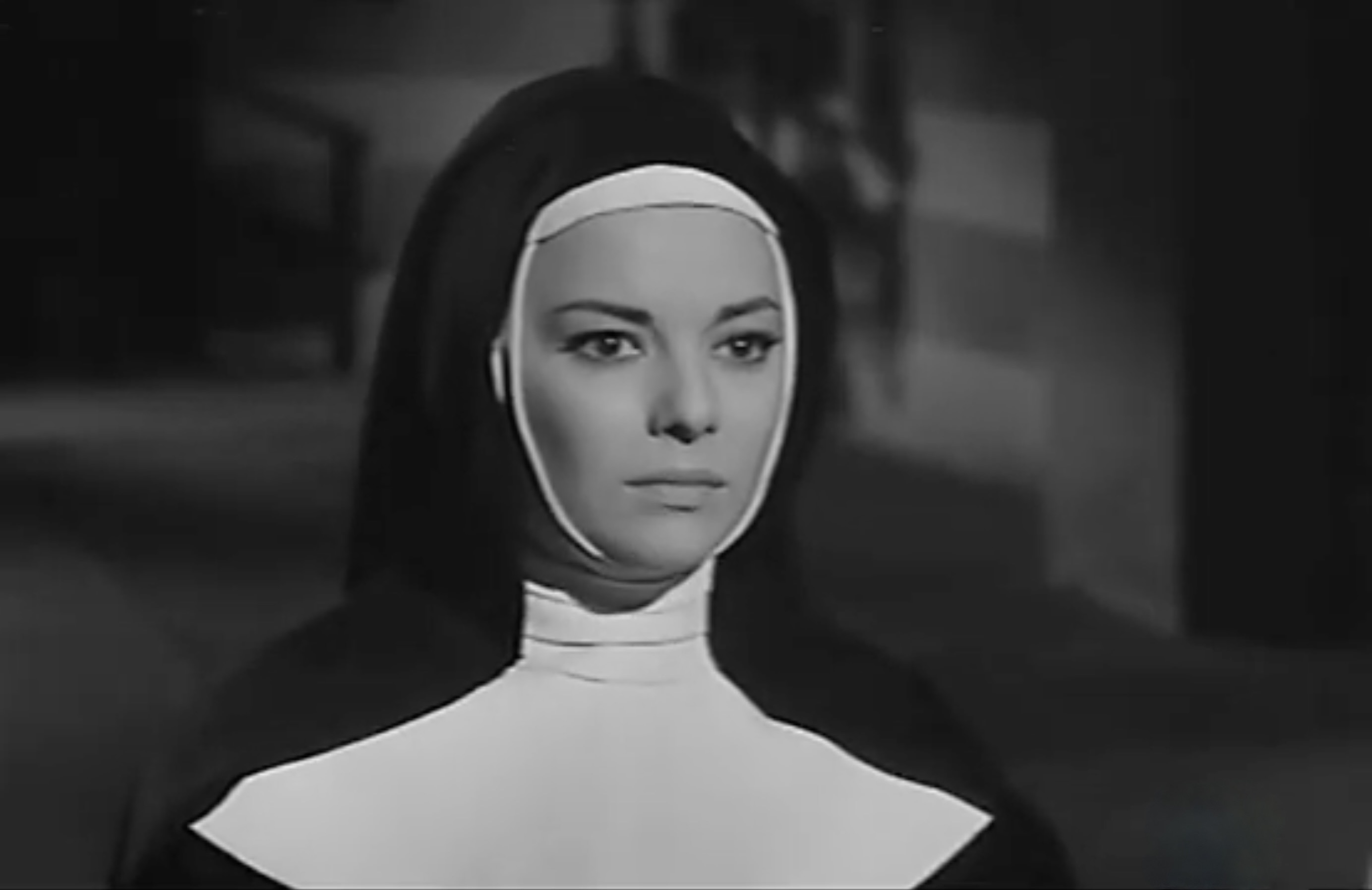
Ralli in La monaca di Monza (1962)

Ralli in The Invisible Woman (1969)

Ralli in Cold Eyes of Fear (1971)

Ralli in What's Your Sign? (1975)

=== Film ===
Year	Title	Role	Notes
1942	The Little Teacher	Little Girl	Cameo
1943	The Children Are Watching Us	Girl at Park	Uncredited
1950	Variety Lights	Young Woman	Uncredited
1951	The Passaguai Family	Marcella Passaguai	
1952	The Passaguai Family Gets Rich	Marcella Passaguai	
1953	Fermi tutti, arrivo io!	Rina	
1953	Easy Years	Teresa	
1953	La Lupa	Agnese	
1953	The Ship of Condemned Women	Deported Woman	Cameo
1953	It Happened in the Park	Virginia	
1953	Rivalry	Luisa	
1954	The Three Thieves	Marietta Rossi	
1954	Madame du Barry	Cadette	
1954	Prima di sera	Pharmacist	
1955	Le signorine dello 04	Bruna De Blasi	
1955	Le ragazze di San Frediano	Mafalda	
1955	A Hero of Our Times	Marcella	
1955	Les Hussards	Cosima	
1955	Roman Tales	Marcella	
1956	The Bigamist	Valeria Masetti	
1956	Una pelliccia di visone	Gabriella Silvestri	
1956	Time of Vacation	Lella	
1956	Peccato di castità	Valentina Colasanti	
1957	The Most Wonderful Moment	Luisa Morelli	
1957	Le belle dell'aria	Giovanna	
1958	Tuppe tuppe, Marescià!	Carmelina	
1958	Move and I'll Shoot	Giovanna	
1959	My Wife's Enemy	Luciana	
1959	Le cameriere	Virginia	
1959	I ladri	Maddalena Scognamiglio	
1959	The Defeated Victor	Lina	
1959	Wild Cats on the Beach	Giovanna	
1959	General Della Rovere	Valeria	
1959	Nel blu, dipinto di blu	Assuntina	
1960	Escape by Night	Esperia Belli	
1961	Garibaldi	Rosa	
1961	The Taste of Violence	Maria Laragana	
1961	Pastasciutta nel deserto	Angela	
1962	Horace 62	Camille Fabiani	
1962	Warriors Five	Italia	
1962	La monaca di Monza	Marianna de Leyva, the Nun of Monza	
1962	Carmen di Trastevere	Carmen	
1964	Liolà	Tuzza Azzara	
1964	Let's Talk About Women	Prostitute	Cameo
1964	La vita agra	Anna	
1965	La fuga	Piera Fabbri	
1966	What Did You Do in the War, Daddy?	Rosa Romano	
1967	The Caper of the Golden Bulls	Angela Tresler	
1968	Deadfall	Fé Moreau	
1968	The Mercenary	Columba	
1969	The Invisible Woman	Laura	
1970	Cannon for Cordoba	Leonora	
1970	Una prostituta al servizio del pubblico e in regola con le leggi dello stato	Oslavia	
1971	Cold Eyes of Fear	Anna	
1974	To Love Ophelia	Ophelia Ceceretti	
1974	What Have They Done to Your Daughters?	Deputy Prosecutor Vittoria Stori	
1974	We All Loved Each Other So Much	Elide Catenacci	
1975	What's Your Sign?	Cristina	
1975	Sex with a Smile	Esmeralda	
1976	Chi dice donna, dice donna	Miss X	
1976	Colpita da improvviso benessere	Elisabetta Mancini	Also co-writer
1976	Languid Kisses, Wet Caresses	Elena	
1980	Arrivano i bersaglieri	Nunziatina	
1981	Manolesta	Angela De Maria	
1990	Towards Evening	Pina	
1994	Once a Year, Every Year	Laura	
2003	Il pranzo della domenica	Franca Malorni	
2004	L'ultimo regalo	Mrs. Silvano	Short film
2008	Blood of the Losers	Giulia Dogliani	
2011	The Immature	Iole	
2012	The Immature: The Trip	Iole	
2014	A Golden Boy	Davide's Mother	
2022	Marcel!	The Grandmother	
2024	Titanus 1904	Herself	

=== Television ===
Year	Title	Role	Notes
1989	Poliziotti	Rosa	Television film
1995	Machinations	Marianne Stadler	Television film
1995–1997	Un prete tra noi	Elisabetta	12 episodes
2001	Angelo il custode	Elisa Anselmi	8 episodes
2003	Una famiglia per caso	Amalia	Television film
2005	I colori della vita	Dora	Television film
2008–2010	I Married a Cop	Erminia Santamaria	34 episodes
2009	Al di là del lago	Ada	Television film
2009	L'isola dei segreti – Korè	Giovanna Grimaldi	4 episodes
2011	Tutti pazzi per amore	Aunt Elvira	2 episodes
