= Erik the Conqueror =

1961 film by Mario Bava

- Italian film poster
- Directed by: Mario Bava
- Screenplay by: Oreste Biancoli; Piero Pierotti; Mario Bava
- Produced by: Ferruccio De Martino
- Starring: Cameron Mitchell; George Ardisson; Alice Kessler; Ellen Kessler; Andrea Checchi; Folco Lulli; Françoise Christophe
- Cinematography: Mario Bava; Ubaldo Terzano
- Edited by: Mario Serandrei
- Music by: Roberto Nicolosi
- Production companies: Galatea S.P.A.; Criterion Film; Societe Cinematographique Lyre
- Distributed by: Unidis (Italy)
- Release dates: December 7, 1961 (Italy); July 10, 1963 (France)
- Running time: 98 minutes
- Countries: Italy; France
- Language: Italian

Erik the Conqueror (Italian: Gli invasori, lit. 'The invaders') is a 1961 sword-and-sandal film directed and co-written by Mario Bava, and starring Cameron Mitchell, George Ardisson, and Alice & Ellen Kessler. Mitchell and Ardisson play long-lost Viking brothers in the 9th century, one of whom is raised in England, the other in Scandinavia. They finally meet after almost 20 years, as rivals on opposite sides of an English–Viking war. The films is heavily inspired by the 1958 American film The Vikings, in turn loosely based on the Old Norse saga "Tale of Ragnar's Sons".

== Plot ==
In 786 A.D., three Viking ships land in England. Harald, the only Viking chieftain interested in maintaining peace, makes a plea to King Loter. The English king sends Sir Rutford to work out a deal with the Vikings. Against the King's wishes, Rutford stages a surprise attack on the Vikings. Rutford's chief assassin kills Harald with an arrow. During the battle, Harald's two young sons, Erik and Eron, are whisked away by one of his chiefs. Eron is rescued, but Erik is left behind in the chaos.

Later, King Loter appears and threatens to strip Rutford of his title for his treachery. Rutford retaliates by having his assassin kill Loter. Loter's wife, Queen Alice, flees and, after finding Erik hiding on the beach, decides to raise him as her son.

20 years later, the Vikings once again wage war against England. The adult Eron is in love with vestal virgin Daya, the identical twin sister of the vestal Rama. They hide their love out of fear of being executed. Viking leader King Olaf makes a pact with the kingdoms of Iceland, Norway, and Sweden to invade England again. Due to his age, Olaf appoints a younger to lead the attack. Olaf chooses Eron, but Garian contests his choice, wishing to be elected leader. Olaf declares that they will have to fight to the death. Eron is victorious but refuses to kill Garian, asking him to serve as his right-hand man.

In England, the adult Erik is appointed Duke of Helford and leader of the English sea forces, replacing Sir Rutford. Rutford plants an agent on board to set fire to Erik's ship while at sea. The Viking and English fleets meet in the North Sea, and a battle begins. Vikings board Erik's flagship just as the agent sets fire to it. Erik jumps overboard and washes ashore in Viking land where the Vikings accept him as a shipwrecked fisherman.

Eron and his men arrive in England. Eron appoints Rutford as Regent and takes Queen Alice as a hostage back to Viking land. There, Rama is assigned to look after Queen Alice. Rama notices that the queen also wears a cross and mentions this to Erik. Demanding to know the prisoner's name, Erik learns that it is his 'mother'. The next day, Eron and Daya are to be married. While watching the wedding ceremony, Erik mistakenly believes that it is Rama who is being married. Enraged, Erik confronts Daya, who does not know him. Erik is then locked away by King Olaf to be executed the following morning.

Rama drugs Erik's guards, explains that the woman he saw married was her twin sister, and cuts him free. While they flee, Eron and several Vikings give pursuit. Eron nearly falls to his death, but Erik, urged by Rama, saves him. Eron continues to pursue Erik and Rama, who meet up with Queen Alice and safely sail to England.

Erik gathers a combined English-Scottish force to attack Rutford's castle but finds that Eron and the Vikings have arrived before him. Erik challenges Eron to a duel. Eron accepts, leaving Daya in Rutford's care. In the ensuing swordfight, Eron sees the tattoo on Erik's chest and recognises him as his brother. He declares a ceasefire, upsetting Rutford, who responds by having his henchman fire an arrow at Erik. Eron throws himself in the path of the arrow and is fatally wounded. The enraged Vikings attempt to storm the castle, but Rutford raises the drawbridge and threatens to kill Daya if the Vikings do not disband.

Before dying, Eron names Erik as his successor. He becomes delirious and asks to see Daya again. To accomplish this, Erik scales the castle wall. Meanwhile, Rama realizes that the dying Eron will not last much longer and poses as her sister to him. Oblivious to the deception, Eron dies upon declaring his love for her.

Erik makes his way into the castle and rescues Daya. The combined Viking, English, and Scottish armies attack the castle at dawn, scaling the walls and slaughtering the defenders. Rutford's men are killed, with Rutford himself being the last to fall when he attempts to throw a spear at the escaping Eron but is pierced with several Viking arrows.

With peace restored, Queen Alice reclaims her throne and allows Erik to leave England to claim his title as King of the Vikings. Erik returns to Viking land with Rama while Daya sails alone with the dead Eron.

== Cast ==
- Cameron Mitchell as Eron
- George Ardisson as Erik
- Alice Kessler as Rama
- Ellen Kessler as Daya
- Andrea Checchi as Sir Rutford
- Françoise Christophe as Queen Alice
- Jean-Jacques Delbo as King Olaf
- Franco Giacobini as Rustichello
- Raf Baldassarre as Black
- Enzo Doria as Bennet
- Folco Lulli as King Harald
- Franco Ressel as King Lotar
- Livia Contardi as Hadda
- Gianni Solaro as Ranco
- Joe Robinson as Garian (uncredited)

== Production ==
A co-production between Rome-based Galatea and French companies Criterion Film and Societe Cinematographique Lyre, Erik the Conqueror was shot in Rome's Titanus Studios.

== Release ==
Erik the Conqueror was released theatrically in Italy on 7 December 1961 with a 98 minute running time. It was released in the United States by American International Pictures on 12 June 1963 with an 81 minute running time, and much of Roberto Nicolosi's original score replaced with music by Les Baxter.

== Reception ==
In a contemporary review, reviewing an English-dubbed 88 minutes version, the Monthly Film Bulletin stated that the film is "enhanced by Mario Bava's luridly filtered photography and fluid camera technique, and his effortlessly eclectic direction" The review concluded that apart from the soundtrack which was described as "shattering", the technical credits were "above average, as is some of the acting", specifically pointing out Giorgio Ardisson and Andrea Checchi.

Due to the "effective" acting of Cameron Mitchell and the "full-sized Viking ships" this film has been named the best Viking picture made in Italy.
