= Agent 3S3: Massacre in the Sun =

- Directed by: Sergio Sollima
- Cinematography: Carlo Carlini
- Edited by: Bruno Mattei
- Music by: Piero Umiliani
- Release date: 1966
- Country: Italy
- Language: Italian

Agent 3S3: Massacre in the Sun (originally titled Agente 3S3, massacro al sole, also known as Agent 3S3: Hunter from the Unknown and Hunter from the Unknown) is a 1966 Italian adventure-eurospy film directed by Sergio Sollima, here credited as Simon Sterling. This is a sequel to Agent 3S3: Passport to Hell (1965) with Agent 3S3 once again played by George Ardisson. Orietta Berti, a popular Italian singer, sings in English the film's theme "Trouble galore". The two films were shot back to back.

This was filmed on locations in Berlin and Ibiza. It was coproduced by France, where it was released as Agent 3S3, massacre au soleil, and Spain, where is known as 3S3, agente especial and Agente 3S3 enviado especial.

== Cast ==
- George Ardisson as Walter Ross, Agent 3S3
- Frank Wolff as Ivan Tereczkov
- Evi Marandi as Melissa
- Michel Lemoine as Radek
- Fernando Sancho as General Siqueiros
- Luz Márquez as Miss Barrientos
- Eduardo Fajardo as Professor Karlesten
- Leontine May as Josefa
- John Karlsen as Tereczkov's Boss
- Kitty Swan as Night-club Singer (as Kersten Svanhold)
- Salvatore Borghese
- María Granada
