= A Suitcase for a Corpse =

- Directed by: Alfonso Brescia
- Written by: Antonio Fos
- Produced by: Eduardo Manzanos Brochero
- Cinematography: Emilio Foriscot
- Edited by: Antonio Gimeno; Mario Salvatore
- Music by: Carlo Savina
- Distributed by: Variety Distribution
- Release date: 1970
- Running time: 88 minutes

A Suitcase for a Corpse (Spanish: Una maleta para un cadáver) is a 1970 Italian-Spanish giallo film directed by Alfonso Brescia.

The film's Italian title, Il tuo dolce corpo da uccidere, translates as Your Sweet Body to Kill.

== Plot ==
After learning that she is cheating on him, a man who constantly fantasizes about murdering his beautiful young wife decides to do it for real. His plot involves disposing of her body in a suitcase.

== Cast ==
- George Ardisson as Clive Ardington
- Françoise Prévost as Diana Ardington
- Eduardo Fajardo as Franz Adler
- Orchidea De Santis as Elena Sanders
- Félix Dafauce
