= Gianfranco Plenizio =

Italian composer

- Born: 10 January 1941; Sedegliano, Italy
- Died: 7 February 2017 (aged 76); Rome, Italy
- Occupations: Conductor, composer, musician

Gianfranco Plenizio (10 January 1941 – 7 February 2017) was an Italian conductor, composer, pianist and essayist.

== Life and career ==
Born in Sedegliano, Plenizio studied piano with Enrico De Angelis Valentini and conduction under Franco Ferrara. After his debut as a pianist, he focused on conducting; among others, he conducted the London Symphony Orchestra, the Santa Cecilia Orchestra, the Orquesta Nacional de España, the Orchestre de chambre de Genève and the Czech Philharmonic Orchestra.

Active as a film score composer, Plenizio collaborated with notable directors such as Federico Fellini, Billy Wilder, Mario Monicelli, Pietro Germi, Ermanno Olmi. He also authored essays, mainly focusing on the history of music.

== Selected filmography ==
- Garter Colt (1968)
- La gatta in calore (1972)
- The Sensuous Nurse (1975)
- Mark of Zorro (1975)
- Young, Violent, Dangerous (1976)
- Una bella governante di colore (1976)
- Hurricane Rosy (1979)
- Masoch (1980)
- Spaghetti House (1982)
- And the Ship Sails On (1983)
- La Storia (1986)
- Django 2 (1987)
- Treasure Island in Outer Space (1987)
