= Lovebird (disambiguation) =

A lovebird is a parrot native to Africa.

Lovebird or Love Bird, or Lovebirds or Love Birds may also refer to:

== People ==
- William F. Allen (Delaware politician), American businessman and politician nicknamed "Lovebird"

== Films ==
- Love Birds (1934 film), an American film
- Love Birds (1969 film), an Italian-West German drama film
- Love Birds (1996 film), a Tamil musical-comedy film
- Love Birds (2011 film), a New Zealand romantic comedy film
- Love Birds (2023 film), an Indian film
- The Lovebirds (2007 film), a Portuguese drama film
- The Lovebirds (2020 film), an American comedy film

== Stage ==
- Love Birds (Romberg and MacDonald), 1921 Broadway musical by Sigmund Romberg, Ballard MacDonald, and Edgar Allan Woolf.
- Love Birds (Sherman), a 2015 stage musical written by Robert J. Sherman, or its title song

== Music ==
=== Albums ===
- Lovebird, by Kohmi Hirose

=== Songs ===
- "Lovebird" (song), by Leona Lewis
- "Lovebird", song by Manfred Mann from Up the Junction (1968)
- "Lovebird", song by John Entwistle from Too Late the Hero (1981)
- "Lovebird", song by Jann Browne from Tell Me Why (1990)
- "Lovebird", a song from the musical Steel Pier
- "Lovebirds", song by the British indie group Dodgy from The Dodgy Album (1993)
- "Lovebirds", song by Hot Snakes from Audit in Progress (2004)
- "Lovebirds", song by Game from Purp & Patron (2011)
- "Lovebirds", song by Ronald & Ruby
