= La nipote =

1974 film by Nello Rossati

- Directed by: Nello Rossati
- Written by: Giacomo Gramegna
- Produced by: Armando Bertuccioli
- Starring: Daniele Vargas; Francesca Muzio
- Cinematography: Vittorio Bernini; Romano Scavolini
- Music by: Carlo Savina
- Distributed by: Variety Distribution
- Release date: 1974
- Country: Italy
- Language: Italian

La nipote is a 1974 Italian commedia sexy all'italiana-erotic drama film directed by Nello Rossati and starring Daniele Vargas with Francesca Muzio.

In France, the film was released in an adult version with addition of Italian-produced hardcore sequences and under the title Une Nièce malicieuse in 1980.

== Plot ==
Veneto in the year 1958. Wealthy engineer Luigi Favaretto arrives at his summer retreat to spend a quiet holiday with his dimwitted son Antonio, second wife and former stripper Zoraide, voluptuous housemaid Doris, and Piero, his friend but also Zoraide's secret lover. However, everything changes when Adele, Zoraide's niece, comes to stay with them following her mother's demise.

== Cast ==
- Daniele Vargas: Luigi Favaretto
- Francesca Muzio: Adele
- Annie Carol Edel: Zoraide 'Kiki' Favaretto
- George Ardisson: Piero
- Orchidea De Santis: Doris
- Roberto Proietti: Antonio Favaretto
- Otello Cazzola: the priest
- Ezio Marano: Romeo, the doctor
