= Paolo Spinola (director) =

Italian film director and screenwriter

- Born: 27 July 1929; Genoa, Italy
- Died: 11 March 2005 (aged 75); Rome, Italy
- Occupations: Screenwriter, director

Paolo Spinola (27 July 1929 – 11 March 2005) was an Italian film director and screenwriter.

== Life and career ==
Born in Genoa into a wealthy family, while still a teenager Spinola became friends with future film producer Tonino Cervi, who later convinced him to move in Rome to pursue a career in films. In the early 1950s, he started working as a scriptwriter and an assistant director, collaborating with Riccardo Freda, Luigi Comencini, Gianni Franciolini and Giorgio Capitani.

Spinola made his directorial debut with La fuga. His work largely consisted of female character portraits. He retired in the second half of the 1970s, following the critical and commercial failure of his last film Un giorno alla fine di ottobre and due to increasing difficulties in getting his works produced. Following his retirement, he turned to viticulture, managing a family estate near Tassarolo Castle.

== Filmography ==
- La fuga (1965)
- L'estate (1966)
- The Invisible Woman (1969)
- Un giorno alla fine di ottobre (1977)
