= The Invisible Woman (1969 film) =

- Directed by: Paolo Spinola
- Written by: Paolo Spinola; Dacia Maraini; Ottavio Jemma
- Produced by: Silvio Clementelli
- Starring: Giovanna Ralli; Carla Gravina
- Cinematography: Silvano Ippoliti
- Edited by: Sergio Montanari
- Music by: Ennio Morricone
- Release date: September 4, 1969
- Language: Italian

The Invisible Woman (Italian: La donna invisibile) is a 1969 Italian drama film written and directed by Paolo Spinola and starring Giovanna Ralli and Carla Gravina.

== Plot ==
Laura comes to the painful realization that her husband, Andrea, no longer harbors any affection for her. She feels as though she is fading away, barely existing in his eyes. Despite her deep love for him, Andrea's attention seems solely focused on Delfina, another woman residing in their home. Laura's attempts to revive their relationship prove futile, even after confessing to occasional infidelities.

During a hunting expedition, Andrea accidentally shoots and kills Laura while aiming at a pheasant. However, he fails to notice her lifeless body lying beside the prey and instead moves closer to Delfina. In a haunting moment, Andrea addresses Laura by her name, unaware of the tragedy he has caused.

== Cast ==
- Giovanna Ralli as Laura
- Carla Gravina as Delfina
- Anita Sanders as Anita
- Silvano Tranquilli as Andrea
- Gigi Rizzi as Carlo
- Elena Persiani as Tania
- Gino Cassani as Tania's Husband
- Franca Sciutto as Crocetta
- Raúl Ramírez as Osvaldo

== Production ==
The film is based on a short story by Alberto Moravia. It was produced by Clesi Cinematografica.

== Release ==
The film received a domestic theatrical release in the summer of 1969. Seized for obscenity, with magistrates requiring about 20 minutes of cuts, it was eventually re-released two months later.

== Reception ==
The film grossed about 280 millions lire at the domestic box office. Italian film critic Paolo Mereghetti described it as "convoluted" and "outdated in its psychological notations". Film historian Roberto Curti similarly noted it "remains a work of its time, with didactic excesses and some awkward passages".

== See also ==
- List of Italian films of 1969
