= It Happened in the Park =

1953 film

- Directed by: Gianni Franciolini
- Written by: Sergio Amidei; Giorgio Bassani
- Produced by: Giorgio Agliani
- Cinematography: Mario Bava
- Music by: Mario Nascimbene
- Release date: 18 December 1953
- Running time: 98 minutes
- Country: Italy
- Language: Italian
- Box office: 675,488 admissions (France)

It Happened in the Park (Italian: Villa Borghese) is a 1953 film directed by Gianni Franciolini. The film consists of six vignettes set in the Villa Borghese gardens in Rome.

== Plot ==
The story shows the lives of various people from different parts of society who, on one particular day, stroll through the park.

=== Servants and soldiers ===
First morning. A group of Venetian waitresses meets in Piazza di Siena, where they take the children of the families they work for to play. One of them, Lidia, reunites with the group after a while, and she explains that she attempted suicide due to a love disappointment suffered by a soldier; another, Marietta, claims that she would be very ready to kill herself if a man made fun of her. She too is dating a Neapolitan soldier, who takes her aside and invites her to a night meeting in the park. After disdainfully refusing, and seeing the soldier engaged in courting a Swedish nanny, the girl disappears. Her friends look for her frantically, thinking that she may have thrown herself off the cliff of the Muro Torto; her fears vanish when she finds her again as she quietly watches a puppet show.

=== Greek ===
Late morning. Some classical high school students have come up with a trick to avoid an almost certain failure. One of them, Anna Maria, made an appointment with the Greek teacher at the Sea Horse Fountain; the girl has to pretend that she is in love with him and kiss him suddenly, so that the other classmates can secretly photograph the kiss and then use the photo to blackmail the teacher and get the promotion. The teacher introduces himself, and tells Anna Maria his sad story: after the end of the school year he will have to leave teaching because he is losing his sight. The student, moved, hugs him, but at the same time tries to cover his face so that the blackmail photo fails.

== Cast ==
- Maurizio Arena - Virginia's boyfriend
- Margherita Autuori - Fanny
- Eloisa Cianni - Antonietta
- Eduardo De Filippo - Fanny's father
- Vittorio De Sica - Lawyer Cavazzuti
- Anna Maria Ferrero - Anna Maria, the student
- Aldo Giuffrè - Attilio Scandacci
- Leda Gloria - Fanny's mother
- Germana Paolieri - The traffic policewoman
- François Périer - The professor
- Gérard Philipe - Carlo, Valeria's lover
- Micheline Presle - Valeria
- Giovanna Ralli - Virginia
- Franca Valeri - Elvira
