= Nello Rossati =

Italian director and screenwriter

- Born: 15 June 1942; Adria, Italy
- Died: 16 October 2009 (aged 67); Rome, Italy
- Occupation(s): Director, screenwriter

Nello Rossati (15 June 1942 – 16 October 2009) was an Italian director and screenwriter.

== Life and career ==
Born in Adria, Rossati studied at the Accademia d'Arte Drammatica in Rome, and started his career on stage, as assistant director and occasional actor for notable directors such as Franco Zeffirelli, Giorgio Albertazzi, Giuseppe Patroni Griffi and Luigi Squarzina.

Rossati made his film directing and writing debut in 1971, with Bella di giorno, moglie di notte, a low-budget erotic comedy starring Eva Czemerys, which enjoyed a moderate success. In the 1980s he adopted the stage name Ted Archer for a number of films, including Django Strikes Again, an attempt of relaunching the Spaghetti Western genre which resulted in both a critical and commercial disappointment. He retired in the mid-1990s.

== Filmography ==
- Bella di giorno moglie di notte (1971)
- The Cat in Heat (1972)
- Buona parte di Paolina (1973)
- La nipote (1974)
- The Sensuous Nurse (1975)
- I figli non si toccano! (1978)
- Io zombo, tu zombi, lei zomba (1979)
- Le mani di una donna sola (1979)
- A Woman in the Night (1979)
- Fuga scabrosamente pericolosa (1985)
- Django Strikes Again (1987)
- Alien Terminator (1988)
- Tides of War (1990)
- La carne e il diavolo (1992) (TV)
- Il giorno del giudizio (1993)
