= Ebertfest =

American film festival (1999–2026)

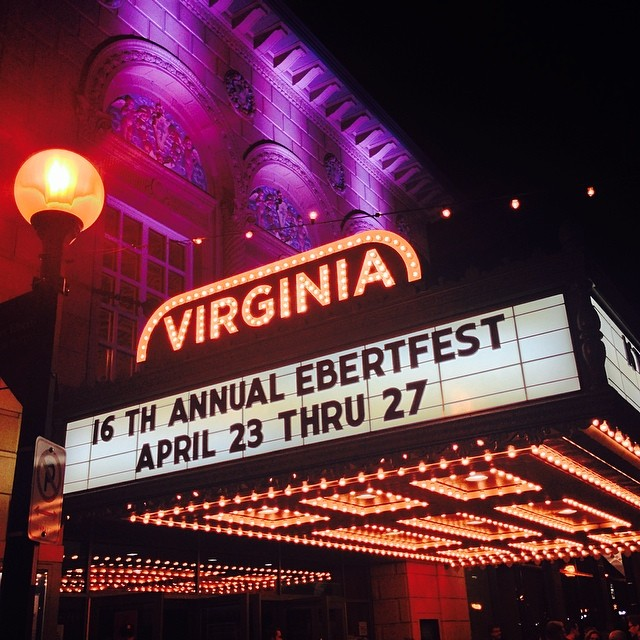
- A view of the Virginia Theatre's marquee in 2014 for Ebertfest
- Status: Defunct
- Genre: Film festival
- Frequency: Annually
- Location: Champaign, Illinois
- Country: United States
- Years active: 1999–2026
- Founder: Roger Ebert
- Most recent: April 18, 2026
- Capacity: 1,463 (Virginia Theatre)
- People: Roger Ebert; Chaz Ebert
- Website: ebertfest.com

Ebertfest was an annual film festival held every April in Champaign, Illinois, United States, organized by the College of Media at the University of Illinois. Roger Ebert, the TV and Chicago Sun-Times film critic, was a native of the adjoining town of Urbana, Illinois, and was an alumnus of the University. Founded in 1999 as Roger Ebert's Overlooked Film Festival, this event was the only long-running film festival created by a critic. Despite Ebert's death in 2013, the festival continued to operate until 2026 based on Ebert's notes and vision for the kinds of films he championed.

The 2020 festival was postponed due to the coronavirus pandemic. The 22nd edition of the event was rescheduled three times, eventually opening on April 20, 2022.

In September 2025, it was announced that the 2025 event marked its final year in Champaign, citing "financial considerations". The announcement did not include specific details about the future of the festival, but said that festival founders "are actively exploring inspired ideas for reinventing Ebertfest". In December 2025, after requests from fans, it was announced that Ebertfest would return on April 17–19, 2026, for its 27th and final edition entitled "One Last Dance". Later, the festival dates were changed to April 17–18, 2026, and the branding was updated to "Ebertfest: The Last Dance".

== Origins ==
The festival is a direct descendant of a program put on at the University of Illinois at Urbana–Champaign in 1997 called Cyberfest which used the supposed birthday of HAL (the computer in the film 2001: A Space Odyssey) to highlight the University's involvement in the history of computers and computing. The film was to be shown as part of Cyberfest, Roger Ebert had agreed to host and actor Gary Lockwood was a special guest.

It was suggested that the film should ideally be shown as it was originally, in 70 mm format. The original plan was to have the screening at the University's performing arts center but time constraints vs. the need to install projection equipment and elaborate six channel sound made this impossible. Someone suggested looking at the Virginia Theatre, as 70 mm films had been shown there in the past. At this point the theatre was in the hands of a local live theatre group and had not run films since sold by a theatre chain. All concerned were pleasantly surprised to learn the chain had left behind not only what is reputed to be the finest 35/70 mm projector made but also the screen and speakers. The rest of the equipment was brought in for the special showing which went perfectly.

== Venue ==
Since its inception in 1999 through the 2026 festival, Ebertfest was held at the Virginia Theatre, an old-time movie palace in Champaign built in 1921 and listed on the National Register of Historic Places. The theatre is now owned by the Champaign Park District. Ebert spoke of having attended films at the Virginia while growing up in Champaign-Urbana and attending the University. It was Ebert's intention that all festival attendees see all of the films in a single theatre in order to create a sense of community among film lovers.

In 2014, a bronze statue of Roger Ebert was unveiled outside of the Virginia Theatre as tribute to both Ebert and Ebertfest.

In September 2025, festival administrators cited "financial considerations facing both universities and film festivals" as a reason for discontinuing the festival in Champaign, as it had been for 26 years. They said there is "not a clearly sustainable path for the festival in its present form". The announcement did not include future plans for the festival, other than to say that Chaz Ebert and festival director Nate Kohn "are actively exploring inspired ideas for reinventing Ebertfest and will be sharing updates as those plans crystallize". On November 8, 2025, Ebert confirmed that a 27th final edition of the festival would be held if fans respond to a two-question survey by November 14. In December 2025, it was announced that the festival would return for a final edition entitled "One Last Dance" from April 17-19, 2026, lasting for two days and consisting of eight films. Passes for the final edition went on sale on January 30, 2026. In March 2026, it was announced that the dates for the final festival would be April 17-18.

=== Growth ===
Through donations, the Virginia has been able to fully equip its projection and sound system with a second projector, the latest in digital sound equipment and top quality lenses. The theatre's screen is 56 feet wide by 23 feet high, with a viewable image of up to 50 feet wide x 21½ feet high. The main speakers sit directly behind the screen during film presentations and are augmented by 36 surround sound speakers.

Instrumental in these upgrades has been notable Chicago-based projection expert James Bond who doubles as one of the projectionists during the festival.

=== Capacity ===
Since 2013, the Virginia Theatre has a seating capacity of 1,463. The theatre was closed from 2012 until April 2013 for renovations that included replacing all of the seats. Capacity dropped from about 1,550 to 1,463 but the new seats are more comfortable and the theatre offers wheelchair and companion access.

== Name change ==
In April 2007, it was announced that beginning in 2008 with the tenth festival "Overlooked" would be dropped from the name and subsequent events would be known as "Roger Ebert's Film Festival", but commonly referred to as simply Ebertfest. This did not necessarily indicate any change in the philosophy or theme but simply eliminated the need to explain when current or even unreleased films were included which had sometimes been the case. They had sometimes been jokingly referred to as "pre-overlooked."

== Selection criteria ==
Unlike typical film festivals, Ebertfest does not accept submissions. Roger Ebert selected films for the festival which in his opinion are excellent, but had been overlooked by the public or by film distribution companies. All films were selected from those that Ebert saw in the course of his normal reviewing work. Since Ebert's death, all films have been selected by the Festival Committee.

The original purpose of the Overlooked Film Festival, as reflected in the name, was to showcase films that had not been given enough attention by the public, film critics, or even distributors. Ebert had cheerfully admitted that he could bend the definition of "overlooked" to accommodate any film that he would like to include, since entire genres and formats can be overlooked as well as individual films. The selection philosophy continued, but with the name change there would no longer be a need to come up with a pretext for including any film.

=== 70 mm ===
For many years, the festival opened with a film in the 70 mm format. The films could be major releases, like 2001: A Space Odyssey or Patton, or less well-known, like 2005's showing of the French film Playtime. These films were all chosen primarily due to their use of the 70 mm process, which Ebert felt was overlooked.

=== Silent film ===
Each year a silent film was shown with live orchestral accompaniment. The films selected were generally well-known (for example, Nosferatu), but Ebert felt that silent films in general are overlooked by the majority of moviegoers. The festival also strived to include a musical film for the same reason. Performers providing live accompaniment have included the Champaign-Urbana Symphony Orchestra and the Alloy Orchestra.

== Festival format ==
Twelve to fourteen films were presented at each festival, opening with a single film on a Wednesday night and concluding with a single movie the following Sunday. On each day during the interim, three or four films are presented. As of 2019, the format excluded the Sunday screening.

For the first eight festivals, before each screening Roger Ebert would make a few introductory remarks. After the film was shown he would have a discussion on stage with the filmmakers or others connected with the film, sometimes hosting a brief panel discussion.

After Ebert lost his speaking voice due to cancer, starting with the ninth festival in 2007, his wife Chaz assumed many of the hosting duties. Post-show panels were led by his "Far-Flung Correspondents" or other respected film professionals, such as film historian David Bordwell and film critic Christy Lemire.

On April 4, 2013, Ebert died after a long battle with cancer. Despite his death, the film festival went along as scheduled, simultaneously acting as a tribute to Ebert's legacy. At the opening of the 15th annual Ebertfest, it was announced by Ebert's wife, Chaz, that his alma mater, the University of Illinois at Urbana–Champaign, would be establishing a new Film Studies program within the College of Media in honor of his legacy. The program was funded in part by a $1 million grant from Ebert and his wife to the University. The non-degree program is both a collection of film-related seminars and classes as well as a platform for Ebertfest to continue.

=== Festival guests ===
Since its inception, many film directors, actors, producers, cinematographers and other crew members, as well as studio executives were invited to participate in Ebertfest. Examples include Werner Herzog, Spike Lee, and Tilda Swinton.

For the tenth Ebertfest in 2010, many of the international invited guests were unable to attend due to the volcanic eruptions in Iceland that disrupted air travel in Europe.

For the 2022 festival, actor Gilbert Gottfried was scheduled to appear as a panelist to discuss the documentary film about him, Gilbert. In the aftermath of his death on April 12, 2022, Ebertfest announced it was dedicating the event to the memories of Gottfried and Sidney Poitier.

=== Awards ===
As a non-competitive film festival, Ebertfest did not have jury or audience awards. But beginning with the sixth festival in 2004, all invited guests were given an award originally referred to by Ebert as the Order of the Silver Thumb, but subsequently known as the Golden Thumb Award. The Golden Thumb trophy is a casting of Roger Ebert's thumb in the up position, made by the R.S. Owens & Company, which is the same business that makes the Oscar statuette.

The first Roger Ebert Humanitarian Award was presented in 2016 to co-directors Andrew Young and Stephen Apkon for their documentary film Disturbing the Peace. The film focuses on the work of Combatants for Peace, a group of former Israeli soldiers and Palestinian fighters who put down their weapons and began working together for peace in the region.

In 2017, the second Ebert Humanitarian Award was presented to Norman Lear for "a lifetime of empathy". Lear was the first person to receive the award, because the 2016 award was given to the film Disturbing the Peace. Lear was a special guest at the 2017 festival, to screen the documentary about his life.

In 2019, the third Ebert Humanitarian Award was presented to Morgan Neville for his film Won't You Be My Neighbor?. That same year, Chaz Ebert presented the first-ever Ebertfest Icon Award to Rita Coburn Whack for the documentary film she co-directed about poet and civil rights activist Maya Angelou, titled Maya Angelou: And Still I Rise.

=== Academic panel discussions ===
Co-sponsored by the University of Illinois College of Media, every Ebertfest since its inception included panel discussions with invited festival guests and scholars from academia, covering a variety of film-related topics. These discussions were free and open to the public, and were held in the mornings during the festival. From 1999 to 2016, the panels were held on the University of Illinois campus. Beginning in 2017, the panel discussions are held in a hotel close to the Virginia Theatre.

=== Live streaming ===
Beginning in 2010, the panel discussions, film introductions, and post-film discussions with festival guests were streamed live, and then archived on Ebertfest's YouTube channel.

=== Admission ===
Festival goers could purchase tickets to individual shows or full-festival passes. The number of passes sold was limited to 1,000 with the remainder of seats allotted for individual tickets or sponsors. As passholders do not necessarily attend every show, it was often possible to obtain tickets at the last minute after empty seats are counted. At every festival since 2002, all patrons waiting in line for sold-out films were able to gain entry to the theatre.

Passes for the first Ebertfest in 1999 cost $30, and individual film tickets were $5. In 2016, passes cost $150, and individual film tickets were $15. In 2023, passes cost $200 and individual film tickets were $20. For the final, two-day edition of the festival in 2026, passes cost $150 and individual film tickets were $20.

The first sell-out of passes was in 2004.

== Festival administration ==
Festival founder, programmer and host, 1999–2012: Roger Ebert

Festival producer, 1999–2006: Nancy Casey

Festival producer and host, 2007–2026: Chaz Ebert

Festival director, 1999–2026: Nate Kohn

== Films ==
The following is a complete list of films presented at Ebertfest.

=== 2026 ===
Festival schedule

Title	Director	Year	Starring	Notes
Charliebird	Libby Ewing	2025	Samantha Smart, Gabe Fazio	Post-film Q&A included Smart
Nuremberg	James Vanderbilt	2025	Russell Crowe, Rami Malek	Post-film Q&A included Vanderbilt
The Last Movie Critic	Luke Boyce, Michael Moreci	2026	Roger Ebert	Post-film Q&A included Boyce and Moreci
Bob Trevino Likes It	Tracie Laymon	2024	Barbie Ferreira, John Leguizamo, French Stewart	Post-film Q&A included Laymon and Stewart
Get Out	Jordan Peele	2017	Daniel Kaluuya, Allison Williams, Lil Rel Howery	Post-film Q&A included Betty Gabriel
The General	Buster Keaton	1926	Buster Keaton, Marion Mack	Anvil Orchestra played live accompaniment. Post-film Q&A participants included film critics Nell Minow and Michael Phillips
Mi Familia	Gregory Nava	1995	Jimmy Smits, Edward James Olmos, Esai Morales	Post-film Q&A included Nava
Chili Finger	Edd Benda, Stephen Helstad	2026	Judy Greer, Sean Astin, Bryan Cranston, John Goodman	Post-film Q&A included Greer, Goodman, Benda and Helstad
The American President	Rob Reiner	1995	Michael Douglas, Annette Bening	Post-film Q&A included Chaz Ebert, Nate Kohn and Matt Fagerholm

=== 2025 ===
Festival schedule

Title	Director	Year	Starring	Notes
The Searchers	John Ford	1956	John Wayne, Jeffrey Hunter, Vera Miles, Ward Bond, Natalie Wood	Post-film Q&A included Eric Pierson, film scholar
Megalopolis	Francis Ford Coppola	2024	Adam Driver, Giancarlo Esposito	Post-film Q&A included Coppola live on a video call and Michael Barker
Desperately Seeking Susan	Susan Seidelman	1984	Rosanna Arquette, Aidan Quinn, Madonna	Post-film Q&A included Seidelman and Arquette
Harlan County, USA (documentary)	Barbara Kopple	1976	various Kentucky mine workers	Post-film Q&A included Kopple
His Three Daughters	Azazel Jacobs	2023	Carrie Coon, Natasha Lyonne, Elizabeth Olsen	Post-film Q&A included Jacobs
A Little Prayer	Angus MacLachlan	2023	David Strathairn, Jane Levy, Celia Weston	Post-film Q&A included MacLachlan
I'm Still Here	Walter Salles	2024	Fernanda Torres, Selton Mello, Fernanda Montenegro	Post-film Q&A included a panel of film critics
Rumours	Guy Maddin, Evan Johnson, Galen Johnson	2024	Cate Blanchette, Roy Dupuis, Denis Ménochet, Nikki Amuka-Bird, Rolando Ravello, Takehiro Hira, Zlatko Burić, Alicia Vikander	Post-film Q&A included Maddin live on a video call
The Adventures of Prince Achmed	Lotte Reiniger	1926	silent silhouette animated feature film	The Anvil Orchestra provided musical accompaniment
Color Book	David Fortune	2024	William Catlett, Jeremiah Daniels	Post-film Q&A included Fortune, Kiah Clingman (producer), Catlett, Daniels and Daniels's parents
Touch	Baltasar Kormákur	2024	Egill Ólafsson, Palmi Kormákur, Yoko Narahashi	post-film Q&A guests TBA
The Hangover	Todd Phillips	2009	Bradley Cooper, Ed Helms, Zach Galifianakis	Post-film Q&A included Scott Budnick, executive producer

=== 2024 ===
Festival schedule

Title	Director	Year	Starring	Notes
Star 80	Bob Fosse	1983	Mariel Hemingway, Eric Roberts, Cliff Robertson, Carroll Baker, Roger Rees, David Clennon	Post-film Q&A included Roberts; Hemingway was scheduled to appear but was unable to attend
The Light of Truth: Richard Hunt's Monument to Ida B. Wells (documentary)	Rana Segal	2024	Richard Hunt	Post-film Q&A included Segal
Conducting Life (short documentary)	Diane Moore	2022	Roderick Cox	Post-film Q&A included Moore and film subject Cox
Stony Island	Andrew Davis	1978	Richard Davis	Post-film Q&A included Andrew and Richard Davis, followed by a performance by Richard Davis' band
The Teacher's Lounge	İlker Çatak	2013	Leonie Benesch, Leonard Stettnisch, Eva Löbau	Post-film Q&A included Michael Barker, co-president of Sony Pictures Classics
Cookie's Fortune	Robert Altman	1999	Glenn Close, Julianne Moore, Liv Tyler, Chris O'Donnell, Charles S. Dutton, Patricia Neal	Post-film Q&A included a panel of film critics and scholars
Eternal Sunshine of the Spotless Mind	Michel Gondry	2004	Jim Carrey, Kate Winslet, Kirsten Dunst, Mark Ruffalo, Elijah Wood, Tom Wilkinson	Post-film Q&A included a panel of film critics and scholars
Little Richard: I Am Everything	Lisa Cortés	2023	Little Richard	Post-film Q&A included director and producer Cortés
The Best Man	Malcolm D. Lee	1999	Taye Diggs, Nia Long	Post-film Q&A included director and writer Lee
Blackmail (silent version)	Alfred Hitchcock	1929	Anny Ondra, John Longden, Cyril Ritchard	The Anvil Orchestra provided musical accompaniment; post-film Q&A included Orchestra musician Terry Donahue
Omoiyari: A Song Film by Kishi Bashi	Kishi Bashi, Justin Taylor Smith	2022	Kishi Bashi	Post-film Q&A included co-director and subject Bashi
Albany Road	Christine Swanson	2024	Renée Elise Goldsberry, Lynn Whitfield	World premiere; post-film Q&A included director and writer Swanson, producer Michael Swanson and actors Goldsberry and Whitfield
Man on the Moon	Miloš Forman	1999	Jim Carrey, Danny DeVito, Courtney Love, Paul Giamatti	Post-film Q&A included writers Scott Alexander and Larry Karaszewski

=== 2023 ===
Festival schedule

Title	Director	Year	Starring	Notes
Nine Days	Edson Oda	2020	Winston Duke, Benedict Wong, Zazie Beetz, Tony Hale and Bill Skarsgård	Post-film Q&A included Oda and Jason Michael Berman, producer
Tokyo Story	Yasujirō Ozu	1953	Chishū Ryū, Chieko Higashiyama, Setsuko Hara and Haruko Sugimura	Post-film Q&A included film critic Michael Phillips
The Cabinet of Dr. Caligari	Robert Wiene	1920	Werner Krauss, Conrad Veidt	The Anvil Orchestra provided musical accompaniment; post-film Q&A included film critic Michael Phillips and professor Todd Rendleman
My Name is Sara	Steven Oritt	2019	Zuzanna Surowy, Eryk Lubos and Michalina Olszańska	Post-film Q&A included Oritt, executive producer Mickey Shapiro (son of the film's title character), and Holocaust survivor William Gingold
American Folk	David Heinz	2017	Joe Purdy, Amber Rubarth	Post-film Q&A included Heinz and Rubarth
To Leslie	Michael Morris	2022	Andrea Riseborough	Post-film Q&A included Morris
Marian Anderson: The Whole World in Her Hands	Rita Coburn	2022	Marian Anderson	Post-film Q&A included Coburn and producer Brenda Robinson; musical performance by student Viveca Richards
In & Of Itself	Frank Oz	2020	Derek DelGaudio	Theatrical premiere. Pre-taped introduction by executive producer Stephen Colbert; post-film Q&A included Oz, DelGaudio, and producers Jake Friedman and Vanessa Lauren
Team Dream (short documentary)	Luchina Fisher	2022	Madeline Murphy Rabb, Ann E. Smith	Post-film Q&A included Fisher, Rabb, Smith and coach Derrick Q. Milligan
Club Alli (short)	Justen Turner and Julien Turner	2020		Post-film Q&A included the Turner Brothers and Max Libman, director of the CU International Film Festival
Fresh	Boaz Yakin	1994	Sean Nelson, Giancarlo Esposito, Samuel L. Jackson and N'Bushe Wright	Post-film Q&A included producer Lawrence Bender
Wings of Desire	Wim Wenders	1987	Bruno Ganz, Solveig Dommartin	Post-film Q&A included Michael Barker, and Wenders via video call
Forrest Gump	Robert Zemeckis	1994	Tom Hanks, Robin Wright, Gary Sinise, Mykelti Williamson and Sally Field	Post-film Q&A included Williamson

=== 2022 ===
Festival schedule

Title	Director	Year	Starring	Notes
Summer of Soul	Ahmir "Questlove" Thompson	2021	various artists	Pre-film musical performance by Eef Barzelay performing his song "Roger Ebert"; post-film musical performance included Tammy McCann and local bands Aplustrodamus and Ther'Up.Y
The Phantom of the Open	Craig Roberts	2021	Mark Rylance, Sally Hawkins	Post-film Q&A included film executive Michael Barker and Champaign film critics Chuck Koplinski and Pam Powell
The 39 Steps	Alfred Hitchcock	1935	Robert Donat, Madeleine Carroll	Post-film Q&A included Michael Barker, film critic Michael Phillips and Ramin Bahrani
Gilbert	Neil Berkeley	2017	Gilbert Gottfried	Post-film Q&A was scheduled to include Gottfried and Berkeley; as a result of Gottfried's death nine days prior, the post-film discussion included Berkeley, Terry Zwigoff, executive producer Chris Kelly, and Gottfried's wife Dara via video call
French Exit	Azazel Jacobs	2020	Michelle Pfeiffer, Lucas Hedges	Post-film Q&A included Jacobs and Michael Barker
Lifeline (short)	Jason Delane Lee and Yvonne Huff Lee			
Passing	Rebecca Hall	2021	Tessa Thompson, Ruth Negga	Post-film Q&A included Chaz Ebert, executive producer Brenda Robinson, and Yvonne Huff Lee
Golden Arm	Maureen Bharoocha	2020	Mary Holland, Betsy Sodaro, Dot-Marie Jones	Post-film Q&A included screenwriters Anne Marie Allison and Jenna Milly
The White Tiger	Ramin Bahrani	2021	Adarsh Gourav, Priyanka Chopra-Jonas, Rajkummar Rao	Post-film Q&A included Bahrani and film critics Brian Tallerico and Nick Allen
Ghost World	Terry Zwigoff	2001	Thora Birch, Scarlett Johansson	Post-film Q&A included Zwigoff and Birch
Siren of the Tropics	Mario Nalpas, Henri Étiévant	1927	Josephine Baker	Renee Baker and 10 members of the Chicago Modern Orchestra played live accompaniment; post-film Q&A included scholar Douglas A. Williams, Baker, Michael Phillips and Chaz Ebert
Krisha	Trey Edward Shults	2015	Krisha Fairchild, Robyn Fairchild, Bill Wise	Post-film Q&A included Fairchild, film critic Nell Minow, Joseph Omo-Osagie and Eric Pierson
Soy Cubana	Jeremy Ungar, Ivaylo Getov	2021	Vocal Vidas	Post-film Q&A included Ungar and producer Robin Ungar; post-film performance by Tito Carillo and the University of Illinois Latin Jazz Ensemble
Nightmare Alley	Guillermo del Toro	2021	Bradley Cooper, Cate Blanchett, Toni Collette, Willem Dafoe	Post-film Q&A was scheduled to include del Toro but he was unable to attend in person; a pre-taped introduction and post-film Q&A with del Toro and co-writer Kim Morgan with Chaz Ebert and Nate Kohn followed

=== 2019 ===
Festival schedule

Title	Director	Year	Starring	Notes
Amazing Grace	Sydney Pollack; Alan Elliott (realizer and producer)	2018	Aretha Franklin	Post-film Q&A included Elliott, Tirrell D. Whittley (producer), and a performance by The Martin Luther King Jr. Community Choir of Champaign-Urbana
Cœur fidèle	Jean Epstein	1923	Gina Manès, Léon Mathot, Edmond Van Daële	Alloy Orchestra played live accompaniment. Post-film Q&A included two members of the Alloy Orchestra, and Michael Phillips (film critic)
Rachel Getting Married	Jonathan Demme	2008	Anne Hathaway, Rosemarie DeWitt, Bill Irwin, Debra Winger	Post-film Q&A included Michael Barker, Stephen Apkon, and Nell Minow (film critic)
Bound	The Wachowskis	1996	Jennifer Tilly, Gina Gershon, Joe Pantoliano	Post-film Q&A included Tilly and Gershon
Cold War	Paweł Pawlikowski	2018	Joanna Kulig, Tomasz Kot	Post-film Q&A included Michael Phillips and Carla Renata (film critics)
Cane River	Horace B. Jenkins	1982	Richard Romain, Tommye Myrick	Post-film Q&A included Myrick and Sacha and Dominique Jenkins (children of director)
A Year of the Quiet Sun	Krzysztof Zanussi	1984	Maja Komorowska, Scott Wilson	Post-film Q&A included Komoroska and Heavenly Wilson (widow of lead male actor)
Romy and Michele's High School Reunion	David Mirkin	1997	Mira Sorvino, Lisa Kudrow	Post-film Q&A included Mirkin
Maya Angelou: And Still I Rise	Bob Hercules, Rita Coburn	2016	Maya Angelou	Post-film Q&A included Coburn
Won't You Be My Neighbor?	Morgan Neville	2018	Fred Rogers	Post-film Q&A included Neville
Almost Famous	Cameron Crowe	2000	Billy Crudup, Frances McDormand, Patrick Fugit, Kate Hudson	Post-film Q&A included Richard Roeper (film critic)
Sideways	Alexander Payne	2004	Paul Giamatti, Thomas Haden Church, Virginia Madsen	Post-film Q&A included Richard Roeper and Madsen via video call

=== 2018 ===
Festival schedule

Title	Director	Year	Starring	Notes
The Fugitive	Andrew Davis	1993	Harrison Ford, Tommy Lee Jones, Sela Ward	Post-film Q&A included Davis
Interstellar	Christopher Nolan	2014	Matthew McConaughey, Anne Hathaway, Jessica Chastain	Post-film Q&A included scientists Miguel Alcubierre and Brand Fortner
Selena	Gregory Nava	1997	Jennifer Lopez, Edward James Olmos	Post-film Q&A included Nava
Belle	Amma Asante	2013	Gugu Mbatha-Raw, Tom Wilkinson, Miranda Richardson, Penelope Wilton, Sam Reid, Matthew Goode, Emily Watson	Post-film Q&A included Asante
Columbus	Kogonada	2017	John Cho, Haley Lu Richardson, Parker Posey	Post-film Q&A included Kogonada and producers Bill Harnisch, Andrew Miano, Ruth Ann Harnisch, and Danielle Renfrew Behrens
A Page of Madness	Teinosuke Kinugasa	1926	Masao Inoue, Ayako Iijima, Yoshie Nakagawa	Alloy Orchestra played live accompaniment. Post-film Q&A included two members of the Alloy Orchestra
American Splendor	Shari Springer Berman and Robert Pulcini	2003	Paul Giamatti, Hope Davis, Judah Friedlander	Post-film Q&A included Berman, Pulcini, and producer Ted Hope
13th	Ava DuVernay	2016	documentary film	Post-film Q&A included DuVernay
Daughters of the Dust	Julie Dash	1991	Cora Lee Day, Barbara O, Alva Rogers	Post-film Q&A included Dash
Rambling Rose	Martha Coolidge	1991	Laura Dern, Robert Duvall, Diane Ladd	Post-film Q&A included Coolidge
The Big Lebowski	Joel and Ethan Coen	1998	Jeff Bridges, John Goodman, Julianne Moore, Steve Buscemi	Post-film Q&A included film subject Jeff Dowd
Rumble: The Indians Who Rocked the World	Catherine Bainbridge and Alfonso Maiorana	2017	documentary film	Post-film Q&A included Maiorana and Pura Fé. Live performance by Pura Fé followed the discussion.

=== 2017 ===
Festival schedule

Title	Director	Year	Starring	Notes
Hair	Miloš Forman	1979	John Savage, Treat Williams, Beverly D'Angelo	Post-film Q&A included Michael Hausman (first assistant director) and Michael Butler (producer)
Hysteria (2011 film)	Tanya Wexler	2011	Maggie Gyllenhaal, Hugh Dancy, Rupert Everett	Post-film Q&A included Wexler and Dancy
To Sleep with Anger	Charles Burnett	1990	Danny Glover, Paul Butler, Mary Alice	Post-film Q&A included Burnett and special guest Robert Townsend
The Handmaiden	Park Chan-wook	2016	Kim Min-hee, Kim Tae-ri, Ha Jung-woo, Cho Jin-woong	Post-film Q&A included a panel of film critics
July and Half of August (short)	Brandeaux Tourville	2017	Annika Marks, Robert Baker	Pre-film introduction included Sheila O'Malley (writer)
They Call Us Monsters	Ben Lear	2016		Post-film Q&A included Lear and Sasha Alpert (producer)
Varieté	Ewald Andre Dupont	1924	Emil Jannings, Maly Delschaft, Lya De Putti	Alloy Orchestra played live accompaniment. Post-film Q&A included film historian Richard Neupert
Elle	Paul Verhoeven	2016	Isabelle Huppert, Laurent Lafitte, Anne Consigny	Post-film Q&A included Huppert
Mind/Game: The Unquiet Journey of Chamique Holdsclaw	Rick Goldsmith	2015	Chamique Holdsclaw, Ron Artest, Glenn Close	Post-film Q&A included Goldsmith
Pleasantville	Gary Ross	1998	Tobey Maguire, Reese Witherspoon, Joan Allen, William H. Macy, Jeff Daniels	Post-film Q&A included Ross
Norman Lear: Just Another Version of You	Heidi Ewing, Rachel Grady	2016	Norman Lear, John Amos, Bea Arthur	Post-film Q&A included Lear, Grady, and Brent Miller (producer). Ewing was scheduled to appear but she was unable to attend.
Being There	Hal Ashby	1979	Peter Sellers, Shirley MacLaine, Melvyn Douglas	Post-film Q&A included Caleb Deschanel (cinematographer)
De-Lovely	Irwin Winkler	2004	Kevin Kline, Ashley Judd	Post-film Q&A included Winkler, his son Charles Winkler (producer) plus special musical guests Jimmy Demers and Donnie Demers

=== 2016 ===
Festival schedule

Title	Director	Year	Starring	Notes
Everybody Wants Some!!	Richard Linklater	2016	Blake Jenner, Tyler Hoechlin, Ryan Guzman	Free student screening on University of Illinois campus. Post-film Q&A included Stephen Feder (executive producer), Glen Powell (actor), and Juston Street (actor)
Crimson Peak	Guillermo del Toro	2015	Mia Wasikowska, Jessica Chastain, Tom Hiddleston	Post-film Q&A included del Toro
Grandma	Paul Weitz	2015	Lily Tomlin, Julia Garner, Marcia Gay Harden	Post-film Q&A included Weitz and Andrew Miano (producer)
Northfork	Michael Polish	2003	James Woods, Nick Nolte, Daryl Hannah, Anthony Edwards	Post-film Q&A included Polish
The Third Man	Carol Reed	1949	Joseph Cotten, Orson Welles, Alida Valli	Post-film Q&A included Angela Allen (script supervisor)
Disturbing the Peace	Stephen Apkon, Andrew Young	2016	Chen Alon, Sulaiman Khatib	Special premiere. Post-film Q&A included Apkon, Young, Alon, Khatib, and Marcina Hale (story consultant)
L'Inhumaine	Marcel L'Herbier	1924	Georgette Leblanc, Jaque Catelain, Philippe Hériat	Alloy Orchestra played live accompaniment. Post-film Q&A included two members of the Alloy Orchestra
Eve's Bayou	Kasi Lemmons	1997	Samuel L. Jackson, Lynn Whitfield, Jurnee Smollett	Post-film Q&A included Lemmons
Force of Destiny	Paul Cox	2015	David Wenham, Shahana Goswami, Jacqueline McKenzie	U.S. premiere. Post-film Q&A included Cox
Radical Grace	Rebecca Parrish	2015	Sister Simone Campbell, Sister Jean Hughes, Sister Chris Schenk	Post-film Q&A included Parrish, Nicole Bernardi-Reis (producer), Heather McIntosh (composer), and Father Michael Pfleger (social activist)
Love & Mercy	Bill Pohlad	2014	John Cusack, Paul Dano, Paul Giamatti, Elizabeth Banks	Post-film Q&A included panel of film critics
Blow Out	Brian De Palma	1981	John Travolta, Nancy Allen, John Lithgow	Post-film Q&A included Allen
Body and Soul	Oscar Micheaux	1925	Paul Robeson, Mercedes Gilbert, Julia Theresa Russell	Renee Baker and the Chicago Modern Orchestra Project played live accompaniment, composed by Baker. Post-film Q&A included Baker

=== 2015 ===
Festival schedule

Title	Director	Year	Starring	Notes
Goodbye to Language	Jean-Luc Godard	2014	Héloise Godet, Kamel Abdeli, Richard Chevalier	Post-film Q&A included Godet
A Pigeon Sat on a Branch Reflecting on Existence	Roy Andersson	2014	Holger Andersson, Nils Westblom, Viktor Gyllenberg	Post-film Q&A included Johan Carlsson (producer)
Moving Midway	Godfrey Cheshire	2008	Godfrey Cheshire, Robert Hinton	Post-film Q&A included Cheshire, plus Hinton via video call
The End of the Tour	James Ponsoldt	2015	Jason Segel, Jesse Eisenberg, Ron Livingston	Post-film Q&A included Ponsoldt and Segel
Girlhood	Céline Sciamma	2014	Karidja Touré, Assa Sylla, Lindsay Karamoh	Post-film Q&A included Héloise Godet
The Son of the Sheik	George Fitzmaurice	1926	Rudolph Valentino, Vilma Bánky, George Fawcett	Alloy Orchestra played live accompaniment. Post-film Q&A included two members of the Alloy Orchestra
A Bronx Tale	Robert De Niro	1993	Robert De Niro, Chazz Palminteri, Lillo Brancato, Jr.	Post-film Q&A included Palminteri, Jon Kilik (producer), Richard Roeper (critic) and Leonard Maltin (critic)
Wild Tales	Damián Szifrón	2014	Darío Grandinetti, María Marull, Julieta Zylberberg	Post-film Q&A included Zylberberg, Javier Braier (casting director), plus Szifrón via video call
Ida	Paweł Pawlikowski	2013	Agata Kulesza, Agata Trzebuchowska, Dawid Ogrodnik	Post-film Q&A included panel of film critics
The Motel Life	Alan Polsky, Gabe Polsky	2012	Emile Hirsch, Stephen Dorff, Dakota Fanning, Kris Kristofferson	Post-film Q&A included Alan Polsky
99 Homes	Ramin Bahrani	2014	Andrew Garfield, Michael Shannon, Laura Dern	Post-film Q&A included Bahrani and Noah Lomax (actor)
Seymour: An Introduction	Ethan Hawke	2014	Seymour Bernstein, Jiyang Chen, Ethan Hawke	Post-film Q&A included Bernstein, Andrew Harvey (activist), and Leonard Maltin (critic)

=== 2014 ===
Festival schedule

Title	Director	Year	Starring	Notes
The Taking of Pelham One, Two, Three	Joseph Sargent	1974	Walter Matthau, Robert Shaw, Martin Balsam	Free student screening on University of Illinois campus. Post-film Q&A included Patton Oswalt
Life Itself	Steve James	2014	Roger Ebert, Chaz Ebert, Gene Siskel	Post-film Q&A included James and Chaz Ebert
Museum Hours	Jem Cohen	2012	Mary Margaret O'Hara, Bobby Sommer, Ela Piplits	Post-film Q&A included Cohen
Short Term 12	Destin Cretton	2013	Brie Larson, John Gallagher, Jr., Frantz Turner	Post-film Q&A included Larson
Young Adult	Jason Reitman	2011	Charlize Theron, Patton Oswalt, Patrick Wilson	Post-film Q&A included Oswalt
He Who Gets Slapped	Victor Sjöström	1924	Lon Chaney, Norma Shearer, John Gilbert	2011 restoration. Alloy Orchestra played live accompaniment. Post-film Q&A included two members of the Alloy Orchestra
Capote	Bennett Miller	2004	Philip Seymour Hoffman, Catherine Keener, Clifton Collins, Jr.	Pre-film introduction included Michael Barker (distributor)
Do The Right Thing	Spike Lee	1989	Danny Aiello, Ossie Davis, Ruby Dee, Spike Lee	Post-film Q&A included Lee
Wadjda	Haifaa Al-Mansour	2012	Waad Mohammed, Reem Abdullah, Abdullrahman Al Gohani	Post-film Q&A included Al-Mansour
A Simple Life	Ann Hui	2011	Andy Lau, Deanie Ip, Paul Chun, Fuli Wang	Post-film Q&A included Hui
Goodbye Solo	Ramin Bahrani	2008	Souleymane Sy Savane, Red West, Diana Franco Galindo	Post-film Q&A included Bahrani
Born on the Fourth of July	Oliver Stone	1989	Tom Cruise, Willem Dafoe, Raymond J. Barry, Caroline Kava	Post-film Q&A included Stone
Bayou Maharajah	Lily Keber	2013	James Booker, Dr. John, Harry Connick, Jr.	Post-film Q&A included Keber, Henry Butler

=== 2013 ===
Festival schedule

Title	Director	Year	Starring	Notes
Days of Heaven	Terrence Malick	1978	Richard Gere, Brooke Adams, Sam Shepard, Linda Manz	Post-film Q&A included Haskell Wexler (cinematographer)
I Remember (short)	Grace Wang	2012	Lily Huang, Chris Chang	Pre-film introduction included Wang and June Kim (director of photography)
Vincent: The Life and Death of Vincent Van Gogh	Paul Cox	1989	John Hurt, Marika Rivera, Gabriella Trsek	
To Music (short)	Sophie Kohn, Feike Santbergen	2013	Paul Cox, Roger Glanville-Hicks, Henriett Tunyogi, Tamás Vásáry	Pre-film introduction included Kohn and Santbergen
In the Family	Patrick Wang	2012	Sebastian Banes, Patrick Wang, Trevor St. John	Post-film Q&A included Wang and St. John
Bernie	Richard Linklater	2011	Jack Black, Shirley MacLaine, Matthew McConaughey	Post-film Q&A included Linklater and Black (via conference call)
Oslo, August 31st	Joachim Trier	2011	Anders Danielsen Lie	Post-film Q&A included Trier
The Ballad of Narayama	Keisuke Kinoshita	1958	Kinuyo Tanaka, Teiji Takahashi, Yūko Mochizuki	Post-film Q&A included David Bordwell (film historian)
Julia	Erick Zonca	2008	Tilda Swinton, Aidan Gould, Saul Rubinek, Kate del Castillo	Post-film Q&A included Swinton
Blancanieves	Pablo Berger	2012	Maribel Verdú	Post-film Q&A included Berger
Kumaré	Vikram Gandhi	2011	Vikram Gandhi	Post-film Q&A included Gandhi
Escape from Tomorrow	Randy Moore	2013	Roy Abramsohn, Elena Schuber, Katelynn Rodriguez, Annet Mahendru, Danielle Safady, Alison Lees-Taylor	Post-film Q&A included Moore, Soojin Chung (producer), Abramsohn, Schuber, Mahendru
The Spectacular Now	James Ponsoldt	2013	Miles Teller, Shailene Woodley, Brie Larson, Jennifer Jason Leigh, Mary Elizabeth Winstead, Kyle Chandler	Post-film Q&A included Ponsoldt and Woodley
Not Yet Begun to Fight	Sabrina Lee, Shasta Grenier	2012	Navy SEAL Elliott Miller, Sgt. Erik Goodge, Col. Eric Hastings	Post-film Q&A included Lee and Goodge

=== 2012 ===
Festival schedule

Title	Director	Year	Starring	Notes
Joe Versus the Volcano	John Patrick Shanley	1990	Tom Hanks, Meg Ryan, Lloyd Bridges, Abe Vigoda	Post-film Q&A included Stephen Goldblatt (director of photography)
The Truth About Beauty & Blogs (short)	Rosalyn Coleman Williams	2011	Kelechie Ezie	Post-film Q&A included Kelechie Ezie, also writer and co-producer
Phunny Business: A Black Comedy	John Davies	2011	Raymond Lambert	Post-film Q&A included John Davies, Reid Brody (producer), Raymond Lambert (also writer and producer), Ali LeRoi (comedian featured in film)
Big Fan	Robert Siegel	2009	Patton Oswalt, Kevin Corrigan, Michael Rapaport	Post-film Q&A included Robert Siegel. Patton Oswalt was scheduled to attend, as well as introduce a public screening of Kind Hearts and Coronets, but was detained by filming commitments
Kinyarwanda	Alrick Brown	2011	Hassan Kabera, Edouard Bamporiki, Cassandra Freeman	Post-film Q&A included Alrick Brown, Ishmael Ntihabose (actor and executive producer), Darren Dean (producer), Tommy Oliver (producer), Deatra Harris (producer)
Terri	Azazel Jacobs	2011	Jacob Wysocki	Post-film Q&A included Azazel Jacobs and Jacob Wysocki
On Borrowed Time	David Bradbury	2011	Paul Cox	Paul Cox
Wild AND Weird: The Alloy Orchestra Plays 10 Fascinating and Innovative Films 1906–1926		1906–1926		Alloy Orchestra played live accompaniment
A Separation	Asghar Farhadi	2011	Peyman Mouadi, Leila Hatami, Sareh Bayat, Shahab Hosseini, Sarina Farhadi	Peyman Mouadi was scheduled to attend but did not. The post-film Q&A, moderated by blogger Nell Minow, included Paul Cox, blogger Omer Mozaffar and distributor Michael Barker
Higher Ground	Vera Farmiga	2011	Vera Farmiga, Joshua Leonard, Norbert Leo Butz, Donna Murphy	Post-film Q&A included writer Carolyn S. Briggs, who based the film on her memoir This Dark World, with blogger Nell Minow
Patang (The Kite)	Prashant Bhargava	2011	Seema Biswas, Nawazuddin Siddiqui	Post-film Q&A included Prashant Bhargava, Vijay Bhargava (executive producer), James Townsend (writer), Seema Biswas, Nawazuddin Siddiqui
Take Shelter	Jeff Nichols	2011	Michael Shannon, Jessica Chastain	Post-film Q&A included Jeff Nichols, Michael Shannon and distributor Michael Barker
Citizen Kane	Orson Welles	1941	Orson Welles, Joseph Cotten, Dorothy Comingore, Ruth Warrick	The film was shown using Roger Ebert's commentary track, recorded in 2006 (before Ebert lost his voice). The post-show Q&A featured scholar David Bordwell with audio commentary producer Jeffrey Lerner. Chaz Ebert was visibly moved, stating that although she had seen the film, she had never heard the commentary track, and felt lucky to hear her husband's voice again in the Virginia Theatre

=== 2011 ===
Festival schedule

Title	Director	Year	Starring	Notes
Metropolis	Fritz Lang	1927	Brigitte Helm, Gustav Fröhlich, Alfred Abel, Rudolf Klein-Rogge	2010 restoration. Alloy Orchestra played live accompaniment
Natural Selection	Robbie Pickering	2010	Rachael Harris	Post-film Q&A included Robbie Pickering and Rachael Harris
Umberto D	Vittorio De Sica	1952	Carlo Battisti	Post-film Q&A included Ignatiy Vishnevetsky and Omer Mozaffar
My Dog Tulip	Paul Fierlinger and Sandra Schuette Fierlinger	2010	Christopher Plummer (narrator)	Post-film Q&A included Paul Fierlinger and Sandra Schuette Fierlinger
Tiny Furniture	Lena Dunham	2010	Lena Dunham, Laurie Simmons, Grace Dunham, Alex Karpovsky, David Call	Post-film Q&A included David Call and distributor Ryan Werner
45365	Turner Ross and Bill Ross IV	2009	Townspeople of Sidney, Ohio	Post-film Q&A included Turner Ross and Bill Ross IV
Me & Orson Welles	Richard Linklater	2009	Christian McKay, Claire Danes, Zac Efron	Post-film Q&A included Richard Linklater
Only You	Norman Jewison	1994	Robert Downey, Jr., Marisa Tomei, Bonnie Hunt	Post-film Q&A included Norman Jewison
A Small Act	Jennifer Arnold	2010	Chris Mburu, Jane Wanjiru Muigai, Hilde Back	Post-film Q&A included Jennifer Arnold, Hilde Back and producer Patti Lee
Life Above All	Oliver Schmitz	2010	Khomotso Manyaka, Keaobaka Makanyane, Harriet Lenabe	Post-film Q&A included Oliver Schmitz, Khomotso Manyaka and Michael Barker
Leaves of Grass	Tim Blake Nelson	2009	Edward Norton, Tim Blake Nelson, Susan Sarandon	Post-film Q&A included Tim Blake Nelson
I Am Love	Luca Guadagnino	2010	Tilda Swinton, Flavio Parenti, Edoardo Gabbriellini, Marisa Berenson	Post-film Q&A included Tilda Swinton and Michael Barker
Louder Than a Bomb	Jon Siskel and Greg Jacobs	2010	Kevin Coval, Adam Gottlieb, Elizabeth Graf, Kevin Harris and other students	Post-film Q&A included Jon Siskel, Greg Jacobs, founder and artistic director Kevin Coval and Steinmetz High School poets Lamar Jorden, Charles Smith, She'Kira McNight, Kevin Harris and Jésus Lark

=== 2010 ===
Festival schedule

Title	Director	Year	Starring	Notes
Pink Floyd – The Wall	Alan Parker	1982	Bob Geldof, Christine Hargreaves, James Laurenson	Post-film Q&A included panel of film critics. Roger Ebert spoke using computer voice software after the showing.
You, the Living	Roy Andersson	2007	Elisabeth Helander, Jugge Nohall, Jessika Lundberg	Lundberg and Johan Carlsson (production manager) were scheduled to appear but did not due to travel problems. Post-film Q&A included panel of film critics
Munyurangabo	Lee Isaac Chung	2007	Jeff Rutagengwa, Eric Ndorunkundiye, Jean Marie Vianney Nkurikiyinka	Post-film Q&A included Chung, Sam Anderson (co-writer & producer), Jenny Lund (co-producer)
The New Age	Michael Tolkin	1994	Peter Weller, Judy Davis, Patrick Bauchau	Post-film Q&A included Tolkin
Apocalypse Now/Redux	Francis Ford Coppola	2001	Martin Sheen, Marlon Brando, Robert Duvall	Extended version of the 1979 film. Walter Murch (sound design & film editor) was scheduled to appear but did not due to travel problems. Post-film Q&A included panel of film critics
Departures	Yōjirō Takita	2008	Masahiro Motoki, Ryōko Hirosue, Tsutomu Yamazaki	Post-film Q&A included Takita
Man with a Movie Camera	Dziga Vertov	1929	Mikhail Kaufman	2010 restoration. Alloy Orchestra played live accompaniment. Post-film Q&A included two members of the Alloy Orchestra
Synecdoche, New York	Charlie Kaufman	2008	Philip Seymour Hoffman, Samantha Morton, Michelle Williams	Pre-film introduction by Roger Ebert using speech software on computer. Post-film Q&A included Kaufman and Anthony Bregman (producer)
I Capture the Castle	Tim Fywell	2003	Romola Garai, Rose Byrne, Bill Nighy	Nighy was scheduled to appear but did not due to travel problems. Post-film Q&A included panel of film critics
Vincent: A Life In Color	Jennifer Burns	2008	Vincent P. Falk	Post-film Q&A included Burns and Falk
Trucker	James Mottern	2008	Michelle Monaghan, Nathan Fillion, Benjamin Bratt	Post-film Q&A included Mottern and Monaghan
Barfly	Barbet Schroeder	1987	Mickey Rourke, Faye Dunaway, Alice Krige	Post-film Q&A included Schroeder
Song Sung Blue	Greg Kohs	2008	Mike Sardina, Claire Sardina	Post film Q&A included Kohs and Claire Sardina

=== 2009 ===
Festival schedule

Title	Director	Year	Starring	Notes
Woodstock: 3 Days of Peace and Music, The Director's Cut	Michael Wadleigh	1994	Crosby, Stills & Nash, The Who, Jimi Hendrix, Joan Baez	Extended version of the 1970 film. Post-film Q&A included Wadleigh, Dale Bell (producer), Jocko Marcellino (musician)
My Winnipeg	Guy Maddin	2007	Darcy Fehr, Ann Savage, Louis Negin	Post-film Q&A included Maddin
Chop Shop	Ramin Bahrani	2007	Alejandro Polanco, Isamar Gonzales, Rob Sowulski	Post-film Q&A included Bahrani
Trouble the Water	Tia Lessin, Carl Deal	2008	Kimberly Rivers Roberts, Scott Roberts	Post-film Q&A included Lessin, Deal, K. Roberts, and S. Roberts
Begging Naked	Karen Gehres	2007	Elise Bainbridge Hill, Sally Roth	Post-film Q&A included Gehres
The Last Command	Josef von Sternberg	1928	Emil Jannings, Evelyn Brent, William Powell	Alloy Orchestra played live accompaniment. Post-film Q&A included all three members of the Alloy Orchestra
Frozen River	Courtney Hunt	2008	Melissa Leo, Misty Upham, Charlie McDermott	Post-film Q&A included Hunt and Upham
The Fall	Tarsem Singh	2006	Lee Pace, Catinca Untaru, Justine Waddell	Post-film Q&A included Untaru
Sita Sings The Blues	Nina Paley	2008	Sanjiv Jhaveri, Nina Paley, Deepti Gupta	Post-film Q&A included Paley
Nothing But The Truth	Rod Lurie	2008	Kate Beckinsale, Matt Dillon, Vera Farmiga	Post-film Q&A included Lurie and Dillon
Let The Right One In	Tomas Alfredson	2008	Kåre Hedebrant, Lina Leandersson, Per Ragnar	Post-film Q&A included Carl Molinder (producer)
Baraka	Ron Fricke	1992	n/a	Post film Q&A included Fricke and Mark Magidson (producer)

=== 2008 ===
Festival schedule

Title	Director	Year	Starring	Notes
Hamlet	Kenneth Branagh	1996	Kenneth Branagh, Julie Christie, Derek Jacobi	Post-film Q&A included actors Timothy Spall and Rufus Sewell
Delirious	Tom DiCillo	2006	Steve Buscemi, Michael Pitt, Alison Lohman	Post-film Q&A included DiCillo
Yes	Sally Potter	2004	Joan Allen, Simon Abkarian, Sam Neill	Post-film Q&A included John Penotti (executive producer)
Citizen Cohl: The Untold Story (short)	Barry Avrich	2008	Barry Avrich, Dusty Cohl, Michael Cohl	Post-film Q&A included Avrich
Canvas	Joseph Greco	2006	Joe Pantoliano, Marcia Gay Harden, Devon Gearhart	Post-film Q&A included Greco, Pantoliano, Adam Hammel (producer), Bill Erfurth (producer)
Shotgun Stories	Jeff Nichols	2007	Michael Shannon, Douglas Ligon	Post-film Q&A included Nichols
Underworld	Josef von Sternberg	1927	Clive Brook, Evelyn Brent, George Bancroft, Larry Semon	Alloy Orchestra played live accompaniment. Post-film Q&A was scheduled to include members of the Alloy Orchestra
The Real Dirt on Farmer John	Taggart Siegel	2005	John Peterson, Anna Nielsen, John Edwards	Post-film Q&A included Siegel and Peterson
Mishima: A Life in Four Chapters	Paul Schrader	1985	Ken Ogata, Masayuki Shionoya	Post-film Q&A included Schrader and Eiko Ishioka (costume designer)
Hulk	Ang Lee	2003	Eric Bana, Jennifer Connelly, Sam Elliott	Post-film Q&A included Lee
The Band's Visit	Eran Kolirin	2007	Sasson Gabai, Ronit Elkabetz, Saleh Bakri	Post-film Q&A included Kolirin
Housekeeping	Bill Forsyth	1987	Christine Lahti, Sara Walker, Andrea Burchill	Post-film Q&A included Forsyth and Lahti
The Cell	Tarsem Singh	2000	Jennifer Lopez, Vince Vaughn, Vincent D'Onofrio	Post film Q&A included Singh, Eiko Ishioka (costume designer), and Nico Soultanakis (producer)
Romance & Cigarettes	John Turturro	2005	James Gandolfini, Susan Sarandon, Kate Winslet	Post film Q&A Aida Turturro (actor) and Tricia Brouk (choreographer)

=== 2007 ===
Festival schedule

Title	Director	Year	Starring	Notes
Gattaca	Andrew Niccol	1997	Ethan Hawke, Uma Thurman	Post-film Q&A included Michael Shamberg (producer)
The Weather Man	Gore Verbinski	2005	Nicolas Cage, Hope Davis, Michael Caine	Post-film Q&A included Steven Conrad (writer) and Gil Bellows (actor)
Moolaadé	Ousmane Sembène	2004	Fatoumata Coulibaly, Maimouna Hélène Diarra, Salimata Traoré	Post-film Q&A included Coulibaly and Samba Gadjigo (professor)
Perfume: The Story of a Murderer	Tom Tykwer	2006	Ben Whishaw, Alan Rickman, Rachel Hurd-Wood, Dustin Hoffman	Post-film Q&A included Rickman
Sadie Thompson	Raoul Walsh	1928	Gloria Swanson, Lionel Barrymore	Champaign-Urbana Symphony Orchestra played live accompaniment. Post-film Q&A included David Bordwell (film scholar), Steven Larsen (conductor), and Joseph Turrin (composer)
Come Early Morning	Joey Lauren Adams	2006	Ashley Judd, Jeffrey Donovan	Post-film Q&A included Adams and Scott Wilson (actor)
La Dolce Vita	Federico Fellini	1960	Marcello Mastroianni, Anita Ekberg, Anouk Aimée	Post-film Q&A included Michael Barker (producer & distributor) and Jacqueline Reich (professor)
Freddie Mercury: the Untold Story	Rudi Dolezal, Hannes Rossacher	2000	Freddie Mercury, Jer Bulsara, Kashmira Cooke	Post-film Q&A included Dolezal
Holes	Andrew Davis	2003	Shia LaBeouf, Sigourney Weaver, Jon Voight	Post-film Q&A included Davis
Man of Flowers	Paul Cox	1983	Norman Kaye, Alyson Best, Chris Haywood	Post-film Q&A included Cox and Werner Herzog (actor)
Stroszek	Werner Herzog	1977	Bruno S., Eva Mattes, Clemens Scheitz	Post-film Q&A included Herzog
Searching for the Wrong-Eyed Jesus	Andrew Douglas	2003	Jim White, Harry Crews, Johnny Dowd	Post-film Q&A was scheduled to include Douglas and White
Beyond the Valley of the Dolls	Russ Meyer	1970	Dolly Read, Cynthia Myers, Marcia McBroom	Post film Q&A included Strawberry Alarm Clock (band) and was scheduled to include McBroom and Peter Sobcynski (critic)

=== 2006 ===
Festival schedule

Title	Director	Year	Starring	Notes
My Fair Lady	George Cukor	1964	Audrey Hepburn, Rex Harrison	1994 restoration. Post-film Q&A included Marni Nixon (singing voice), Robert A. Harris (film restorer), Jim Katz (restorer/producer)
Man Push Cart	Ramin Bahrani	2005	Ahmad Razvi, Leticia Dolera, Charles Daniel Sandoval	Post-film Q&A included Bahrani and Razvi
Duane Hopwood	Matt Mulhern	2005	David Schwimmer, Janeane Garofalo	Post-film Q&A included Mulhern
Spartan	David Mamet	2004	Val Kilmer, Derek Luke, William H. Macy, Kristen Bell	Post-film Q&A included David Bordwell (film scholar)
Somebodies	Hadjii	2006	Kaira Whitehead, Tyler Craig, Patt Brown, Nard Holston	Post-film Q&A included Hadjii, Whitehead, Nate Kohn (co-producer), Pam Kohn (co-producer)
The Eagle	Clarence Brown	1925	Rudolph Valentino, Vilma Bánky, Louise Dresser	Alloy Orchestra played live accompaniment. Post-film Q&A included a panel of film professors
Ripley's Game	Liliana Cavani	2002	John Malkovich, Dougray Scott, Ray Winstone, Lena Headey	Post-film Q&A included Malkovich and Russell Smith (executive producer)
Millions	Danny Boyle	2004	Alex Etel, Lewis McGibbon, James Nesbitt, Daisy Donovan	Post-film Q&A included a panel of local children
Claire Dolan	Lodge Kerrigan	1998	Katrin Cartlidge, Vincent D'Onofrio, Colm Meaney	Post-film Q&A included Kerrigan
Junebug	Phil Morrison	2005	Embeth Davidtz, Amy Adams, Benjamin McKenzie, Scott Wilson	Post-film Q&A included Morrison, Wilson, and Michael Barker (distributor)
Bad Santa	Terry Zwigoff	2003	Billy Bob Thornton, Bernie Mac, Lauren Graham	Director's personal print of the film that included unreleased material. Post-film Q&A included Zwigoff
U-Carmen eKhayelitsha	Mark Dornford-May	2005	Pauline Malefane, Andile Tshoni, Lungelwa Blou	Post-film Q&A included Dornford-May and Malefane

=== 2005 ===
Festival schedule

Title	Director	Year	Starring	Notes
Playtime	Jacques Tati	1967	Jacques Tati, Barbara Dennek	Post-film Q&A included Jonathan Rosenbaum (film critic)
Murderball	Henry Alex Rubin, Dana Adam Shapiro	2005	Joe Soares, Keith Cavill, Mark Zupan	Post-film Q&A included Rubin, Shapiro, Zupan, Soares, and Jeff Mandel (producer)
The Heart of the World (short)	Guy Maddin	2000	Leslie Bais, Caelum Vatnsdal, Shaun Balbar	Post-film Q&A included Maddin and Jonathan Sehring (producer)
The Saddest Music in the World	Guy Maddin	2003	Isabella Rossellini, Mark McKinney, Maria de Medeiros	Post-film Q&A included Maddin and Jonathan Sehring (producer)
After Dark, My Sweet	James Foley	1990	Jason Patric, Rachel Ward, Bruce Dern	Post-film Q&A included Patric
Yesterday	Darrell Roodt	2004	Leleti Khumalo, Lihle Mvelase, Kenneth Khambula	Post-film Q&A included Roodt
The Phantom of the Opera	Rupert Julian	1925	Lon Chaney, Mary Philbin, Norman Kerry	Alloy Orchestra played live accompaniment. Post-film Q&A included members of the Alloy Orchestra and Jonathan Rosenbaum (film critic)
Baadasssss!	Mario Van Peebles	2003	Mario Van Peebles, Nia Long, Joy Bryant	Post-film Q&A included Van Peebles
The Secret of Roan Inish	John Sayles	1994	Jeni Courtney, Eileen Colgan, Richard Sheridan	Post-film Q&A included Sayles and Maggie Renzi (producer)
Primer	Shane Carruth	2004	Shane Carruth, David Sullivan	Post-film Q&A included Carruth
Map of the Human Heart	Vincent Ward	1993	Jason Scott Lee, Anne Parillaud, Patrick Bergin	Post-film Q&A included Ward and Lee
Me and You and Everyone We Know	Miranda July	2005	John Hawkes, Miranda July, Miles Thompson	Post-film Q&A included July and Jonathan Sehring (producer)
Taal	Subhash Ghai	1999	Anil Kapoor, Akshaye Khanna, Aishwarya Rai Bachchan	Post-film Q&A included Ghai and Gerson da Cunha (film journalist)

=== 2004 ===
Festival schedule

Title	Director	Year	Starring	Notes
Lawrence of Arabia	David Lean	1962	Peter O'Toole, Alec Guinness, Anthony Quinn	1989 restoration. Pre-film introduction included Jack Valenti (head of MPAA). Post-film Q&A included Robert Harris (film restorer) and Anne Coates (film editor)
Tarnation	Jonathan Caouette	2003	Jonathan Caouette, Renee Leblanc, Adolph Davis	Post-film Q&A included Caouette
The Son	Jean-Pierre Dardenne and Luc Dardenne	2002	Olivier Gourmet, Morgan Marinne, Isabella Soupart	Post-film Q&A was scheduled to include Dan Talbot (art film distributor)
Once Upon a Time...When We Were Colored	Tim Reid	1995	Al Freeman Jr., Phylicia Rashad, Leon	Post-film Q&A included Tim Reid
Tully	Hilary Birmingham	2000	Glenn Fitzgerald, Anson Mount, Bob Burrus, Julianne Nicholson	Post-film Q&A included Birmingham and Mount
The Scapegoat (short)	Darren Ng	2003	Darren Ng, Scott Honey, Cassandra Chan	Post-film Q&A included Ng and Jeffrey Vance (film historian)
The General	Clyde Bruckman, Buster Keaton	1926	Buster Keaton, Marion Mack	Alloy Orchestra played live accompaniment. Post-film Q&A included Darren Ng and Jeffrey Vance (film historian)
El Norte	Gregory Nava	1983	Zaide Silvia Gutiérrez, David Villalpando	Post-film Q&A included Nava and Anna Thomas (producer)
My Dog Skip	Jay Russell	2000	Frankie Muniz, Diane Lane, Kevin Bacon, Luke Wilson	Post-film Q&A included Russell, Enzo (dog actor), and Larry Madrid (dog trainer)
Gates of Heaven	Errol Morris	1978	Floyd McClure, Cal Harberts, Florence Rasmussen	Post-film Q&A included Morris
People I Know	Dan Algrant	2002	Al Pacino, Kim Basinger, Téa Leoni	Post-film Q&A included Algrant, Bobby Zarem (publicist), and Pacino via telephone
Invincible	Werner Herzog	2001	Tim Roth, Jouko Ahola, Anna Gourari	Post-film Q&A included Herzog
Louie Bluie	Terry Zwigoff	1985	Howard Armstrong, Ted Bogan, Jay Lynch	Post-film Q&A was scheduled to include Barbara Ward Armstrong (wife of subject)
Sweet Old Song	Leah Mahan	2002	Howard Armstrong, Ray DeForest, Bob Frank	Post-film Q&A was scheduled to include Mahan and Barbara Ward Armstrong (wife of subject)

=== 2003 ===
Festival schedule

Title	Director	Year	Starring	Notes
The Right Stuff	Philip Kaufman	1983	Sam Shepard, Ed Harris, Scott Glenn	Post-film Q&A included Scott Wilson, Veronica Cartwright, and Donald Moffat (actors)
Stone Reader	Mark Moskowitz	2002	Carl Brandt, Frank Conroy, Bruce Dobler	Post-film Q&A included Moskowitz, Dow Mossman (film subject), and Jeff Lipsky (film distributor)
The Grey Automobile	Enrique Rosas	1919	Joaquin Coss, Juan de Homs, Manuel de los Rios	Performance based on the Japanese Benshi tradition of live actors narrating silent films. Post-film Q&A included Claudio Valdés Kuri (theatre director), Irene Akiko Iida (actress), and Ernesto Gómez Santana (pianist)
Your Friends and Neighbors	Neil LaBute	1998	Amy Brenneman, Aaron Eckhart, Catherine Keener	Post-film Q&A included LaBute
Blood and Wine	Bob Rafelson	1996	Jack Nicholson, Stephen Dorff, Jennifer Lopez	Post-film Q&A included Rafelson
Medium Cool	Haskell Wexler	1969	Robert Forster, Verna Bloom, Peter Bonerz	Post-film Q&A included Wexler
What's Cooking?	Gurinder Chadha	2000	Joan Chen, Juliana Margulies, Mercedes Ruehl, Kyra Sedgwick, Alfre Woodard	Post-film Q&A included Chaz Ebert
The Black Pirate	Albert Parker	1926	Douglas Fairbanks, Billie Dove, Tempe Pigott	Alloy Orchestra played live accompaniment.
L.627	Bertrand Tavernier	1992	Didier Bezace, Jean-Paul Comart, Charlotte Kady	Post-film Q&A included Tavernier
The Golden Age of Silent Comedy	Presented by the Silent Movie Theatre Co.	n/a	Harold Lloyd in Never Weaken, The Little Rascals in Saturday's Lesson, Buster Keaton in The Scarecrow, Charley Chase in Mighty Like a Moose, Charlie Chaplin in Kid Auto Races, and the Felix the Cat cartoon Felix Finds 'Em Fickle	Presentation included a vaudeville opening act, followed by six comedy short films. Dena Mora played organ and piano. Post-film Q&A included Charlie Lustman (theatre owner) and Mora
Shall We Dance?	Masayuki Suo	1996	Kōji Yakusho, Tamiyo Kusakari, Naoto Takenaka	Post-film Q&A included David Bordwell (film historian)
Charlotte Sometimes	Eric Byler	2002	Jacqueline Kim, Eugenia Yuan, Michael Idemoto	Launch festival release. Post-film Q&A included Byler, Kim, Idemoto, and John Manulis (executive producer)
13 Conversations About One Thing	Jill Sprecher	2001	Alan Arkin, John Turturro, Matthew McConaughey, Clea DuVall	Post-film Q&A included Jill Sprecher and Karen Sprecher (writer)
Singin' in the Rain	Stanley Donen, Gene Kelly	1952	Gene Kelly, Donald O'Connor, Debbie Reynolds	Post-film Q&A included O'Connor

=== 2002 ===
Festival schedule

Title	Director	Year	Starring	Notes
Patton	Franklin J. Schaffner	1970	George C. Scott, Karl Malden	Post-film Q&A included Dr. Richard Vetter (developer of optical system for 70 mm photography and projection)
Hyènes	Djibril Diop Mambéty	1992	Ami Kiakhate, Djibril Diop Mambéty, Mansour Diouf	
George Washington	David Gordon Green	2000	Candace Evanofski, Donald Holden, Damian Jewan Lee	Post-film Q&A included Green and Curtis Cotton III (actor)
Wonder Boys	Curtis Hanson	2000	Michael Douglas, Tobey Maguire, Frances McDormand	Post-film Q&A included Michael Chabon (novelist)
A Soldier's Daughter Never Cries	James Ivory	1998	Kris Kristofferson, Barbara Hershey, Leelee Sobieski	Post-film Q&A included Kristofferson and Kaylie Jones (novelist)
Kwik Stop	Michael Gilio	2001	Michael Gilio, Lara Phillips, Rich Komenich	Post-film Q&A included Gilio
Two Women	Tahmineh Milani	1999	Niki Karimi, Mohammad Reza Forutan, Merila Zarei	Post-film Q&A included Milani
Innocence	Paul Cox	2000	Julia Blake, Bud Tingwell, Kristine Van Pellicom	Post-film Q&A included Cox and Paul Grabowsky (composer)
Grand Canyon	Lawrence Kasdan	1991	Danny Glover, Kevin Kline, Steve Martin	Post-film Q&A was scheduled to include Alfre Woodard (actor)
Paperhouse	Bernard Rose	1988	Charlotte Burke, Ben Cross, Glenne Headly	Post-film Q&A included Rose
Diamond Men	Dan Cohen	2000	Robert Forster, Donnie Wahlberg	Post-film Q&A included Cohen and Forster
Metropolis	Fritz Lang	1927	Brigitte Helm, Alfred Abel, Gustav Fröhlich	Alloy Orchestra played live accompaniment
Metropolis	Rintaro	2001	Yuka Imoto, Kei Kobayashi, Kōsei Tomita,	Post-film Q&A was scheduled to include Drew McWeeny (film critic)
Say Amen, Somebody	George T. Nierenberg	1982	Willie Mae Ford Smith, Thomas A. Dorsey, DeLois Barrett Campbell	Post-film Q&A included Nierenberg and The Barrett Sisters

=== 2001 ===
Festival schedule

Title	Director	Year	Starring	Notes
2001: A Space Odyssey	Stanley Kubrick	1968	Keir Dullea, Gary Lockwood	Post-film Q&A included Dullea and Sir Arthur C. Clarke (writer, via telephone from Sri Lanka)
Stanley Kubrick: A Life in Pictures	Jan Harlan	2001	Katharina Kubrick, Malcolm McDowell, Stanley Kubrick	U.S. premiere. Post-film Q&A included Harlan
Maryam	Ramin Serry	2002	Mariam Parris, David Ackert, Shaun Toub	Post-film Q&A included Serry and Shauna Lyon (producer)
Such a Long Journey	Sturla Gunnarsson	1998	Roshan Seth, Soni Razdan, Om Puri	Post-film Q&A included Gunnarsson
Songs from the Second Floor	Roy Andersson	2000	Lars Nordh, Stefan Larsson, Bengt C.W. Carlsson	Post-film Q&A was scheduled to include Nordh
Panic	Henry Bromell	2000	William H. Macy, Neve Campbell, Donald Sutherland	Post-film Q&A was scheduled to include Bromell, but he was unable to attend due to illness
Girl on the Bridge	Patrice Leconte	1999	Vanessa Paradis, Daniel Auteuil	Post-film Q&A included Edwin Jahiel (film critic)
Dragonflies, the Baby Cries (short)	Jane Gillooly	2000	Jillian Wheeler, Jessy Rowe	Post-film Q&A was scheduled to include Gillooly
Nosferatu	F. W. Murnau	1922	Max Schreck, Gustav von Wangenheim, Greta Schröder	Alloy Orchestra played live accompaniment. Post-film Q&A included members of the Alloy Orchestra
3 Women	Robert Altman	1977	Shelley Duvall, Sissy Spacek, Janice Rule	Post-film Q&A was scheduled to include Rule
The King of Masks	Wu Tianming	1996	Zhu Xu, Zhou Renying, Zhao Zhigang	Post-film Q&A included Wu
On the Ropes	Nanette Burstein, Brett Morgen	1999	Sam Doumit, Martin Goldman, Harry Keitt	Post-film Q&A included Morgen and Tyrene Manson (subject, via telephone)
Jesus' Son	Alison Maclean	1999	Billy Crudup, Samantha Morton, Denis Leary, Holly Hunter, Dennis Hopper	Post-film Q&A included Crudup, and was scheduled to include Maclean, Elizabeth Cuthrell (producer and writer), and David Urrutia (producer and writer)
A Simple Plan	Sam Raimi	1998	Bill Paxton, Billy Bob Thornton, Bridget Fonda	Post-film Q&A included Paxton
Everyone Says I Love You	Woody Allen	1996	Alan Alda, Goldie Hawn, Julia Roberts	Post-film Q&A was scheduled to include Jean Doumanian (producer) and Billy Crudup

=== 2000 ===
Festival schedule

Title	Director	Year	Starring	Notes
Sidewalk Stories	Charles Lane	1989	Charles Lane, Nicole Alysia, Tom Alpern	Post-film Q&A included Lane
Grave of the Fireflies	Isao Takahata	1988	Tsutomu Tatsumi, Ayano Shiraishi, Akemi Yamaguchi	Post-film Q&A was scheduled to include Richard J. Leskosky and Greg Dean Schmitz (film critics)
American Movie	Chris Smith	1999	Mark Borchardt, Mike Schank, Tom Schimmels	Post-film Q&A included Smith, Sarah Price (producer), and Borchardt
Coven (short)	Mark Borchardt	2000	Mark Borchardt, Tom Schimmels, Miriam Frost	Post-film Q&A included Borchardt
Legacy	Tod Lending	2000	Alaissa Collins, Marquis Collins, Nickcole Collins	Post-film Q&A was scheduled to include Lending and Nickcole Collins (film subject)
The Terrorist	Santosh Sivan	1998	Ayesha Dharker, K. Krishna, Sonu Sisupal	Post-film Q&A included Dharker and Mark Burton (executive producer)
The Castle	Rob Sitch	1997	Michael Caton, Anne Tenney, Stephen Curry	Post-film Q&A included Sitch and Michael Hirsh (producer)
A Woman's Tale	Paul Cox	1991	Sheila Florance, Gosia Dobrowolska, Norman Kaye	Post-film Q&A was scheduled to include Cox
Children of Heaven	Majid Majidi	1997	Amir Farrokh Hashemian, Bahare Seddiqi	Post-film Q&A was scheduled to include Godfrey Cheshire (film critic)
The Last Laugh	F. W. Murnau	1924	Emil Jannings, Maly Delschaft, Max Hiller	Concrete Orchestra played live accompaniment. Post-film Q&A was scheduled to include Edwin Jahiel (film critic)
Un Chien Andalou	Luis Buñuel	1929	Pierre Batcheff, Simone Mareuil, Luis Buñuel, Salvador Dalí	Concrete Orchestra played live accompaniment. Post-film Q&A was scheduled to include Edwin Jahiel (film critic)
Déjà vu	Henry Jaglom	1997	Stephen Dillane, Victoria Foyt, Vanessa Redgrave	Post-film Q&A was scheduled to include Jaglom and Foyt
Dark City	Alex Proyas	1998	Rufus Sewell, Kiefer Sutherland, Jennifer Connelly	Post-film Q&A was scheduled to include Proyas (via telephone)
Oklahoma!	Fred Zinnemann	1955	Gordon MacRae, Shirley Jones, Gloria Grahame	Post-film Q&A was scheduled to include Tim Zinnemann (son of film director)

=== 1999 ===
Festival schedule

Title	Director	Year	Starring	Notes
Dance Me to My Song	Rolf de Heer	1998	Heather Rose, John Brumpton, Joey Kennedy	Post-film Q&A included Rose
Thirteen	David D. Williams	1997	Hermine Douglas, Brandon Flynn Wells, Alan Douglas	Post-film Q&A was scheduled to include Williams
Household Saints	Nancy Savoca	1993	Tracey Ullman, Vincent D'Onofrio, Lili Taylor	Post-film Q&A was scheduled to include Savoca and Richard Guay (producer and co-writer)
Battleship Potemkin	Sergei Eisenstein	1925	Aleksandr Antonov, Vladimir Barsky, Grigori Aleksandrov	Concrete Orchestra played live accompaniment
Maborosi	Hirokazu Koreeda	1995	Makiko Esumi, Takashi Naitō, Tadanobu Asano	
Surrender Dorothy	Kevin DiNovis	1998	Peter Pryor, Kevin DiNovis, Jason Centeno	Post-film Q&A was scheduled to include DiNovis
Shiloh	Dale Rosenbloom	1996	Michael Moriarty, Scott Wilson, Blake Heron	Post-film Q&A was scheduled to include Rosenbloom, Wilson, and Carl Borack (producer)
Hamsun	Jan Troell	1996	Max von Sydow, Ghita Nørby	
Autumn Tale	Éric Rohmer	1998	Béatrice Romand, Marie Rivière, Alain Libolt	
Tron	Steven Lisberger	1982	Jeff Bridges, Bruce Boxleitner, David Warner	Post-film Q&A was scheduled to include Lisberger and Warner
