= Jamil Qassas =

Palestinian peace activist

Jamil Qassas is a leader in the organization Combatants for Peace, a bi-national, grassroots nonviolence movement in Israel and Palestine.

Qassas was born in the Dheisheh refugee camp after his family was displaced from their land. He is a former Palestinian militant who said he once hated Jews, having only encountered them as IDF soldiers or settlers. His grandfather was killed in the 1948 Palestine war and his uncle in the First Lebanon War. In 1987, his 14 year-old brother was shot and killed at point-blank range by soldiers, and his mother died of a heart attack while held at a checkpoint.

During the first intifada, Qassas was an organizer with a PFLP-affiliated group and spent time in Israeli jails. His perspective shifted at the end of the first intifada when he found work in Israel and his employer, an Israeli Jew, took genuine interest in his story and listened with empathy. That experience transformed how he advocated for Palestinians, and he renounced violence after realizing that not all Israelis were enemies.

Qassas serves as a general coordinator of Combatants for Peace. When he speaks in public, whether in Arabic or Hebrew, he shares how extremists won't divide Israelis and Palestinians. When addressing Israeli audiences, he emphasizes that the fighting has brought no meaningful change for either side and emphasizes the need for dialogue; in Tel Aviv, he has spoken at rallies which have drawn more than 15,000 people.

His story is told in the documentary films Disturbing the Peace (2016) and There Is Another Way (2025). In the first film, he shares how he was affected by his mother who was deeply upset after hearing about Jews killed in a bus bombing. She told him that mothers suffer when they lose a child no matter who they are. Qassas says that his experience with Combatants for Peace has created new perspectives and allowed different narratives to be heard. He says cooperation is necessary in order to fight the occupation and bring dignity and collective liberation for both peoples.
