= Mai Shahin =

Palestinian peace activist

Mai Shahin is a Palestinian peace activist and a founder of the organization Satyam.

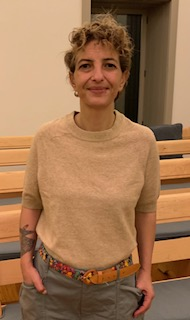
Mai Shahin at Mondays4Gaza launch in Philadelphia September 8, 2025

== Early life and education ==
Shahin grew up in Al-Eizariya near East Jerusalem during the First Intifada. On her way to school she had to pass through military posts, and she witnessed home raids and increasing separation between communities. Even when she joined peace protests during this time, she saw violent clashes in the streets, while support for armed resistance was growing. Shahin herself fought against Israel during the Second Intifada.

== Satyam ==
With training as a therapist, her perspective began to shift through work as a translator, which introduced her to Combatants for Peace, a movement founded by former fighters from both sides who chose nonviolence as their path forward. Shahin later worked with Ecome, an Israeli-Palestinian community space that promoted nonviolent communication to end the conflict. Although Ecome closed in 2018, Shahin co-founded Satyam in its spirit in the spring of 2024. The Satyam Homeland peace center offers a program and community space that brings Israelis and Palestinians together through nonviolent communication. Based in Beit Jala near Bethlehem, the center hosts trainings on trauma, grief, and women’s circles. It is also near the al-Makhrour area, a site of settler violence and land grabs. After October 7, activists said it was the only remaining Palestinian-Israeli peace center in the West Bank.

Shahin and David Ginati, a German-Israeli, began a hunger strike in mid-June 2025 as part of a Satyam initiative "Their Hunger is Ours", which campaigns against genocide and hunger in Gaza, settler violence, and for the safe return of Israeli hostages. The campaign hosts Zoom sessions and calls for participation in a global hunger strike in solidarity with Gaza.

In her speeches, Shahin frequently adapts the political phrase from the river to the sea to include both Palestinians and Israelis: “From the river to the sea, everyone shall be free.” She is featured in the 2025 documentary film There Is Another Way.
