= There Is Another Way =

2025 documentary about Combatants for Peace

- Poster
- Directed by: Stephen Apkon
- Produced by: Stephen Apkon; Marcina Hale; Keaton Cristobal
- Production company: Reconsider Films
- Release date: March 13, 2025
- Running time: 67 minutes
- Languages: Arabic, English and Hebrew, with English subtitles

There is Another Way is a 2025 documentary film that follows Combatants for Peace after the October 7 attacks and during the Gaza war.

Director Stephen Apkon, who embedded with Combatants for Peace for three years when making his first film Disturbing the Peace (2016), interweaves graphic footage of the Israeli–Palestinian conflict since October 7, 2023, with testimonies from group members, showing how they confront both internal doubts and external hostility in increasingly polarized societies. The film emphasizes that people are born into narratives, Israeli or Palestinian, and that true transformation begins when one recognizes the humanity in the other side. Members interviewed include Palestinians Sulaiman Khatib, who after serving prison time for stabbing Israeli soldiers renounced violence, and Jamil Qassas and Mai Shahin, who shared their personal stories of choosing nonviolent resistance and Israelis Iris Gur, who described the struggle to resist anger and calls for revenge after the events of October 7, 2023, and Elie Avidor who fought in the Yom Kippur War but came to realize that he could not be free if Palestinians were not also free.

Acknowledging the asymmetry of occupier and occupied, There Is Another Way argues for collective liberation: freedom and justice for Palestinians, and liberation from fear for Israelis. By situating the story in the aftermath of October 7 and Israel’s military response in Gaza, the documentary highlights the ongoing suffering on both sides while presenting nonviolence as the only viable path forward. The film also emphasizes shared grief and the rejection of revenge while underscoring the futileness of endless retaliation, and portrays survivors who channel their pain into peace activism. Interviewees like Yonatan Zeigen, son of slain activist Vivian Silver, and Combatants for Peace’s Ahmed Al-Helou say the real struggle is not Israelis versus Palestinians, but between those perpetuating violence and those seeking justice.

Colum McCann and James Cameron signed on as executive producers for the film, with Cameron noting that it moved him with its humanity and semblance of hope in a seemingly hopeless conflict. The film received the “Vision for Human Rights Award” from International Film Festival and Forum on Human Rights 2025.

== Reception ==
=== Accolades ===
Award	Date of ceremony	Category	Recipient(s)	Result	Ref.
Cinema for Peace Awards	16 February 2026	Cinema for Peace Dove for The Most Valuable Documentary of the Year	There Is Another Way	Pending	
