= Avner Wishnitzer =

Israeli peace activist and academic

- Born: 1976
- Occupation: Historian
- Scientific career
- Workplaces: Tel Aviv University (2014–)

Avner Wishnitzer (Hebrew: אבנר וישניצר) is an Israeli academic, peace activist, and cofounder of Combatants for Peace.

Wishnitzer was born and reared on Kibbutz Kvutzat Shiller in central Israel. He is a veteran of Sayeret Matkal, the most elite commando unit in the Israel Defense Forces. In the early 2000s after he had completed his military service the Second Intifada began, and he wondered if he was getting complete information from the Israeli media about it. To find out more, he volunteered with an Israeli peace group to deliver blankets to Palestinians who lived in caves because their homes had been destroyed by the Israeli army, and he began to realize that there was an anti-democratic system which was a creation of the Israeli government and therefore his responsibility. In 2003, he was one of 13 former Sayeret Matkal reservists to send a letter to then Prime Minister Ariel Sharon which said they refused to serve in the Palestinian territories.

== Combatants for Peace ==
Soon after word of the letter to Sharon became public, a group of Palestinian political activists approached the Israeli reservists to talk. It was during this meeting that the idea of an organization of people who had been combatants could come together to discuss differences without violence during an ongoing conflict. In 2005, Wishnitzer and other former Israeli soldiers formally met with former Palestinian militants and engaged in dialogue for over a year before officially founding the organization in 2006. Wishnitzer has argued for more critical self-reflection within Israeli society about Israeli rule in the occupied territories, noting that a neglected issue in Israel's public discourse is the plight of Palestinian nonviolent protestors, many of whom are repeatedly detained without trial or formal charges.

In 2021, he was detained in the South Hebron Hills when he and other members of Combatants for Peace tried to deliver a tank of water to an isolated Palestinian community near the unauthorized settler outpost of Avigayil. Israeli soldiers patrolling the area attacked the members violently, which was documented in video footage. At the time Wishnitzer said that instead of the public focusing on the treatment of the Israeli activists, they should focus on what's happening to Palestinians in the West Bank including land appropriations, checkpoints, administrative detentions, and settler violence.

Wishnitzer and fellow Combatants for Peace member Bassam Aramin received the "IIE Victor J. Goldberg Prize for Peace in the Middle East" in 2010. He is also featured in the documentary films Disturbing the Peace (2016) and There Is Another Way (2025).

== Academic career ==
Wishnitzer received his PhD in 2009 from Tel Aviv University, where he is a professor in the Department of Middle Eastern and African History. His research focuses on the social and cultural history of the late Ottoman period.

His 2015 book Reading Clocks alla Turca: Time and Society in the Late Ottoman Empire analyzes the evolving temporal systems, daily rhythms, and the meaning of time among the Ottoman elite during the long nineteenth century. The book centers on two parallel stories: the transition from a patrimonial tradition of time to a legal-rational system, and the gradual replacement of Ottoman clock-keeping methods by European timekeeping practices. He draws on a diverse range of sources, including poetry, military schedules, ferry timetables, and political cartoons to describe late Ottoman temporality. He explores how time reflected the empire's societal structures and underscores the role of state-driven reforms in the emergence of modern temporality, marking the Ottoman Empire as an unusual case where this shift was more state-imposed than driven by industrial capitalism.

In his 2021 book As Night Falls: Eighteenth-Century Ottoman Cities after Dark, he explores the Ottoman night in the eighteenth and early nineteenth centuries, showing how darkness shaped everyday life, spirituality, and politics. He reveals the night as both threatening and liberating, while a time of fear and retreat for many, also a time of illicit trade, entertainment, and rebellion. His work highlights how the state alternately tolerated and profited from illegal night-time activities while using grand illuminations to project power and piety. Reviewers of As Night Falls note that by situating these practices alongside but distinct from European traditions, Wishnitzer offers one of the first sustained accounts of how night was lived and controlled in the Ottoman world.

== Books ==
- Wishnitzer, Avner (2015). Reading Clocks alla Turca: Time and Society in the Late Ottoman Empire. University of Chicago Press. ISBN 978-0-226-25786-0.
- Wishnitzer, Avner (2021). As Night Falls: Eighteenth-Century Ottoman Cities after Dark. Cambridge University Press. ISBN 978-1-108-83214-4.
