= Chen Alon =

Israeli lecturer and activist

Chen Alon (Hebrew: חן אלון) is an Israeli lecturer, activist, and cofounder of Combatants for Peace. Alon is the Theater Director of the movement. He was nominated, along with Palestinian Combatants for Peace co-founder, Sulaiman Khatib, for the Nobel Peace Prize in 2017. Alon served for four years as an officer in the Israeli Defense Force, upon his release he served 11 years as an operations officer in the reserves. Later he became a "refusenik," and co-founded the group "Courage to Refuse," a group of former IDF officers and combat soldiers refusing to serve in the occupied territories. As a result, he served time in jail. Alon currently works as Theater Director and lecturer at Tel Aviv University.

== Childhood ==
Alon's grandfather immigrated to Palestine at the turn of the century because of his Zionist ideals. He was the only member of his family who was not killed in the Holocaust. As a result, Alon grew up with the understanding that Zionism literally saved his family from destruction. He was raised to believe that the Jewish State was surrounded by enemies whose goal, like the Nazis, was to massacre the Jewish people and destroy the State. He was taught that men like his father, who served in both the 1967 war and the 1973 war, were heroes for defending the people and the land. In spite of this, his father came back from the wars deeply psychologically damaged and permanently traumatized; as a result, Alon was exposed to the effects of war at a young age.

== Military service ==
Drafted in 1987, Alon calls himself an "Occupation Scholar" for his participation in IDF activities in the West Bank and Gaza. He said he was "sent everywhere and did everything. The most difficult thing were the arrests." Alon talks about having to arrest children as young as ten years old for being "wanted terrorists". In 2001, he was again drafted into military service during the second Intifada. He describes a particular moment that transformation took place for him:

The Palestinian villages became like prisons, with one exit in and out. On one occasion when I was stationed at a roadblock, I was asked to allow a taxi full of sick Palestinian children (who didn’t have a permit) through to the hospital in Bethlehem. At the same time, I got a phone call from my wife telling me she was having problems picking up our three-year-old daughter from kindergarten. So there I was, standing on a sand blockade talking to my wife, while sick Palestinian children were waiting in the car. I couldn’t bear it any more: on the one hand I was a kind, devoted father, and on the other hand I was being so callous with these people. Were these children nothing more than potential terrorists? My children were human, and yet we had dehumanized the Palestinian children entirely. I began to realize that in the de-humanizing of the other, you begin to de-humanize yourself. That night we got the order to demolish a Palestinian house. I presumed it must belong to a terrorist, but I found out later we were demolishing it because the owner had built an “illegal” balcony. Hence a civil legal mission became a military operation. We came with two platoons, a bulldozer and three tanks. Not surprisingly the operation deteriorated into a fierce battle, with the local Mosque calling people in to defend the house and to rise up against the Israeli invasion. I knew from then on that this was the last time I could do such a thing.

At this point he signed a petition of IDF soldiers and officers refusing to serve in the Occupied Palestinian Territories.

=== Courage to Refuse ===
The Courage to Refuse letter was an open letter initiated by soldiers and officers stating that they would no longer serve in the occupied territories of the West Bank and Gaza. As of February 2003, Alon was one of 520 Israeli reservists who had put their names to this petition. At that time he described his position: "We are all front-line combat soldiers, Zionist patriots and willing to defend their country and fight against any real aggression against the state of Israel, but we are not willing to humiliate and starve and expel and repress three million people." Alon said that he had realized, after some incidents during his military service in Bethlehem at the beginning of the second intifada, "that our presence was only to get a few more people killed or wounded, to keep the war going on. The occupation for me is many, many horrible details, of curfews and sieges and children who can't go to school - all these things that make the big picture in the occupied territories 24 hours a day."

== Combatants for Peace ==
In 2005, he and other IDF "refuseniks" were approached by a group of Palestinian former fighters. Together they formed the group, Combatants for Peace, a joint, grassroots nonviolence movement, dedicated to ending the Occupation and bringing peace and security to both Israelis and Palestinians. The movement has grown and today has hundreds of members and thousands of supporters. The Combatants speak to nearly 3,000 people per year, hold a joint annual Memorial Day ceremony, which attracts over 4,000 people and is live-screened across the world, run tours in the West Bank, and hold dialogue and reconciliation groups. They also have a theater group, which Alon directs, that uses theater to build bonds and overcome trauma.

The documentary film Disturbing the Peace depicts the founding of Combatants for Peace, and profiles several of its founding members including Alon. This film, directed by Stephen Apkon and Andrew Young, was awarded the first ever Roger Ebert Humanitarian Award in 2016, a recognition for films that exemplify humanity and empathy.

=== Theatrical work ===
Alon began to study theatre at an acting school after his army service, and was subsequently professionally involved in repertory theatre. An important theatrical influence was the playwright Hanoch Levin. He studied theatre at Tel Aviv University after his release from jail, and heard about Augusto Boal and the Theatre of the Oppressed in his first year there.

=== Theatre of the Oppressed ===
Alon works with the techniques of the Theatre of the Oppressed of Augusto Boal and co-developed the Polarized model of the Theatre of the Oppressed. He has introduced his model into Combatants for Peace, which often use theater as a means of nonviolent protest and reconciliation work. This theater often takes place at road blocks within the West Bank, in villages and in public spaces; it allows audiences to view the aggression and violence of the military occupation and struggle in a nonviolent way. For example, the Theatre of the Oppressed has acted out the common scene of a sick Palestinian grandfather trying to get back to his home in the village who is stopped by Israeli soldiers, and has performed the scene of a home demolition. Alon has described how the actors confront the guards in this kind of situation by "mirroring how they look" in order to "shoot embarrassment on them". Theatre of the Oppressed techniques allows actors from both sides of the conflict to view and understand the pain of the other. Augusto Boal has described the objective of Theatre of the Oppressed as "to encourage autonomous activity ... to set a process in motion, to stimulate transformative creativity, to change spectators into protagonists". Alon has taught Theatre of the Oppressed techniques in many countries throughout the world.

About the Theatre of the Oppressed, Alon has said, "I think it’s a form of knowledge, which is able to avoid, bypass or subvert obstacles such as the resistance to new ideas, the resistance to feeling for the other or identifying with the other. They are all things that prevent us from being transformed. The Theatre allows us to take an action and to observe ourselves at the same time, to put ourselves in the shoes of the other or to embody another person: I truly believe that these qualities of the Theatre are transformative."

=== Legislative Theatre at Holot and other theatrical work ===
Alon has also worked together with Avi Mograbi to found the Legislative Theatre at the Holot detention center, a troupe composed of six asylum seekers who have been detained there, along with four Israelis. Their first play was performed in 2015, and a film was made documenting the theatrical process. The play consists of images explaining the reasons the asylum seekers left their homelands, and moves between situations familiar to every asylum seeker in Israel: crossing the border; sleeping on the grass in south Tel Aviv's Levinsky Park; exploitative working conditions; the inability to establish a family and build a stable life; to their imprisonment in Holot. Alon has also worked with groups of prisoners inside jails and addicts on detox programs. Alon considers expansion of one's acting ability to be politically empowering and has said that "to learn to expand your ability for expression is a political act".
