= Jacob Burns Film Center =

Independent movie theater in Pleasantville, New York

Coordinates: 41.13507°N 73.79165°W

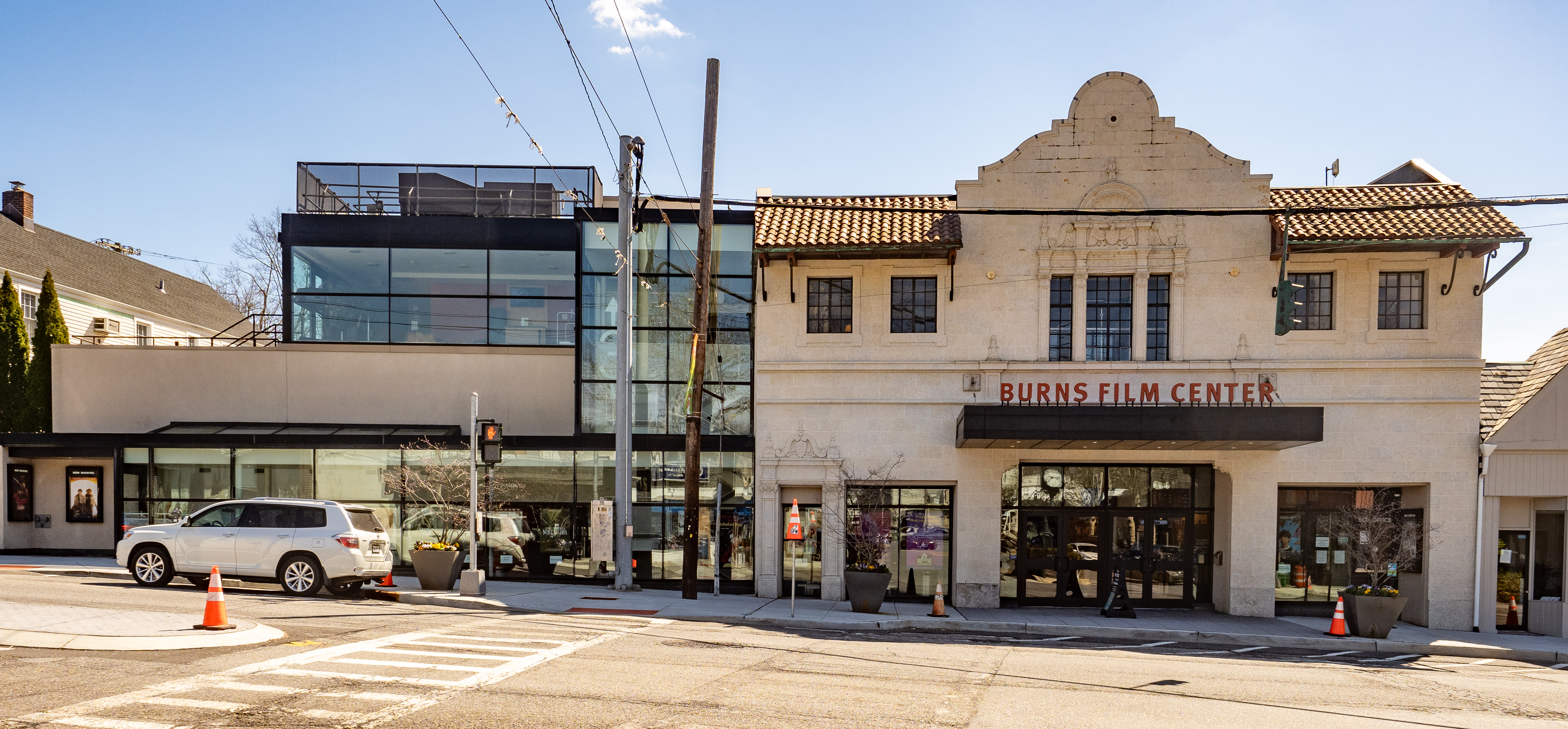
Main facade of the Jacob Burns Film Center

Jacob Burns Film Center logo

The Jacob Burns Film Center (JBFC) is a nonprofit cultural arts center located in Pleasantville, New York. It occupies the old Rome Theater, a Spanish mission-style theater built in 1925.

Along with independent and documentary films, the center hosts a variety of special events, including discussions with filmmakers, critics and people from the industry following some screenings. The New York Times has credited the theater with helping to revitalize the downtown area of Pleasantville. It annually hosts Pace University's documentary premiere with a documentary created by their class.

== History ==
The Rome Theater, named after its owner Granville Rome, was originally built in 1925 and was the first movie theater in Westchester County. The theater matched the movie palace designs that were popular at the time, including leather seats, friezes, velvet curtains and an original Photolayer pipe organ. The Rome Theater continued screening movies until it closed in 1987 and became an office building.

In 1998 Stephen Apkon and the non-profit Friends of the Rome Theater purchased the 11,000-square-foot (1,000 m^{2}) Rome Theater and a 6,000-square-foot (560 m^{2}) land parcel next door for $1 million. Over the next 3 years, another $4 million was spent for design and construction. The center opened its doors in June 2001 and covered 18,500 square feet (1,720 m^{2}) including three theaters containing 249 seats, 135 and 72 seats. The theater was named in honor of Jacob Burns, a lawyer and businessman whose family foundation gave $1.5 million towards the renovation efforts.

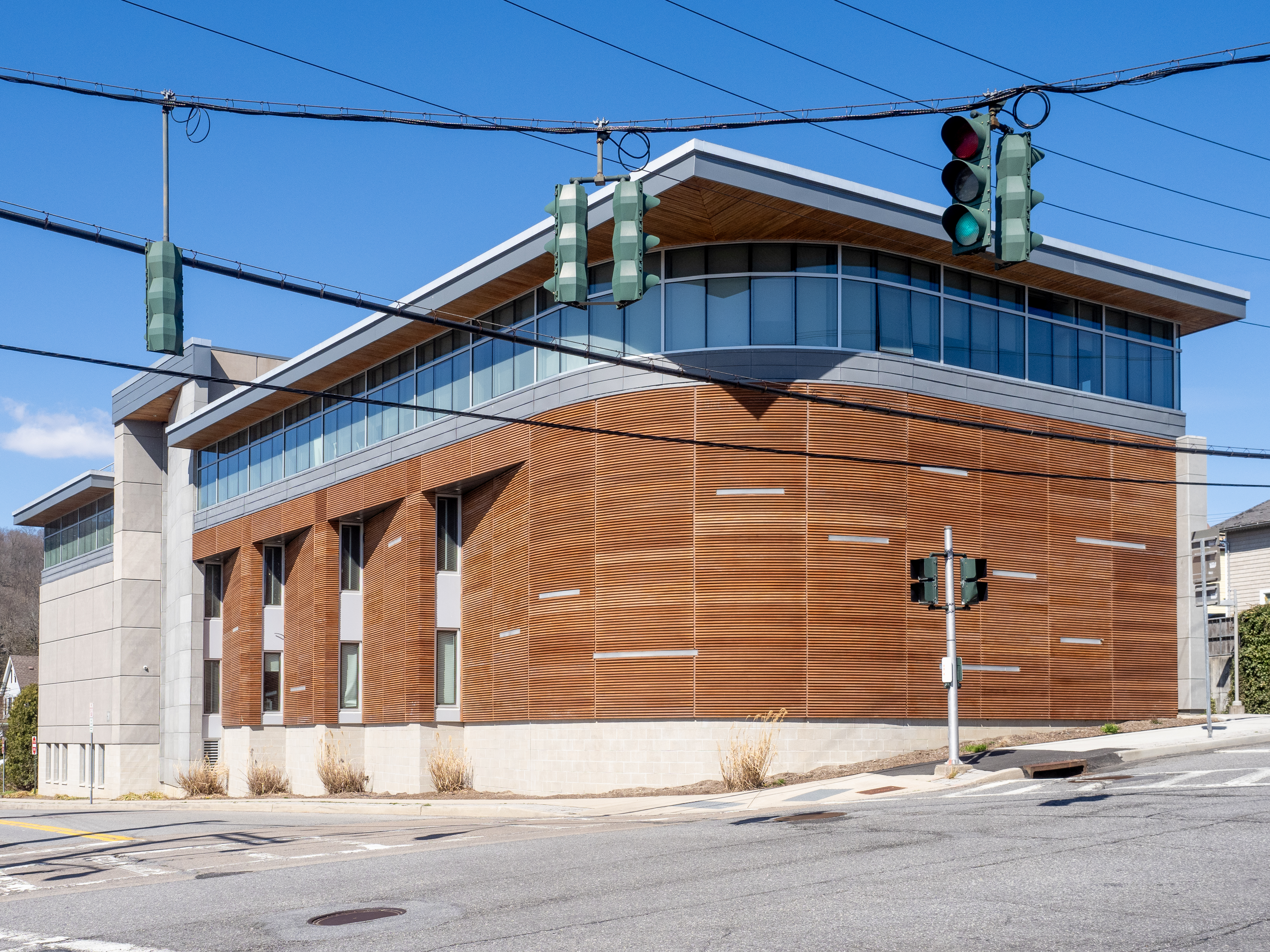
Media Arts Lab

In 2008, the JBFC opened a $15 million Media Arts Lab and started new programs targeting digital literacy in the surrounding area. The Media Arts Lab was part of the JBFC's larger digital literacy education efforts that included sending some staff to prisons in Venezuela to teach prisoners and teachers there about digital literacy. Helmed by Sean Weiner, the Media Arts Lab started the Creative Culture fellowship in 2016 that became a launching pad for up-and coming filmmakers.

== Films ==
The Jacob Burns Film Center shows independent and documentary films. It shows a combination of independent and mainstream films. They sometimes have special guests in attendance. For example, they had a showing of A Series of Unfortunate Events with author Daniel Handler and actress Meryl Streep in attendance.
