= Rita Coburn =

American director, producer, writer, and radio personality

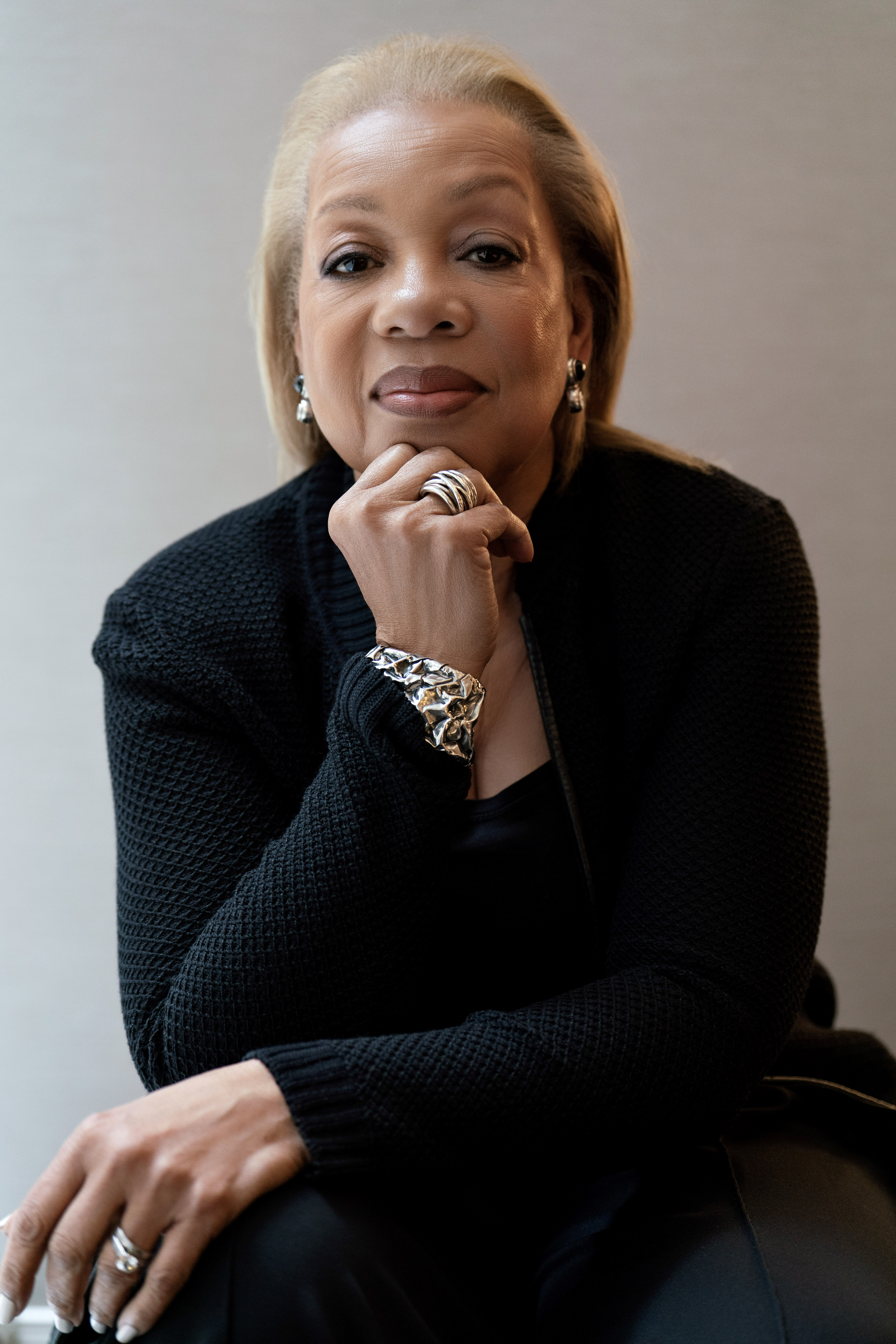
- Born: June 13, 1958 (age 68); Harvey, Illinois, U.S.
- Occupations: Director, writer, producer
- Years active: 1980–present

Rita Coburn is an American director, producer, writer, and radio personality. She has worked in television, film, and radio, with a focus on projects related to African-American history and culture. Coburn is the CEO and owner of RCW Media Productions, Inc., a multimedia production company established in 2010.

== Early life and education ==
Coburn was born in Harvey, Illinois, to Willie E. and Charlie G. Coburn. She grew up in Phoenix, Illinois, with her sister, Joyce. Coburn attended Calvin Coolidge Elementary School and Eisenhower Elementary, then graduated from Northwestern University in 1980 with a Bachelor of Arts degree.

== Career ==
Coburn started her career in broadcasting, working as a producer and writer for news outlets in the United States. She produced content for television stations such as WBBM, WTTW, and WYCC in Chicago, as well as for The Oprah Winfrey Show, Oprah Radio, and Walt Disney Productions.

Coburn began her career in broadcasting in 1980 as a production assistant at WBBM-TV in Chicago. She held production roles at the Satellite News Channel (1981), WNEW-TV (1982), KDKA-TV (1984–1990), WPXI-TV (until 1991), and The Jenny Jones Show (until 1993).

Coburn directed the documentary African Roots, African Soil: African Americans in Agriculture in the mid-1990s, which aired on WBBM-TV. In 1998, she joined WBEZ in Chicago as a producer and host for programs including Eight Forty-Eight. From 2006, she worked as a producer for Oprah Radio at Harpo Productions and was a contributor to WBEZ. Her documentary work includes Remembering 47th Street (2000), about Chicago's Bronzeville community, and Curators of Culture (2005).

In 2016, Coburn co-directed and co-produced Maya Angelou: And Still I Rise with Bob Hercules, which premiered at the Sundance Film Festival and aired on PBS's American Masters in 2017. She directed Marian Anderson: The Whole World in Her Hands (2022) for American Masters. She produced San Juan Hill: Manhattan's Lost Neighborhood (2024).

Coburn directed, wrote, and produced W.E.B. Du Bois: Rebel With a Cause (2026), a documentary for PBS's American Masters series. It is scheduled to premiere at the Directors Guild of America (DGA) in Los Angeles March 2026, Cleveland International Film Festival in April 2026 and nationally on PBS on May 19, 2026. In 2026, she launched the podcast Our Truth Our History Our Story: Our THS.

== Personal life ==
Coburn married Harold Whack in 1983 and they have two children, Harold Lee Whack and Christine Coburn Whack. Divorced in 2017, she married Andrew T. Carr in 2022.

== Selected filmography ==
Year	Title	Contribution	Note
2000	Remembering 47th Street	Writer and producer	Documentary
2005	Curators of Culture	Producer	Documentary
2016	Maya Angelou: And Still I Rise	Co-director and producer	Documentary
2022	Marian Anderson: The Whole World in Her Hands	Director and producer	Documentary
2024	San Juan Hill: Manhattan's Lost Neighborhood	Producer	Documentary
2026	W.E.B. Du Bois: Rebel With a Cause	Director, writer and producer	Documentary

== Publications ==
- 2002 – Meant to Be

== Awards ==
- Chicago / Midwest Emmy Award (1995–1996) for African Roots, African Soil: African Americans in Agriculture
- Chicago / Midwest Emmy Award (2000–2001) for Remembering 47th Street
- Chicago / Midwest Emmy Award (2005) for Curators of Culture
- Mill Valley Film Festival Audience Award (2016) for Maya Angelou: And Still I Rise
- Milwaukee Film Festival Audience Award (2016) for Maya Angelou: And Still I Rise
- AFI Docs Audience Award (2016) for Maya Angelou: And Still I Rise
- Peabody Award (2017) for Maya Angelou: And Still I Rise
- Ebertfest Icon Award (2019) for Maya Angelou: And Still I Rise
- Illinois Arts Council Artist Fellowship Award (2023) in Media Arts
