= Oprah Radio =

2006-2014 talk radio channel

- Broadcast area: United States; Canada
- Frequencies: XM111; SR204
- Branding: Oprah Radio

Programming
- Format: Talk radio

Ownership
- Owner: Harpo Radio, Inc.

History
- First air date: September 25, 2006

Technical information
- Class: Satellite Radio Station

Oprah Radio was a talk radio channel programmed by Harpo Productions' radio division, and was signed exclusively for Sirius XM Satellite Radio. The channel left satellite radio on December 31, 2014.

Oprah Radio included regular programming on topics such as current events, self-improvement, health, nutrition, fitness, and home. Friends and contributors included: Gayle King, Dr. Mehmet Oz, Marianne Williamson, Bob Greene, Jean Chatzky and Nate Berkus. On July 17, 2006, a preview loop of the channel began to air. The channel officially launched on September 25, 2006. In January 2008 it added Rabbi Shmuley Boteach to host a national daily radio show named The Rabbi Shmuley Show. The channel ceased operations January 1, 2015.

== History ==
It was announced in June 2006 that former Clear Channel Communications regional VP John Gehron would act as general manager for Harpo Radio, Inc. On July 20, Laurie Cantillo was appointed program director of Harpo Radio. Cantillo had program director experience at stations including KFYI, KTAR, and KGME. A week later, more staff was hired for the channel, including Corny Koehl (director of development), John St. Augustine, Katherine Kelly, Scott Miller, Mark Ruffin and Rita Coburn Whack (producers).

Former XM 156 / SR 195 Logo as Oprah and Friends

In September 2007, Oprah and Friends was added to the DirecTV lineup on channel 807. Following the Sirius/XM merger, Oprah & Friends was added to Sirius on September 30, 2008, as part of its "Best of XM" package, and broadcast on channel 195 (it moved to channel 204 on May 4, 2011). On November 12, 2008, Oprah and Friends was removed from the DirecTV lineup.

In November 2008, John Gehron and Laurie Cantillo exited their positions at Oprah & Friends. Corny Koehl was named Executive Producer of the channel in charge of the creative side, and Katherine Kelly was named Operations Manager handling the day-to-day workings of the channel.

On March 4, 2009, Oprah and Friends was renamed and rebranded as Oprah Radio. Listeners tuned in on January 1, 2015, to an announcement explaining that the channel had ceased broadcasts on SiriusXM.
