= Aidan Gould =

American actor

- Born: February 26, 1997 (age 29); Columbus, Georgia, U.S.
- Occupations: Film and television actor
- Years active: 2001–2013
- Relatives: Nolan Gould (brother)

Aidan Gould (born February 26, 1997) is an American actor. He is the older brother of Modern Family star Nolan Gould.

== Family and education ==
Gould was born in Columbus, Georgia. The family moved to Phenix City, Alabama, when he was very young because his father, an army captain, was stationed at Fort Benning. The family moved to California in 2003.

== Career ==
Like his brother Nolan, Aidan was a child actor. His career began in 2001; at age four, he was considered for We Were Soldiers, but instead made his first appearance in a television commercial.

In 2008, he starred in the movie Julia opposite Tilda Swinton. The movie was entered in the 2008 Berlinale; one German critic called Gould's performance "impressive", and another said Gould's performance was "uncannily capable". Matthew Turner of View London called Aidan's performance a "remarkable job", and Amber Wilkinson of Eye for Film remarked, "Gould invests Tom with sufficient reticence."

== Filmography ==
=== Film ===
Year	Title	Role	Note
2006	The Red Balloon	Jimmy	Short film
2006	The Secret Life of Leonardo Da Vinci	Leo as a boy	
2006	The McPassion	Whip and Hammer Boy	
2006	National Health Test with Bryant Gumbel	Christmas Kid	Uncredited
2007	Christmas Spirit	Danny	Short film
2007	A New Tomorrow	Joseph	
2007	The Revengers	Child Tadzio	
2008	The Rainbow Tribe	Josh	
2008	Julia	Tom	
2013	Dynamite Swine	Young Evan	

=== Television ===
Year	Title	Role	Note
2005	Friday Night Slimetime "Halloween Special"		
2005	The Late Late Show with Craig Ferguson	Telethon Kid	
2007	Gilmore Girls	Kid Sinclair	Episode; "Hay Bale Maze"
2007	Passions	Good Witch Student #1	
2010	CSI: Crime Scene Investigation	Will Sutter	Episode; "Neverland"
2012	iCarly	Lars	Episode; "iGet Banned"
2013	Workaholics	Chargonius	Episode; "High Art"
2013	Modern Family	Drummer	Episode; "Best Men"
