= Stephen Apkon =

American author and filmmaker

Stephen Apkon is founder of the Jacob Burns Film Center, author of the book The Age of the Image, and has directed two films, Disturbing the Peace (2016) and There Is Another Way (2025), which focus on members of Combatants for Peace.

== Early life and career ==
Apkon is a native of Framingham, Massachusetts. He has an MBA from the Harvard Business School and worked as an investment banker at Goldman Sachs. He left Wall Street to pursue his passion for film. In 1993, he and his family relocated from Manhattan to Pleasantville, New York, and he noticed that there was a desire for a diverse film experience in Westchester instead of having to travel into New York City.

== Jacob Burns Film Center ==
He founded the Jacob Burns Film Center in 2000, not only to bring a venue for film viewing and discussion to Westchester but also to create a family-oriented, community-based space, that emphasized educational programming and visual literacy education. Seeing a disconnect between his children's classroom and the world they were growing up in, he became drawn to digital literacy. He led the organization from 2001 to 2013.

== The Age of the Image ==
In 2013, Apkon published The Age of the Image: Redefining Literacy in a World of Screens. The book traces the evolution of visual literacy from cave paintings to YouTube, offering both a personal perspective and a foundation suitable as a textbook for an introductory college course. He explores the idea that images and film are the most powerful and engaging forms of text people have developed. The book covers brain science related to vision, the persuasive use of imagery in advertising, and the narrative potential of visuals, drawing a parallel between the grammar of film and the grammar of written language.

A core message of the book is the need for visual literacy in education. This literacy is rooted in decoding non-verbal messages. Apkon notes that as the culture becomes more global, communication continues to rely on words, but increasingly those words are paired with powerful visuals, and it's the images that linger in our memory. He points out that images have long shaped public perception, often more than facts, citing the 1960 Kennedy-Nixon debates, where Nixon's disheveled appearance overshadowed his performance, while Kennedy tapped into a deeper, emotional response in viewers. The book also highlights the educational programs at the Jacob Burns Film Center, which teach teenagers to interpret and create visual stories. Apkon argues that one's understanding of literacy must evolve to match how people now learn and communicate—through screens and images as much as or more than traditional books.

== Films ==
In 2013, Apkon resigned as executive director of the Jacob Burns Film Center to lead a new media production company, Reconsider, of which he is executive director.

He began working on a documentary about Israeli soldiers and Palestinian militants who came together to pursue nonviolent solutions to the Israeli-Palestinian conflict, who were part of an organization called Combatants for Peace. Apkon first visited Israel in 1976 as a 12-year-old. Over the years, his interest with the country's complex challenges deepened, ultimately shaping his path as a documentary filmmaker. Drawn to the mission of Combatants for Peace, Apkon partnered with co-director Andrew Young to document their story. Over nearly three years, they interviewed former Israeli soldiers from elite military units and Palestinian ex-combatants who had spent years in prison. The resulting film was Disturbing the Peace which premiered in 2016. The documentary was a New York Times critic's pick, and received the Ebert Humanitarian Award, the Brizzolara Family Foundation Award for a Film of Conflict and Resolution at the Hamptons International Film Festival, and won both the Audience Award and the Founders Award for Best Foreign Documentary at the Traverse City Film Festival.

In 2025, Apkon directed There Is Another Way which also follows Combatants for Peace, examining their struggles after the violence of October 7, 2023 and the war in Gaza. The film highlights grief, rage, and ongoing joint activism of CfP members. He was particularly moved by young people in the Freedom School, founded by CfP, a program teaching nonviolence and political awareness to Israelis and Palestinians. Apkon said filming in the West Bank was difficult witnessing settler violence and IDF activity, but meaningful seeing Israelis standing in solidarity with Palestinians. Stressing the need for honest dialogue, protest, and storytelling, he sees his films as starting points for crucial conversations—tools to help re-humanize those on both sides and to amplify voices working toward peace, even in the face of entrenched violence and extremism. The film won Vision for Human Rights Award at FIFDH 2025.

He is also an executive producer for the documentary films Planetary (2015) which premiered at SXSW and Fantastic Fungi (2019).
