= Disturbing the Peace (2016 film) =

2016 documentary about Combatants for Peace

- Poster
- Directed by: Stephen Apkon; Andrew Young
- Produced by: Stephen Apkon; Marcina Hale
- Cinematography: Avner Shahaf
- Production company: Reconsider Films
- Distributed by: Abramorama
- Release date: April 15, 2016 (Ebertfest)
- Running time: 87 minutes
- Languages: Arabic, English and Hebrew, with English subtitles
- Box office: $25,287

Disturbing the Peace is a 2016 documentary film about the work of Combatants for Peace directed by Stephen Apkon and Andrew Young.

== Synopsis ==
The film introduces members of Combatants for Peace, an activist group of former Israeli soldiers and Palestinian fighters who have renounced violence against the enemy after years of participating in it and instead advocate for a two-state solution. It first gives a brief history of the Israeli–Palestinian conflict since Israel's founding in 1948. Through interviews, historical footage, and reenactments, the viewer learns of each side's personal traumas and how members came to see the humanity in the other. Combatants, including former Israeli soldiers Chen Alon and Avner Wishnitzer and former Palestinian fighters Sulaiman Khatib and Jamil Qassas, share their family histories and personal experiences linked to the Israeli–Palestinian conflict. Another subject, Shifa al-Qudsi, recalled the grief she felt over the destruction of her home in Tulkarm, which ultimately led her to attempt a suicide bombing in Netanya as an act of vengeance for Palestinians killed by the Israel Defense Forces.

Rather than deeply analyzing overarching political hostilities such as Hamas’s attacks on Israel or Israeli settlement expansion, the film briefly presents wrenching images—such as a bombing in Tel Aviv and demolished Palestinian homes before focusing on the personal journeys of Combatants for Peace members. Their transformations unfold not as sudden revelations but as gradual, profound realizations. The film creates a balance between the different narratives, and the film's website provides a discussion guide for having conversations about the film. Director Apkon noted that each side had to break out of the cycle of victim and perpetrator in order for peace to work.

Premiering April 15, 2016 at Ebertfest, the film was shown on the separation wall in the West Bank in July 2016, and opened in the United States November 11, 2016.

== Awards and recognition ==
- Ebert Humanitarian Award (2016)
- Hamptons International Film Festival: Brizzolara Family Foundation Award for a Film of Conflict and Resolution (2016)
- New York Times Critic's Pick
- Traverse City Film Festival: Won both the Audience Award and the Founders Award for Best Foreign Documentary (2016)
