= Julia (2008 film) =

- Film poster
- Directed by: Erick Zonca
- Written by: Michael Collins; Camille Natta (adaptation); Erick Zonca (writer); Aude Py (co-writer)
- Produced by: Bertrand Faivre; François Marquis
- Starring: Tilda Swinton; Aidan Gould; Saul Rubinek; Kate del Castillo
- Cinematography: Yorick Le Saux
- Edited by: Philippe Kotlarski
- Music by: Pollard Berrier; Darius Keeler
- Distributed by: StudioCanal (France); Magnolia Pictures (US)
- Release date: March 12, 2008
- Running time: 144 minutes
- Countries: France; United States; Mexico; Belgium
- Languages: English; Spanish
- Budget: $6 million
- Box office: $1,327,897

Julia is a 2008 international co-produced crime drama film directed by Erick Zonca and starring Tilda Swinton. It was shot in California and Mexico. The film was inspired by John Cassavetes's film Gloria. Swinton was nominated for the César Award for Best Actress.

== Plot ==
In California, an alcoholic named Julia is out of control, partying every night and waking up in unknown homes with no memory of the previous night. Her reckless behavior costs her her job, and she begins to go broke. She soon meets Elena at an AA meeting. One night, Elena takes Julia into her apartment after finding her passed out on the pavement.

The next day, Elena explains that she wants to kidnap her son Tom from his wealthy grandfather and asks Julia to participate for $50,000. Julia declines, but after some time, changes her mind. She visits an old friend to ask for his cooperation, but her offer is refused. She rides to the Mexican border, kidnaps the little boy and blackmails Elena's father-in-law for $2 million.

The police discover her whereabouts and she flees, accidentally crashing her car through a wall dividing the United States and Mexico. There, the boy is kidnapped by Mexican kidnappers. Her friend Mitch arrives in Mexico and gives Julia the ransom money. During the exchange, the Mexican kidnappers steal the money, leaving the boy safely with Julia.

== Cast ==
- Tilda Swinton as Julia
- Aidan Gould as Tom
- Saul Rubinek as Mitch
- Kate del Castillo as Elena
- Jude Ciccolella as Nick
- Bruno Bichir as Diego
- Kevin Kilner as Johnny
- Ezra Buzzington as George
- Eugene Byrd as Leon
- Horacio Garcia Rojas as Santos
- John Bellucci as Phillip
- Roger Cudney as Frank
- Neko Parham as Ejay

== Production ==
Principal photography began on October 6, 2006.

== Reception ==
The film premiered in February 2008 at the Berlin Film Festival and received very positive reviews in Germany, as well as in other European countries. David Gordon Smith, writing for Der Spiegel, called it "one of the most stylish movies" in the competition, and referred to Tilda Swinton as an "unforgettable leading lady".

On the review aggregator website Rotten Tomatoes, 72% of 57 critics' reviews are positive. The website's consensus reads: "Tilda Swinton delivers a powerful performance in Julia, a tense thriller and a dark character study." Metacritic, which uses a weighted average, assigned the film a score of 62 out of 100, based on 14 critics, indicating "generally favorable" reviews.

Markus Zinsmaier, in Die Zeit, said that the film was one of the highpoints of the festival and had high praise for Swinton. Immediately after its success in Berlin, the movie was widely distributed in Germany.

The film was also praised in the French press and was called a "French film with English dialogue". L'Humanité felt that the film should have won the competition, and that Swinton should have won for best actress.

The Dutch press also praised the film. Kevin Toma of De Volkskrant called the movie "uncompromising", and of "recalcitrant, dizzying beauty".

Another Dutch reviewer, Constant Hoogenbosch of Moviemachine, was less positive, stating that the film was too long, but in the end, was saved by Swinton's performance.

A few U.S. reviewers disagreed with the generally positive European reviews. For example, Eddie Cockerell of Variety felt that the scenes with Aidan Gould tied up and at gunpoint were "uncomfortably exploitative", and that Julia's redemption at the end of the film was "more convenient than emotionally earned", feeling that the film would not do well when brought to the United States.

However, in sharp contrast, Roger Ebert of the Chicago Sun-Times placed Julia on his "The Best Films of 2009" list and stated that it is "the most striking performance in Tilda Swinton's exciting career. Only poor marketing prevented this from succeeding as the thriller of the year."

In 2013, Roy Abramsohn attended the Cinemacy interview, and chose Julia and Bernie as his favorite films.

== Release ==
The film premiered at the Berlin International Film Festival on February 9, 2008, and was released worldwide on March 12, 2008, in France; on May 7, 2008, in Belgium; on June 19, 2008, in Germany; on August 10, 2008, in India; on August 14, 2008, in the Netherlands; and on August 21, 2008, in Kuwait. The film had a limited theatrical release in the United States on April 24, 2009, and was released on DVD on August 18, 2009.
