= Combatants for Peace =

Israeli-Palestinian peace organization

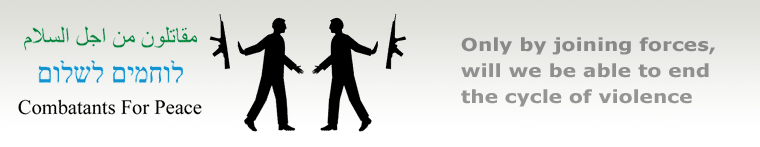
- Formation: 2006; 20 years ago
- Founder: Chen Alon, Sulaiman Khatib
- Legal status: Active
- Website: cfpeace.org

Combatants for Peace (Hebrew: לוחמים לשלום, romanized: Lochamim LeShalom; Arabic: مقاتلون من أجل آلسلام, romanized: Muqatilunmin 'Ajl Alsalam) is an Israeli–Palestinian NGO and an egalitarian, bi-national, grassroots movement committed to non-violent action against the "Israeli occupation and all forms of violence" in Israel and the Palestinian territories.

In 2005, twelve Israeli soldiers who had refused to serve in the occupied territories met with four former Palestinian fighters, most of them from the Fatah movement. During the meeting, both sides expressed a shared commitment to take responsibility for the Israeli–Palestinian conflict and to break the cycle of violence through dialogue and mutual understanding. These men and other former combatants continued to gather for a year in various towns around Jerusalem after leaders from both sides decided to take action to promote peace. After a series of such encounters, the group formally founded Combatants for Peace during Passover in 2006. Originally, the activists were solely ex-combatants: the Israeli soldiers and refuseniks of the Israeli army and Palestinian fighters. Today, members of the movement include also men and women who have never played a violent role in the conflict. Combatants for Peace is the only peace group worldwide that was founded and run by ex-combatants on both sides of an active conflict. Other joint veteran-based peace initiatives have been co-founded only after peaceful resolution to their conflict has been achieved.

The documentary film Disturbing the Peace was released in 2016 about the work of Combatants for Peace. The movie by Stephen Apkon and Andrew Young was screened throughout Israel, Palestine, the United States and Europe, was a New York Times Critic's Pick, and has won awards internationally including the first ever Ebert Humanitarian Award. In 2025, Apkon directed There Is Another Way which follows Combatants for Peace, examining their struggles, particularly after the violence of October 7, 2023, and the war in Gaza. It challenges viewers to engage in a crucial, humane conversation—one that recognizes shared humanity and seeks a compassionate, pragmatic path toward peace, dignity, and self-respect.

== Mission and goals ==
The mission of Combatants for Peace (CfP) is to create the social infrastructure needed to end the Israeli–Palestinian conflict and occupation through non-violent cooperation between Palestinians and Israelis. CfP aims to serve as a role model, showing that a peaceful alternative to violence is possible and promoting societal and political change. It envisions a strong bi-national community exemplifying cooperation and coexistence. Its goals are to end the occupation, establish a just peace, and demonstrate the possibility of Israelis and Palestinians living and working together.

== Activities ==
Combatants for Peace has organized a series of meetings between veterans from both sides, most taking place in East Jerusalem in the early years, but have expanded now into ten local bi-national groups operating between Tulkarm–Tel Aviv, Nablus–Tel Aviv, Ramallah–Tel Aviv, Jerusalem–Jericho, Jerusalem–Bethlehem, Beersheva–Hebron and in the North. Additionally, Combatants for Peace now organizes two region-wide Israeli-Palestinian bi-national groups, a Theater of the Oppressed group and women's group.

Other activities include participating in humanitarian aid work including laying water pipelines, planting gardens and playgrounds in villages, renovating schools and protecting workers' rights, delivering community lectures and workshops, direct actions and protests against the policy of occupation and its outcomes such as road blockings, house demolitions, limitations on Palestinian farmers and confiscation of land by Israeli settlers, providing information and raising public awareness globally through media and international lecture tours, and empowering marginalized Palestinian communities in the areas of agriculture, protection of human rights, preventing demolition of houses, community development and all forms of non-violent struggle.

== Joint Israeli–Palestinian ceremonies ==
=== The Joint Memorial Day Ceremony ===
The Joint Memorial Day Ceremony is organized by Combatants for Peace and The Parents Circle-Families Forum and has been held annually since 2006. In 2023 it drew over 15,000 attendees in person and around 200,000 virtual participants worldwide. Held annually on Yom HaZikaron (Israeli Memorial Day), this ceremony differs significantly from typical events that portray war and death as inevitable as it offers an opportunity for Israelis and Palestinians to mourn together and unite in their call to end the bloodshed. By grieving together, the event aims to transform despair into hope and foster compassion, emphasizing that occupation, oppression, and conflict are not unavoidable.

The participation of one of Israel's most famous veteran actresses Rivka Michaeli in the 2022 ceremony resulted in threats from right-wing extremists online, a much stronger reaction compared to when other prominent Israeli artists, authors and musicians appeared at previous years' ceremonies. In 2024 the ceremony was prerecorded to avoid the possibility of disruption by protesters.

=== The Joint Nakba Remembrance Ceremony ===
The Joint Nakba Remembrance Ceremony, organized by Combatants for Peace since 2020, aims to acknowledge and honor the Palestinian experience and history as essential steps toward peace and reconciliation. By recognizing historical truths, sharing and listening to personal stories, and fostering compassion, the ceremony seeks to break the cycle of oppression and violence. It emphasizes that current realities of bereavement and dispossession are the result of human choices and that different choices can lead to a better future. This event, a counterpart to the Israeli-Palestinian Joint Memorial Ceremony, involves collaborative efforts from Palestinians, Israelis, and internationals.

== Media ==
Combatants for Peace have been interviewed on CNN, by Democracy Now!, had a front-page article in the New York Times, had several articles featured on the BBC, and were featured in the Huffington Post, the LA Times, Al Jeezera, and the front page of the Jerusalem Post.

== Awards ==
Combatants for Peace has won a series of awards for their nonviolent, joint activism including:

- War Abolisher Award 2024 by War beyond War
- 2017/2018 nominee for the Nobel Peace Prize, specifically nominated were two of the co-founders Sulaiman Khatib and Chen Alon
- The Cinema For Peace Award in 2017
- The first ever Roger Ebert Humanitarian Award, 2016
- FOR International Pfeffer Peace Award, 2015
- Peace Direct: Tomorrow's Peacebuilders Award, 2015
- Tufts Institute for Global Leadership's Dr. Jean Mayer Global Citizenship Award, 2015
- The IIE Victor J. Goldberg Prize for Peace in the Middle East, awarded to Bassam Aramin and Avner Wishnitzer, co-founders of Combatants for Peace, 2010
- Courage of Conscience Award from the Peace Abbey, 2009
- The Anna Lindh Euro-Med Award for the Dialogue between Cultures, 2009
- The Livia Foundation Conflict Resolution Award, 2009
- The Search for Common Ground Award, 2007
- City Council of Philadelphia resolution honoring Combatants for Peace co-founders, Sulaiman Khatib and Yonatan Shapira on behalf of Combatants for Peace, 2006
- The Ben Gurion University Berlson Award.
- The Friedrich Siegmund-Schultze award for non-violence.
