= Sulaiman Khatib =

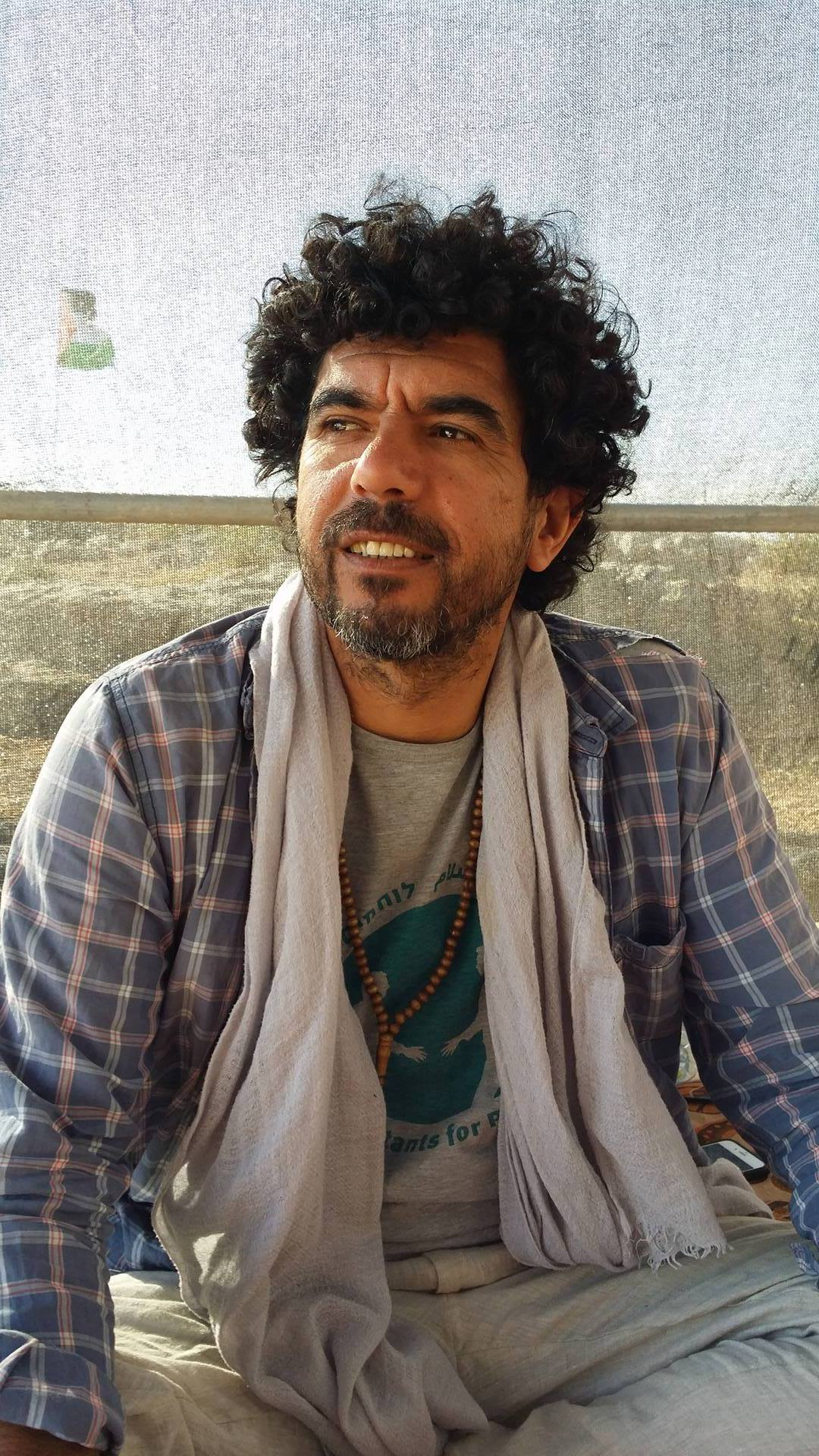
- Born: Hizma, West Bank
- Occupation: Peace Activist
- Organization: Combatants for Peace
- Website: http://cfpeace.org/

Sulaiman Khatib is co-director and co-founder of Combatants for Peace, a bi-national, grassroots nonviolence movement in Israel and Palestine. Combatants for Peace is dedicated to three main pillars: nonviolent direct action, joint partnership between Israelis and Palestinians and ending the Israeli military occupation. Khatib was nominated, along with Israeli co-founder of Combatants for Peace, Chen Alon, for the Nobel Peace Prize in 2017 and 2018. He has been compared in the press to a modern-day Gandhi, Martin Luther King Jr. or Nelson Mandela. He cites these three nonviolence leaders as his personal inspiration and the key to his transformation from violence to nonviolence.

== Early life ==
Khatib was born and spent his early years in Hizma, near Jerusalem. He saw his family being badly impacted by the ongoing conflict, and his desire his family and his community led him to join the violent struggle, as he did not see a peaceful way to make a difference. At 13, Khatib informally became affiliated with the PLO Fatah movement. He participated in illegal activities such as raising Palestinian flags and writing graffiti as well as throwing stones. When he was 14 he and a friend attacked and stabbed two Israeli soldiers in an attempt to steal weapons. The two soldiers were injured and Khatib was sentenced to 15 years in jail.

== Incarceration ==
Khatib has described his imprisonment as brutal: the prisoners were routinely stripped naked and beaten and tear gas was sprayed into prison cells on a daily basis. To improve conditions in the prison, prisoners participated in hunger strikes. The longest strike was in 1992 and lasted 17 days. He credits these hunger strikes for teaching him the virtue of patience as well as giving him deep inner strength and fortitude.

Next he was transferred to the Janad jail, near Nablus. Khatib educated himself in prison and taught himself both Hebrew and English. He calls his self-schooling in jail, "revolutionary University." Khatib started to read about Martin Luther King Jr., Nelson Mandela and Mahatma Gandhi; these nonviolence leaders showed him that there was another path to freedom. At this same time, he started to educate himself about the "enemy": he learned about the history of the Jewish people and he watched Schindler's List, which Khatib credits as changing his life forever. He realized that the other side had an equally compelling counter-narrative to the conflict, and the only way to solve it was to work together. He was released at the age of 25, after ten years and five months in jail.

== Non-violent peace initiatives ==
Upon his release from Israeli prison in 1997, Khatib dedicated himself to peace and reconciliation work. He started working as Office Manager in the Fatah Jerusalem District office, And he joined together with Palestinian friends and founded the Abu Sukar Centre for Peace (later Alquds Centre for Democracy and Dialogue). During the second Intifada, he was one of the main voices calling for non-violent resistance.

- In 2004, he went on a mission to Antarctica with a joint group of Israelis and Palestinians. Their team consisted of eight members: four Israeli, four Palestinian - many of whom were former fighters from both sides. They sailed over 100 km in the world's most dangerous waters and climbed a previously unclimbed peak. The objective: "to find common ground." The expedition forged deep bonds between the participants and gained widespread, international media attention.
- In 2005, he was invited to the United States to participate in joint dialogue with Jewish Americans and Israelis.
- In 2005, he co-founded Combatants for Peace with Israeli and Palestinian friends.
- In 2007, he became the Palestinian General Coordinator of Combatants for Peace.
- In 2008, he co-founded the People's Peace Fund together with his close friend, Gadi Kenny, from Tel Aviv. Which, together with Combatants for Peace brought 11,000 non-violent Palestinian demonstrators together in a rally for Peace.
- In 2010, he became the director of Alquds, an organization that organized joint Israeli-Palestinian sports teams for youth. He led a team of 24 youths, both Israeli and Palestinian in Australian rules football. Their team was known as "The Peace Team," and they traveled across the globe to play other teams from all different nations. When asked about the organization he said, "the main message isn't just about sports or winning the game. It's about winning life.".
- In 2017, Combatants for Peace joined an unprecedented coalition made up of Youth Against Settlements, the Center for Jewish Non-violence, the Holy Land Trust, All That's Left and the South Hebron Popular Resistance Committee in a non-violent direct action called "Sumud Freedom Camp", located in the evicted village of Sarura in the South Hebron Hills.

=== Combatants for Peace ===
In 2014, Khatib became the Palestinian director for Combatants for Peace. Combatants for Peace is the only bi-national, grassroots nonviolence movement in the world that was founded by former fighters on both sides of an active conflict. The Combatants work together in equality and partnership with the goal of spreading their message of peace, security and freedom to both their peoples. In 2016, a documentary was made about the movement called Disturbing the Peace. The documentary features Khatib as well as six other Combatants for Peace in their personal transformations from violence to nonviolence. The film has won awards all across the world, including the first Roger Ebert Humanitarian Award.

Khatib has spoken about challenges posed by working together with Israeli ex-combatants, and the need to see the "human behind the uniform", even Israelis who have been responsible for deaths of Palestinians. He acknowledges there is an imbalance of power between Israelis and Palestinians. His mother, for example, has to get a permit to go to their family land, since it is beyond the separation wall, and the Palestinian participants in Combatants for Peace are still subject to the complications of living under military rule. He believes that it is important, in peace building, to talk about the occupation. Some of his family's land, in particular a parcel to which his grandfather had had a very strong connection and which held very special memories for his family, was cut off from them by the separation wall. They were notified of this during a time when Khatib had already been meeting with Israelis, and Khatib was subject to questioning from his family members about his peace work. The family appealed, but the appeal was denied. After this, the family was only allowed to access the land once a year, and they were not compensated. Even after this, Khatib continued with his work to try to create a more positive environment.

Khatib's main message revolves around hope and forgiveness.

=== Awards ===
Year	Award
2007	"The Search for Common Ground Award"
2009	"The Peace Abbey Courage of Conscience Award"
2009	"The Livia Foundation Conflict Resolution Award"
2009	"The Anna Lindh Euro-Med Award for the Dialogue between Cultures"
2010	"The IIE Victor J. Goldberg Prize for Peace in the Middle East"
2015	"The Tufts Global Leadership, Dr. Jean Mayer Award."
