= 2019 deaths in American television =

The following deaths of notable individuals related to American television occurred in 2019.

== January ==
Date	Name	Age	Notability	Source
January 2	Bob Einstein	76	Actor best known as Super Dave Osborne on Super Dave, Super Dave: Daredevil for Hire, and several other shows; also played Marty Funkhouser on Curb Your Enthusiasm and Larry Middleman on Arrested Development. Also comedy writer on The Smothers Brothers Comedy Hour and The Sonny & Cher Comedy Hour. Brother of Albert Brooks.	
January 2	Gene Okerlund	76	Professional wrestling announcer and interviewer for AWA, WWF/WWE and WCW and member of the WWE Hall of Fame. Made a guest appearance on The A-Team and a Mountain Dew commercial. Also appeared in live-action segments of Hulk Hogan's Rock 'n' Wrestling.	
January 2	Daryl Dragon	76	Musician (Captain & Tennille, The Beach Boys), co-host of The Captain and Tennille Show.	
January 3	Sylvia Chase	80	American broadcast journalist (20/20, KRON-TV/San Francisco)	
January 3	John Falsey	67	Writer/producer, most noted for work on St. Elsewhere, Northern Exposure, and I'll Fly Away	
January 4	Louisa Moritz	72	Cuban-American actress (The Joe Namath Show, Love, American Style, Ironside, One Day at a Time, Chico and the Man, The Rockford Files and The Incredible Hulk)	
January 6	W. Morgan Sheppard	86	Actor (Max Headroom, Star Trek, seaQuest DSV) and voice actor (Biker Mice from Mars, Gargoyles, Prep & Landing)	
January 9	Verna Bloom	80	Actress (Where Have All the People Gone?, Sarah T. – Portrait of a Teenage Alcoholic, Playing for Time)	
January 9	Stefanos Miltsakakis	60	Greek-American MMA-fighter and actor (Matlock, Eerie, Indiana, Baywatch, Martial Law, Nash Bridges and Cold Case)	
January 15	Bill Anagnos	60	American stuntman (TV work includes recurring spots on Banshee, The Sopranos, and Kennedy)	
January 15	Bradley Bolke	93	American voice actor, known for his role of Chumley Walrus on Tennessee Tuxedo and His Tales	
January 15	Carol Channing	97	Emmy Award-winning actress, singer, dancer and comedienne (TV work includes several guest spots on What's My Line?, a recurring role on The Love Boat, and the voice of Grandmama on The Addams Family)	
January 16	Sam Christensen	70	American casting director	
January 17	Barbara Claman	89	American casting director	
January 17	Anthony Potter	84	American producer and writer	
January 17	Daniel C. Striepeke	88	American makeup artist (TV work includes several episodes of Planet of the Apes and Mission: Impossible)	
January 20	William Swan	90	American actor	
January 21	Russell Baker	93	Writer, columnist, and host of Masterpiece Theater	
January 21	Kaye Ballard	93	American actress, comedienne, and singer, best known as Kaye Buell in The Mothers-in-Law, Angie Pallucci in The Doris Day Show, a regular on both Kraft Music Hall and The Perry Como Show, and a record-setting 50 guest appearances on The Tonight Show Starring Johnny Carson.	
January 21	Steve Bean	58	American comedian and actor	
January 21	Merwin Goldsmith	81	American actor (Goodtime Girls, Ryan's Hope, Kennedy, Law & Order and The Good Wife)	
January 22	Kevin Barnett	32	Comedian, actor and writer (The Carmichael Show, Broad City). Co-creator of Rel.	
January 22	James Frawley	82	American director and producer (The Monkees, That Girl, Paper Moon, Magnum, P.I., Vengeance Unlimited, Thieves, Judging Amy, Three Moons Over Milford, Ghost Whisperer, Side Order of Life and Grey's Anatomy)	
January 25	Fatima Ali	29	Pakistani-born American chef and reality show contestant (Chopped, Top Chef)	
January 25	Steve Bell	83	News anchor (Good Morning America, World News This Morning, USA Updates, KYW-TV/Philadelphia) and correspondent for ABC News	
January 26	Ken Welch	92	American composer (The Carol Burnett Show)	
January 27	Erica Yohn	90	Character actress (guest spots on Rhoda, ER, Night Court, Murphy Brown, and Picket Fences)	
January 29	James Ingram	66	Grammy Award-winning singer/songwriter (appeared as himself in Suburgatory and a participant on Celebrity Duets; his 1983 number-one Billboard Hot 100 single "Baby Come to Me" with Patti Austin was featured in General Hospital)	
January 29	Fernando Gaitán	58	Colombian screenwriter, producer, television executive, and journalist, whose telenovela Yo soy Betty, la fea was adapted into the American dramedy Ugly Betty and the Telemundo remake Betty en NY, of which he served as a consultant on both programs	
January 30	Dick Miller	90	Actor (recurring roles on Fame and The Flash)	
January 31	Candice Earley	68	American actress best known for her role of Donna Beck in All My Children	

== February ==
Date	Name	Age	Notability	Source
February 1	Harold Bergman	99	American actor (guest spots on All My Children, One Life to Live, Santa Barbara, Murder, She Wrote, Port Charles, Sunset Beach, and The City)	
February 1	Neal James	55	American reality television actor (Call of the Wildman)	
February 1	Lisa Seagram	82	American actress, acting teacher, and realtor (TV credits include Batman, The Beverly Hillbillies, Bewitched, My Three Sons, My Favorite Martian, The Double Life of Henry Phyfe, Perry Mason, McHale's Navy, Honey West, The Girl From U.N.C.L.E. and Burke's Law)	
February 3	Kristoff St. John	52	American actor; best known for playing Neil Winters on The Young and the Restless. Also played Adam Marshall on Generations.	
February 3	Julie Adams	92	Actress (recurring roles on K-Ville, Loving, Murder, She Wrote, Another World, Capitol, Code Red, and The Jimmy Stewart Show)	
February 4	Gary LaPierre	76	News anchor (WBZ-TV/Boston)	
February 5	George Klein	83	Host of Talent Party on WHBQ-TV/Memphis	
February 7	Albert Finney	82	English actor, producer, and director, who won an Emmy and Golden Globe for his performance as Winston Churchill in The Gathering Storm. Also portrayed Sidney Kentridge in The Biko Inquest, which he co-produced.	
February 9	Salvatore Bellomo	67	Belgian professional wrestler; best known for wrestling preliminary matches in the WWF during the 1980s	
February 10	Linda Sawyer	57	Television producer, writer and director at ABC, MTV and HBO, freelance production work for programs on VH1 and PBS, and podcaster	
February 10	Jan-Michael Vincent	74	American film/TV actor, best known for his television roles as Lincoln 'Link' Simmons in the Danger Island segments of The Banana Splits Adventure Hour, Jeffrey Hastings in The Survivors, Byron Henry in The Winds of War, and Stringfellow Hawke in Airwolf	
February 10	Carmen Argenziano	75	Actor (recurring roles on Stargate SG-1, Booker, L.A. Law, Melrose Place, and The Young and the Restless)	
February 12	Pedro Morales	76	Puerto Rican WWE Hall of Fame professional wrestler	
February 14	David Horowitz	81	Consumer advocate and television show host, alumnus of KNBC Los Angeles and host of Fight Back! with David Horowitz.	
February 16	Jerry Blum	86	American radio executive (most notably GM/president of Atlanta's WQXI and WQXI-FM, 1960–1989) and the inspiration for Gordon Jump's Arthur "Big Guy" Carlson character on WKRP in Cincinnati	
February 16	Patrick Caddell	68	Pollster and Fox News contributor	
February 16	Ken Nordine	98	Voice-over artist and poet (TV work includes Sesame Street)	
February 17	Perry Wolff	97	News documentary producer for CBS News (several projects, most notably A Tour of the White House with Mrs. John F. Kennedy)	
February 21	Beverley Owen	81	Actress best known for playing Marilyn Munster in the first thirteen episodes of The Munsters; guest starring on As the World Turns, The Bold and the Beautiful, Days of Our Lives, General Hospital, Guiding Light, and The Young and the Restless	
February 21	Peter Tork	77	Bassist/keyboardist/singer for The Monkees and actor on the TV show of the same name	
February 22	Clark James Gable	30	Host of Cheaters. Grandson of Clark Gable.	
February 22	Brody Stevens	48	Actor and comedian (star of Brody Stevens: Enjoy It!, guest spots on Late Night with Conan O'Brien, Jimmy Kimmel Live!, Late Friday, Premium Blend, The Late Late Show with Craig Kilborn, Fox NFL Sunday, Conan, Comedy Bang! Bang!, The Burn with Jeff Ross, Kroll Show, The Ben Show, @midnight, and Chelsea Lately)	
February 22	Morgan Woodward	93	Actor best known as Marvin "Punk" Anderson on Dallas. Also guest spots on several other shows including a record amount of roles as several different characters on Gunsmoke.	
February 23	Katherine Helmond	89	American actress best known as Jessica Tate on Soap, Mona Robinson on Who's the Boss?, Doris Sherman on Coach and Lois Whelan on Everybody Loves Raymond.	
February 26	Mitzi Hoag	86	American actress (notable for her regular role as Liz Platt in We'll Get By, and recurring roles in Here Come the Brides and The Facts of Life)	
February 26	Jeraldine Saunders	95	American writer, lecturer, model, and astrologer. Best known as the creator of The Love Boat, (based on her 1974 memoir Love Boats) and whose career as a cruise director was fictionalized in the series as Julie McCoy (played by Lauren Tewes), and the author of "Omarr's Astrological Forecast" (with then-husband Sydney Omarr)	
February 27	Nathaniel Taylor	80	Actor best known for playing Rollo Lawson on Sanford and Son	
February 28	André Previn	89	German-born American conductor, composer, and musician (conductor/host of Previn & The Pittsburgh, music director for The Donald O'Connor Show)	
February 28	William G. Schilling	79	Best known for playing Dr. Harold Samuels on Head of the Class	
February 28	Aron Tager	84	American-born Canadian actor (Are You Afraid of the Dark?)	

== March ==
Date	Name	Age	Notability	Source
March 2	Janice Freeman	33	Singer (contestant on season 13 of The Voice)	
March 4	Keith Flint	49	British singer/dancer and member of the Alternative Dance group The Prodigy (TV appearances include MTV Music Video Awards and guest hosting 120 Minutes; his vocals and videos from "Breathe" (a 1997 VMA winner for Viewer's Choice) and "Firestarter" have been used in numerous television programs and commercials)	
March 4	Luke Perry	52	American actor best known as Dylan McKay on Beverly Hills, 90210, a recurring role as Fred Andrews on Riverdale and guest spots on The Simpsons, Family Guy, Criminal Minds, Law & Order: Special Victims Unit and Will & Grace.	
March 4	Ted Lindsay	93	Canadian Hall of Fame ice hockey player (U.S. TV work included color commentary for the NHL on NBC during the 1970s)	
March 4	Chris Pallies	63	American professional wrestler (better known as King Kong Bundy) and occasional actor (recurring role on Married... with Children, whose lead characters were surnamed Bundy in homage to the wrestler)	
March 5	Susan Harrison	80	American actress, best known for playing the "Ballerina" in The Twilight Zone episode "Five Characters in Search of an Exit" and the mother of Darva Conger, the winner of Who Wants to Marry a Multi-Millionaire?	
March 7	Dick Beyer	88	Legendary professional wrestler	
March 7	Marshall Brodien	84	Magician (Wizzo the Wizard on The Bozo Show)	
March 9	Jed Allan	84	Actor best known as C.C. Capwell on Santa Barbara, Don Craig on Days of Our Lives, Edward Quartermaine on General Hospital, Rush Sanders on Beverly Hills, 90210, Scott Turner on Lassie, Harold Johnson on The Bay, and the host of Celebrity Bowling	
March 10	Rex Sorensen	73	American broadcaster, television/radio executive, and real estate developer (owner of the Sorensen Media Group, the parent company of ABC affiliate KTGM and Fox affiliate KEQI-LP Tamuning, Guam)	
March 16	Larry DiTillio	79	American TV writer (He-Man and the Masters of the Universe, Beast Wars: Transformers, Babylon 5)	
March 16	Richard Erdman	93	American actor (recurring roles on Community, Where's Raymond, The Tab Hunter Show, and Saints and Sinners)	
March 16	Tom Hatten	92	Host of The Popeye Show and Family Film Festival on KTLA/Los Angeles	
March 17	Dick Dale	81	American musician, whose pioneering surf music sound was used in numerous television programs, most notably his signature songs "Pipeline" and "Misirlou"; TV credits include The Ed Sullivan Show	
March 17	Norman Hollyn	66	TV/film editor (TV work includes episodes of The Equalizer and Wild Palms)	
March 20	Jacqueline Rossetti	65	Radio/television personality, broadcaster, and programmer in the Honolulu market (known on air as "Honolulu Skylark"), notably as co-host/emcee for The Merrie Monarch Festival broadcasts and co-founder/host of the Na Hoku Hanohano Awards, both during its broadcast tenure on KITV.	
March 20	Eunetta T. Boone	63	American television writer and producer (One on One, Raven's Home, The Hughleys, Cuts, The Parent 'Hood, My Wife and Kids, Lush Life, Living Single)	
March 21	Chris Corley	55	American voice-over artist on MLB Network and numerous TV stations	
March 23	Denise DuBarry	63	American actress and producer. Founder and president of Palm Springs Women in Film and Television, and creator of The Broken Glass Awards (Credits include Baa Baa Black Sheep, Days of Our Lives, CHiPs and The Love Boat)	
March 23	Larry Cohen	77	American director, producer, and writer (creator of Branded, Blue Light, Coronet Blue, Griff, and The Invaders)	
March 24	Joseph Pilato	70	Actor (recurring roles on Big Bad Beetleborgs and Digimon)	
March 24	Nancy Gates	93	American film/television actress (Studio 57, The Millionaire, 77 Sunset Strip, Hawaiian Eye, Tales of Wells Fargo, Wagon Train, Perry Mason, Burke's Law, and The Mod Squad)	
March 26	Yoji Harada	46	Japanese tattoo artist and reality show personality (Miami Ink)	
March 31	Ermias Asghedom	33	Eritrean American rapper, remixer, entrepreneur, philanthropist, and actor, known by his stage name Nipsey Hussle (appeared in Crazy Ex-Girlfriend)	

== April ==
Date	Name	Age	Notability	Source
April 1	Ron Sweed	70	Nationally syndicated horror host (known as "The Ghoul," an evolution/recasting of the earlier Ghoulardi character)	
April 9	Charles Van Doren	93	Author whose fraudulent winning streak on the scripted game show Twenty One was a defining moment in the 1950s quiz show scandals and the subject of the film Quiz Show in which he was portrayed by Ralph Fiennes; also appeared on and wrote for Wide Wide World and The Today Show	
April 12	Georgia Engel	70	Character actress best known as Georgette Franklin (Baxter) on The Mary Tyler Moore Show. Also starred in Jennifer Slept Here and Goodtime Girls and was the voice of the Snuggle Bear in the Snuggle commercials.	
April 17	Chet Coppock	70	Sports anchor/sports director at Chicago stations WSNS-TV, WMAQ-TV, WISH-TV, and WFLD	
April 20	Jacqueline Saburido	40	Venezuelan activist and burn survivor who campaigned against drunk driving, after a car crash (while visiting Texas in 1999) that left her with burns on 60% of her body and became the face of an anti-drunk driving campaign (appeared twice on The Oprah Winfrey Show and featured in a Discovery Health documentary on face transplants)	
April 21	Steve Golin	64	Oscar and Golden Globe-winning producer, founder of Propaganda Films and Anonymous Content (Executive producer and co-creator of True Detective, Mr. Robot, Catch-22, 13 Reasons Why and The Alienist)	
April 21	Ken Kercheval	83	American actor, best known for his role as Cliff Barnes on Dallas and its 2012 revival, as well as daytime roles on Search for Tomorrow (as Dr. Nick Hunter #1), The Secret Storm and How to Survive a Marriage	
April 23	Jim Dunbar	89	Host of AM San Francisco on KGO-TV, who received several calls from a man claiming to be the Zodiac Killer during an episode in 1969.	
April 29	Tom Ellis	86	News anchor at Boston stations WBZ-TV, WHDH, WCVB-TV, and New England Cable News	
April 29	John Singleton	51	Director, screenwriter and producer (TV work includes Rebel and Snowfall)	
April 29	Doug Adair	89	News anchor at Cleveland, Ohio stations WJW and WKYC; and Columbus, Ohio station WCMH-TV	
April 30	Peter Mayhew	74	English-born American actor, stuntman, author, and businessman, who portrayed Chewbacca in the Star Wars film and television series, as well as appearing as the character on Donny & Marie, Star Wars Holiday Special, The Muppet Show, Star Wars: The Clone Wars, and Glee	

== May ==
Date	Name	Age	Notability	Source
May 2	Chris Reccardi	54	Animator (The Ren & Stimpy Show, Samurai Jack, The Powerpuff Girls)	
May 5	Barbara Perry	97	Actress (The Andy Griffith Show, The Dick Van Dyke Show, The Hathaways, The Donna Reed Show, My Three Sons)	
May 6	Kip Niven	73	Actor (Alice, The Waltons, Blind Ambition, Once an Eagle, Emergency!)	
May 8	Jim Fowler	87	Zoologist and host of Wild Kingdom	
May 9	Allene Roberts	90	Character actress (Adventures of Superman, Dragnet, The Public Defender)	
May 11	Pua Magasiva	38	New Zealand actor (Power Rangers Ninja Storm, Power Rangers Dino Thunder, and Shortland Street)	
May 11	Peggy Lipton	72	American actress/singer, best known for playing Julie Barnes in The Mod Squad, Norma Jenkins in Twin Peaks, Hadley Larson in Angel Falls, Kelly Foster in Popular, Olivia Reed in Alias, and Susie in Crash.	
May 11	Harold Lederman	79	Boxing judge and analyst on HBO World Championship Boxing	
May 12	Elsa Patton	84	Reality television personality (The Real Housewives of Miami, Havana Elsa)	
May 13	Doris Day	97	American actress, singer, and activist, who played Doris Martin in the self-titled The Doris Day Show; other appearances include Doris Day's Best Friends as well as numerous specials and occasional promos for MeTV.	
May 14	Tim Conway	85	Actor best known as Ensign Charles Parker on McHale's Navy and several guest spots (and later a regular) on The Carol Burnett Show. Also recurring roles on SpongeBob SquarePants, Dragons: Riders of Berk, Yes, Dear, Rango, and several versions of The Tim Conway Show.	
May 14	Grumpy Cat	7	Cat best known as the basis for the Internet meme "Grumpy Cat" (portrayed itself in the TV film Grumpy Cat's Worst Christmas Ever in addition to several guest appearances)	
May 16	Steve Duemig	64	American golfer and host on The Golf Channel	
May 16	Ashley Massaro	39	Wrestler (WWE). Also appeared on Survivor: China, guest spots on Smallville and Extreme Makeover: Home Edition and the music videos "Throw It on Me" by Timbaland and "Hell Yeah" by Rev Theory.	
May 20	Ronnie Virgets	77	Reporter on New Orleans stations WDSU and WWL-TV	
May 22	Dick Ellis	69	Journalist at Austin, Texas stations KVUE and KTBC	
May 26	Bart Starr	85	Pro Football Hall of Famer and both quarterback (1956–71) and head coach (1975-83) of the Green Bay Packers (Appearance in the first and second Super Bowl Championships with the Packers, a contributor and commentator for NFL broadcasts including NFL Network films and specials, and host of his weekly review show during his coaching tenure)	
May 30	Leon Redbone	69	Cypress-born Canadian/American jazz/folk singer (Notable for his two appearances on Saturday Night Live in the first season and frequent guest spots on The Tonight Show Starring Johnny Carson, performed the theme songs for Mr. Belvedere and Harry and the Hendersons, a regular role on Between the Lions, guest starred in Life Goes On, commercial work for All detergent, Budweiser, Chevrolet and Ken-L Ration)	

== June ==
Date	Name	Age	Notability	Source
June 1	Brian Taggert	81	American screenwriter (V: The Final Battle and original 1984–85 series, Adam-12 and Emergency!)	
June 2	Alistair Browning	65	New Zealand actor (Hercules: The Legendary Journeys, Xena: Warrior Princess and several entries in the Power Rangers series)	
June 3	Todd Tongen	56	Longtime news anchor/reporter at WPLG in Miami, Florida	
June 4	Bob Welti	94	Longtime weathercaster at KSL-TV in Salt Lake City	
June 6	John Rebbenack	77	Musician best known by the stage name "Dr. John" (performed theme song to Blossom and appeared on SCTV)	
June 11	Linda Giannecchini	70	Executive, Governor, committee member, and trustee with the National Academy of Television Arts & Sciences (a recipient of two Emmys, a Governors' Award, a NATAS service medallion, and an induction to the Silver Circle), whose credentials includes producer, director, line producer, production coordinator, closed captioner and event planner.	
June 15	Franco Zeffirelli	96	Italian film/stage/television director, producer, and politician (Jesus of Nazareth)	
June 17	Gloria Vanderbilt	95	Artist, author, actress, fashion designer, heiress and socialite. TV work includes guest spots on The Love Boat, Person to Person, The Tonight Show Starring Johnny Carson, The Oprah Winfrey Show, Live! with Kelly and Michael, and CBS News Sunday Morning. Mother of CNN anchor Anderson Cooper.	
June 19	Peter Allan Fields	84	American television writer (Star Trek: The Next Generation, Star Trek: Deep Space Nine, The Six Million Dollar Man, The Man from U.N.C.L.E.)	
June 21	Avelino Muñoz Stevenson	62	Puerto Rican sports journalist and father of Jowell. Worked for television stations WIPR-TV, WKAQ-TV, WSJN-TV, and WLII. Also founder of the Cabecitas Rapadas foundation.	
June 21	Jim Taricani	69	American investigative journalist (WJAR/Providence, Rhode Island)	
June 22	Judith Krantz	91	American journalist and novelist, whose adaptations of her best sellers Scruples, Princess Daisy, Mistral's Daughter, I'll Take Manhattan, Till We Met Again, Dazzle, and her made for TV original production Judith Krantz's "Secrets" became popular miniseries, and producer/writer on original TV movie Torch Song.	
June 23	Stephanie Niznik	52	Actress best known for her role as Nina Feeney on Everwood.	
June 24	Billy Drago	73	Actor (TV roles include Hill Street Blues, Moonlighting, Walker Texas Ranger, Trapper John, M.D., The Adventures of Brisco County, Jr. and The X-Files).	
June 25	Russ Ewing	95	American journalist at Chicago stations WLS-TV and WMAQ-TV	
June 26	Beth Chapman	51	American bounty hunter and reality show personality (Dog the Bounty Hunter, Dog and Beth: On the Hunt, and Dog's Most Wanted). Wife of Duane "Dog" Chapman.	
June 26	Max Wright	75	Actor best known as Willie Tanner on ALF, Max Denby on The Norm Show, Dick Stetmeyer on Misfits of Science, and Karl Shub on Buffalo Bill	

== July ==
Date	Name	Age	Notability	Source
July 2	Lee Iacocca	94	Automotive executive who appeared in commercials for Chrysler and for Olivio margarine	
July 3	Arte Johnson	90	Actor/comedian best known for his Emmy-winning role on Rowan and Martin's Laugh-In. Also recurring roles on Don't Call Me Charlie!, Sally, It's Always Jan, and Glitter, and voice work on Animaniacs, The Smurfs, The Flintstone Kids, Yo Yogi!, The 13 Ghosts of Scooby-Doo, The Dukes, Baggy Pants and the Nitwits (which he voiced his Laugh-In character Tyrone Horniegh), and The Houndcats	
July 3	June Bacon-Bercey	90	American meteorologist, who was also a contestant and winner on The $128,000 Question	
July 6	Cameron Boyce	20	Actor; best known as Luke Ross in Jessie, Conor in Gamer's Guide to Pretty Much Everything, the voice of Jake in Jake and the Never Land Pirates and Carlos in the Descendants telefilm franchise. Other roles include guest appearances in Bunk'd, Liv and Maddie, Code Black, General Hospital: Night Shift and Paradise City, and voice roles in Ultimate Spider-Man and Spider-Man.	
July 7	Bob Fouts	97	Sports reporter on San Francisco stations KPIX-TV and KGO-TV. Father of NFL on CBS announcer Dan Fouts.	
July 9	Ross Perot	89	Politician and businessman who appeared as the independent candidate in the 1992 presidential debates.	
July 9	Rip Torn	88	Actor best known for his Emmy-winning role as Artie on The Larry Sanders Show. Also narrator of Ghost Stories and a recurring role on 30 Rock.	
July 10	Denise Nickerson	62	American child actress/singer; TV roles included Amy Jennings and Nora Collins on Dark Shadows, Allison (a member of the Short Circus) on The Electric Company, and a young version of Liza Walton Kaslo Sentell Kendall on Search for Tomorrow. Other roles include Wonderful World of Disney ("Child of Glass"), If I Love You, Am I Trapped Forever?, The Man Who Could Talk to Kids, Flipper, and The Brady Bunch. Best known for playing Violet Beauregard in the frequently-televised film Willy Wonka and the Chocolate Factory	
July 10	Jim Bouton	80	Professional baseball player, author, entrepreneur and sports anchor at New York City stations WCBS-TV and WABC-TV. His 1970 tell-all book, Ball Four, became the basis of a short-lived 1976 sitcom in which he starred as a fictionalized version of himself.	
July 13^{[a]}	Charles Levin	70	Actor (recurring roles on NYPD Blue, L.A. Law, Capital News, Karen's Song, Hill Street Blues, Punky Brewster, and Alice)	
July 14	Ernie Mims	86	Host of Cap'n Ernie's Show Boat on WOC/Davenport, Iowa	
July 18	Ben Kinchlow	82	Author, minister and televangelist, co-host of The 700 Club	
July 18	David Hedison	92	American film/television actor, known for his role as Captain Lee Crane in Voyage to the Bottom of the Sea, Victor Sebastian in Five Fingers, and daytime roles in Another World and The Young and the Restless among his numerous credits, including The Saint, alongside his best friend and Live and Let Die co-star Roger Moore (as James Bond's CIA agent friend Felix Leiter in the first of his two appearances in the 007 film series)	
July 19	Fred Griffith	90	Television personality, host of The Morning Exchange on WEWS-TV/Cleveland, Ohio	
July 19	Bob Losure	72	American television journalist, worked as an anchor for KOTV in Tulsa and CNN Headline News	
July 23	Jeff Maynor	75	American television journalist, worked for WKYC, WEWS-TV and WJW in Cleveland	
July 23	Gabe Khouth	46	Canadian television, film, and voice actor, best known for playing Sneezy/Tom Clark in Once Upon a Time	
July 25	Scott Rubenstein	71	American television writer/story editor best known for writing episodes of Star Trek: The Next Generation, Welcome Back, Kotter, MacGyver, 9 to 5, Night Court, Hunter, Cagney and Lacey, and Diff'rent Strokes	
July 26	Russi Taylor	75	Voice actress best known for providing the voice of Minnie Mouse; also voice of Huey, Dewey and Louie on DuckTales; various roles on The Simpsons	
July 31	O. Leonard Press	97	Instructional/educational television producer; founder and first executive director of the Kentucky Educational Television network	

== August ==
Date	Name	Age	Notability	Source
August 1	Harley Race	76	American wrestler (eight-time NWA World Heavyweight Champion) and manager, and one of six men to be inducted into the WWE Hall of Fame, the NWA Hall of Fame, the Professional Wrestling Hall of Fame and the Wrestling Observer Newsletter Hall of Fame in the same year (2004).	
August 4	Stu Rosen	80	American voice director and actor (Hulk Hogan's Rock 'n' Wrestling, The Legend of Prince Valiant, Fraggle Rock: The Animated Series; creator of Dusty's Treehouse)	
August 9	Ivy Anderson	22	American television journalist at WHNT-TV/Huntsville, Alabama	
August 12	Jim Marsh	73	American basketball player (Portland Trail Blazers) and color commentator (Seattle SuperSonics)	
August 16	Peter Fonda	79	American actor, producer, and activist. Son of Henry Fonda and younger brother of Jane Fonda. (TV work includes Naked City, The New Breed, Wagon Train, The Defenders, Channing, Arrest and Trial, The Alfred Hitchcock Hour, 12 O'Clock High, and In the Heat of the Night and the TV movies Certain Honorable Men, A Reason to Live, Capital City, The Tempest, Thomas and the Magic Railroad, and Journey to the Center of the Earth)	
August 16	Nancy Parker	53	American television journalist at WVUE-DT/New Orleans, WAFB/Baton Rouge, and WSFA/Montgomery	
August 16	Richard Williams	86	Canadian-British animator (U.S. TV work includes the 1971 version of A Christmas Carol and Ziggy's Gift)	
August 18	Jack Whitaker	95	American sportscaster (CBS, ABC), host of The NFL Today	
August 19	Jack Perkins	85	American reporter (WEDU/Tampa, KNBC/Los Angeles, WTCI/Chattanooga) and television host (The Today Show, NBC Nightly News, Biography)	
August 27	Jessi Combs	36	American racer and television host (Xtreme 4x4; guest spots on Overhaulin', MythBusters, The List: 1001 Car Things To Do Before You Die, All Girls Garage, and How to Build... Everything)	
August 30	Valerie Harper	80	American actress, starred as the title characters in Valerie and Rhoda (Rhoda Morgenstern in the latter, a role she originated on The Mary Tyler Moore Show)	
August 30	Gordon Bressack	68	American television writer (Pinky and the Brain, Animaniacs, Bionic Six)	
August 30	Lee Van Ameyde	66	News anchor at WZZM/Grand Rapids, Michigan and news director at WEYI-TV/Flint, Michigan	

== September ==
Date	Name	Age	Notability	Source
September 3	Carol Lynley	77	Actress (recurring role on Fantasy Island and guest spots on several shows)	
September 5	Bill Harris	75	American film critic (At the Movies) and journalist (Entertainment Tonight)	
September 5	Chris March	56	American fashion and costume designer (Project Runway)	
September 7	Robert Axelrod	70	Actor best known as the voice of Lord Zedd and Finster on Power Rangers	
September 9	Fred McLeod	67	American sportscaster for Detroit stations WJBK and WDIV-TV, and play-by-play announcer for the Cleveland Cavaliers, Detroit Lions, and Detroit Pistons	
September 13	Eddie Money	70	American singer/songwriter, actor, and reality television personality (his family and his battle with stage 4 esophageal cancer was the basis for the series Real Money; appeared as himself on The King of Queens, as well as "fictionalized" versions in both The Drew Carey Show and The Kominsky Method; music work for Hardball, commercial work for GEICO, musical appearance as guest VJ on MTV, Solid Gold, The Midnight Special, and American Bandstand. Performed the theme song of Quack Pack. His music video for his 1986 hit "Take Me Home Tonight" with Ronnie Spector was a staple on music video outlets)	
September 15	Phyllis Newman	86	Actress and singer (TV work includes recurring roles on Thirtysomething, One Life to Live, and Coming of Age; guest spots on That Was The Week That Was, The Man from U.N.C.L.E., Burke's Law, ABC Stage 67, Murder, She Wrote, The Wild Wild West, Decoy, and Diagnosis: Unknown; panelist on What's My Line?, Match Game, and To Tell the Truth; and frequent guest on The Tonight Show Starring Johnny Carson)	
September 15	Ric Ocasek	75	American singer/songwriter, music producer, painter, and poetry writer, best known as the lead singer and founder of The Cars (numerous appearances on The Colbert Report; featured in memorable music videos during his tenure with The Cars included "Shake It Up," "Magic," and "You Might Think," the latter which won the first MTV Video Music Award for Video of the Year at the 1984 inaugural event)	
September 16	Sander Vanocur	91	American journalist, reporter, and presenter (White House correspondent and national political correspondent for NBC News, including host of First Tuesday and was the last person to interview Robert F. Kennedy during the 1968 United States presidential election just one day before he was assassinated; Chief Diplomatic Correspondent, Senior Correspondent in Buenos Aires, and anchor for Business World at ABC News; played himself in Without Warning, and hosted History Channel's Movies in Time and History's Business)	
September 17	Cokie Roberts	75	Longtime political commentator and journalist for ABC News	
September 17	Suzanne Whang	56	American comedian, actress and host (hosted House Hunters from 1999 to 2007, recurring roles on Las Vegas and General Hospital)	
September 18	Ed Hopkins	68	American voice-over artist on numerous TV stations	
September 21	Aron Eisenberg	50	American actor best known for portraying Nog on Star Trek: Deep Space Nine. Also recurred as Jerry on The Secret World of Alex Mack.	
September 21	Sid Haig	80	American character actor, main antagonist of Jason of Star Command; guest/recurring roles on Batman, Star Trek, Mission: Impossible, Gunsmoke, The Rockford Files, Electra Woman and Dyna Girl, Buck Rogers in the 25th Century, Get Smart, Fantasy Island, Sledge Hammer!, The A-Team, All My Children, The Fall Guy, The Dukes of Hazzard, Just the Ten of Us, and MacGyver	
September 21	Carl Ruiz	44	American chef and restaurateur (featured on Guy's Grocery Games and Guy's Ranch Kitchen, and a judge on Dinner: Impossible)	
September 22	J. Michael Mendel	54	American television producer (The Simpsons, Rick and Morty, The Critic), four-time Emmy Award winner (1995, 1997, 1998, 2018).	
September 27	Linda Porter	86	American character actress, notable for her recurring roles as Mrytle Vartanian in Superstore and the Lady Slot-Addict in Twin Peaks, as well as the sample lady in a series of Nature Valley Cereal commercials.	
September 28	Hogan Sheffer	61	American television writer (The Young and the Restless, As the World Turns, Days of Our Lives).	
September 30	Wayne Fitzgerald	89	American title designer (The Bronx Zoo, Maverick, Mister Ed, The Beverly Hillbillies, Night Gallery, McMillan & Wife, Dallas, Matlock, Columbo, Guiding Light, The Bold and the Beautiful, and One Life to Live). Emmy winner (1987).	

== October ==
Date	Name	Age	Notability	Source
October 2	Alan Zaslove	91	Animation director and producer (Darkwing Duck, Aladdin, Chip 'n Dale: Rescue Rangers and several others)	
October 3	Lewis Dauber	70	Character actor (guest spots on Who's the Boss?, Diagnosis: Murder, Melrose Place, NYPD Blue, The Suite Life of Zack & Cody, The Bernie Mac Show, and The League).	
October 4	Diahann Carroll	84	Actress/Singer, best known for her groundbreaking role as Julia Baker in Julia, Dominique Deveraux in both Dynasty and The Colbys; regular roles in The Court, Soul Food and host of her self-titled variety series; recurring regular on The Garry Moore Show, White Collar, Grey's Anatomy, and A Different World; TV movie roles in Having Our Say: The Delany Sisters' First 100 Years, A Perry Mason Mystery: The Case of the Lethal Lifestyle, Jackie's Back and Murder in Black and White; miniseries work in Lonesome Dove: The Series and Sally Hemings: An American Scandal	
October 4	James Schmerer	81	Television writer (CHiPs, MacGyver) and producer (The High Chaparral, Chase)	
October 6	Rip Taylor	88	Actor and comedian, host of The $1.98 Beauty Show; regular role as Stanley McCloud on Down to Earth and recurring role on Sigmund and the Sea Monsters; frequent appearances on Hollywood Squares, Super Password, The New Battlestars, The Tonight Show Starring Johnny Carson, and The Mike Douglas Show; voice work on The Emperor's New School, The Addams Family, and Popeye and Son	
October 6	Karen Pendleton	73	American child actress/singer and disability rights advocate. Original member of The Mickey Mouse Club.	
October 7	Wendy Chioji	57	News anchor and reporter at WESH in Orlando	
October 8	Ryan Nicholson	47	Canadian makeup artist (The X-Files, The Outer Limits, Stargate and Andromeda)	
October 11	Robert Forster	78	American actor, (guest star on Murder, She Wrote, Walker, Texas Ranger, appeared in 2017 remake of Twin Peaks, played Bud Baxter on Last Man Standing)	
October 11	Sam Bobrick	87	American television writer best known as the creator of Good Morning, Miss Bliss (the predecessor of Saved by the Bell). Also wrote for The Smothers Brothers Comedy Hour, The Andy Griffith Show, Gomer Pyle, U.S.M.C., Get Smart, Captain Kangaroo, The Flintstones, and Bewitched.	
October 12	Emilio Nicolas, Sr.	88	Mexican-American television station owner (KWEX-TV)	
October 13	Joseph Rice	62	American dancer (American Bandstand) and entertainment agent/manager	
October 17	Elijah Cummings	68	American politician and the member of the U.S. House of Representatives for Maryland's 7th congressional district, civil rights activist/historian, columnist, and frequent guest on numerous news and talk programs	
October 17	Bill Macy	97	Actor best known for playing Walter Findlay on Maude	
October 22	Al Burton	91	American television producer (The Jeffersons, Diff'rent Strokes, One Day At A Time, Mary Hartman, Mary Hartman, Charles in Charge, The New Lassie, Win Ben Stein's Money, Hollywood A Go Go and Romp!!!)	
October 26	Mike Sands	34	American sports anchor (WABG-TV/Greenwood, Mississippi and WDBD/Jackson, Mississippi)	
October 29	John Witherspoon	77	Actor (The Wayans Bros., The Boondocks, The Tracy Morgan Show, Townsend Television, Black Jesus, and The First Family)	
October 30	Bernard Slade	89	Canadian-born American film/television/stage screenwriter, director, and producer. Creator of The Partridge Family, The Girl With Something Extra, Love on a Rooftop, Bridget Loves Bernie and The Flying Nun; story editor on Bewitched	

== November ==
Date	Name	Age	Notability	Source
November 1	Rudy Boesch	91	Retired Navy SEAL and reality show contestant (placed third on the inaugural season of Survivor and reappeared on Survivor All-Stars, hosted Combat Missions and one week of Modern Marvels and made a guest appearance on JAG)	
November 2	Walter Mercado	87	Puerto Rican-born astrologer. Appeared on Primer Impacto and made a guest appearance on Sábado Gigante.	
November 2	Brian Tarantina	60	American actor (The Marvelous Mrs. Maisel, City by the Sea, Gilmore Girls, One Life to Live)	
November 5	Laurel Griggs	13	Child actress (TV appearances include guest spots on Saturday Night Live, Louie and Bubble Guppies)	
November 6	Tazeen Ahmad	48	British foreign correspondent for NBC News	
November 8	Robert "Bob" Norris	90	American rancher and philanthropist, who was an early "Marlboro Man" featured in the Phillip Morris-brand cigarette commercials and print ads during the 1960s, despite the fact he was a non-smoker.	
November 10	Maria Perego	95	Italian animation artist who created the character Topo Gigio (in 1959 with her husband Federico Caldura), who became famous during its appearances on The Ed Sullivan Show from 1963 to 1971, and on numerous television shows in the United States and Puerto Rico.	
November 10	Rick Ludwin	71	American television executive (NBC). Advocated against the cancellation of Seinfeld during its first season and worked on several versions of The Tonight Show; Late Night with Conan O'Brien and Saturday Night Live.	
November 13	Arthur Marks	92	Producer and director (Perry Mason)	
November 20	John Mann	57	Canadian musician (Spirit of the West) and actor (guest spots on Millennium, Dark Angel, Haunted, Blood Ties, Stargate SG-1, Battlestar Galactica, and Smallville)	
November 21	Michael J. Pollard	80	Actor (recurring roles on Toxic Crusaders and Leo & Liz in Beverly Hills and guest spots on numerous shows)	
November 24	Ed Dague	76	Longtime news anchor at WRGB and WNYT in Albany	
November 24	Gregg Mace	65	Longtime sports reporter/anchor/director at WHTM-TV in Harrisburg	
November 25	Frank Biondi	74	American businessman, CEO of HBO (1983), Viacom (1987–1996) and Universal Studios (1996–1998)	

== December ==
Date	Name	Age	Notability	Source
December 1	Shelley Morrison	83	American character actress, best known for her roles as Sister Sixto on The Flying Nun, Rosario Consuelo Yolanda Salazar on Will & Grace, and a recurring role on General Hospital	
December 1	Lil Bub	8	American cat and Internet celebrity (appearances on Good Morning America, Today and The View)	
December 2	D. C. Fontana	80	American television writer (Star Trek: The Original Series, Star Trek: The Next Generation, The Streets of San Francisco, The Waltons, Logan's Run, Dallas, Babylon 5, The Six Million Dollar Man, Captain Simian & the Space Monkeys, Ghost Story, Lancer, The High Chaparral, Bonanza, The Tall Man)	
December 4	Don Chiodo	54	American sportscaster at Michigan stations WNEM-TV (Flint/Tri-Cities) and WPBN/WTOM (Traverse City/Cheboygan)	
December 4	Leonard Goldberg	85	Network executive (ABC, CBS) and producer (Brian's Song, Charlie's Angels, Something About Amelia, Blue Bloods, Hart to Hart, Starsky & Hutch, Fantasy Island, and Family)	
December 5	Robert Walker	79	Character actor (guest spots on Dallas, Beulah Land, The Six Million Dollar Man, and numerous other shows)	
December 6	Ron Leibman	82	Emmy Award-winning American actor, producer, director, and writer (creator and star of Kaz; regular roles in Pacific Station, Central Park West, and Holding the Baby; recurring roles on Friends and The Sopranos; voice work on Archer; daytime role as Johnny on The Edge of Night)	
December 7	Denise D'Ascenzo	61	11-time Emmy Award-winning anchorwoman at WFSB/Hartford	
December 8	René Auberjonois	79	American actor and singer, best known as Clayton Endicott III on Benson, the Changeling Odo on Star Trek: Deep Space Nine and Paul Lewiston on Boston Legal.	
December 8	Caroll Spinney	85	American actor, cartoonist, author, and puppeteer who performed Big Bird, Oscar the Grouch and several other characters on Sesame Street and numerous Muppets-related shows and specials for nearly 50 years.	
December 8	Juice WRLD	21	Rapper and actor. Made guest appearances in Jimmy Kimmel Live! and The Tonight Show Starring Jimmy Fallon.	
December 9	Nina Russell	89	American television writer and actress. Wife of Paul Winchell, she wrote and performed in Winchell-Mahoney Time (1965–1968), and, prior to that, KABC-TV's The Paul Winchell Show (1963-1964)	
December 10	Philip McKeon	55	American actor best known as Tommy Hyatt on Alice	
December 11	Chris Cotton	32	American comedian (Diwal'oween, Gotham Comedy Live, Carpool Rules, Every Damn Day)	
December 12	Danny Aiello	86	American actor (recurring roles on Dellaventura, The Last Don, Lady Blue and The Andros Targets)	
December 14	Chuy Bravo	63	Mexican-born American actor, best known as the co-hosting sidekick on Chelsea Lately and its reality-based spin-off After Lately	
December 21	Joseph Segel	88	American direct marketer and founder of QVC	
December 24	Edward Aschoff	34	College football reporter for ESPN	
December 24	Allee Willis	72	Songwriter who wrote "I'll Be There for You" for The Rembrandts, which became the theme song to Friends	
December 24	Andrew Dunbar		Northern Irish stuntman and actor (Game of Thrones, Line of Duty, Derry Girls)	
December 25	Lee Mendelson	86	Producer notable for his collaborations with Bill Melendez, including many of the Peanuts television specials	
December 26	Jerry Herman	88	Composer (television credits include Mrs. Santa Claus)	
December 27	Don Imus	79	American broadcaster (host of the long-running radio program Imus in the Morning, which was simulcast on TV from 1996 to 2015)	
December 27	Sue Lyon	73	American film/television actress (credits include Letter to Loretta, Love, American Style, and Fantasy Island)	
December 27	Jack Sheldon	88	American singer, trumpeter, and comic actor (starred in Run, Buddy, Run; served as sidekick on The Merv Griffin Show; sang several songs on Schoolhouse Rock including favorites "Conjunction Junction" and "I'm Just a Bill")	
December 28	Carley Ann McCord	30	American sports reporter (WDSU/New Orleans and Cox Sports Television)	
December 28	Bill Smith and Joe Smith	32	British reality show contestants (My Big Fat Gypsy Wedding)	
December 28	Fred Graham	88	American legal correspondent (CBS News) and television anchor (Court TV). Peabody Award winner (1974).	
December 29	Allen Stroud	31	American news reporter (WAFF/Huntsville)	

== See also ==
- 2019 in American television
- Deaths in 2019

== Notes ==
^{a} Body found on this date, actual date of death unknown.
