= Ron Hendren =

American television host (1945–2022)

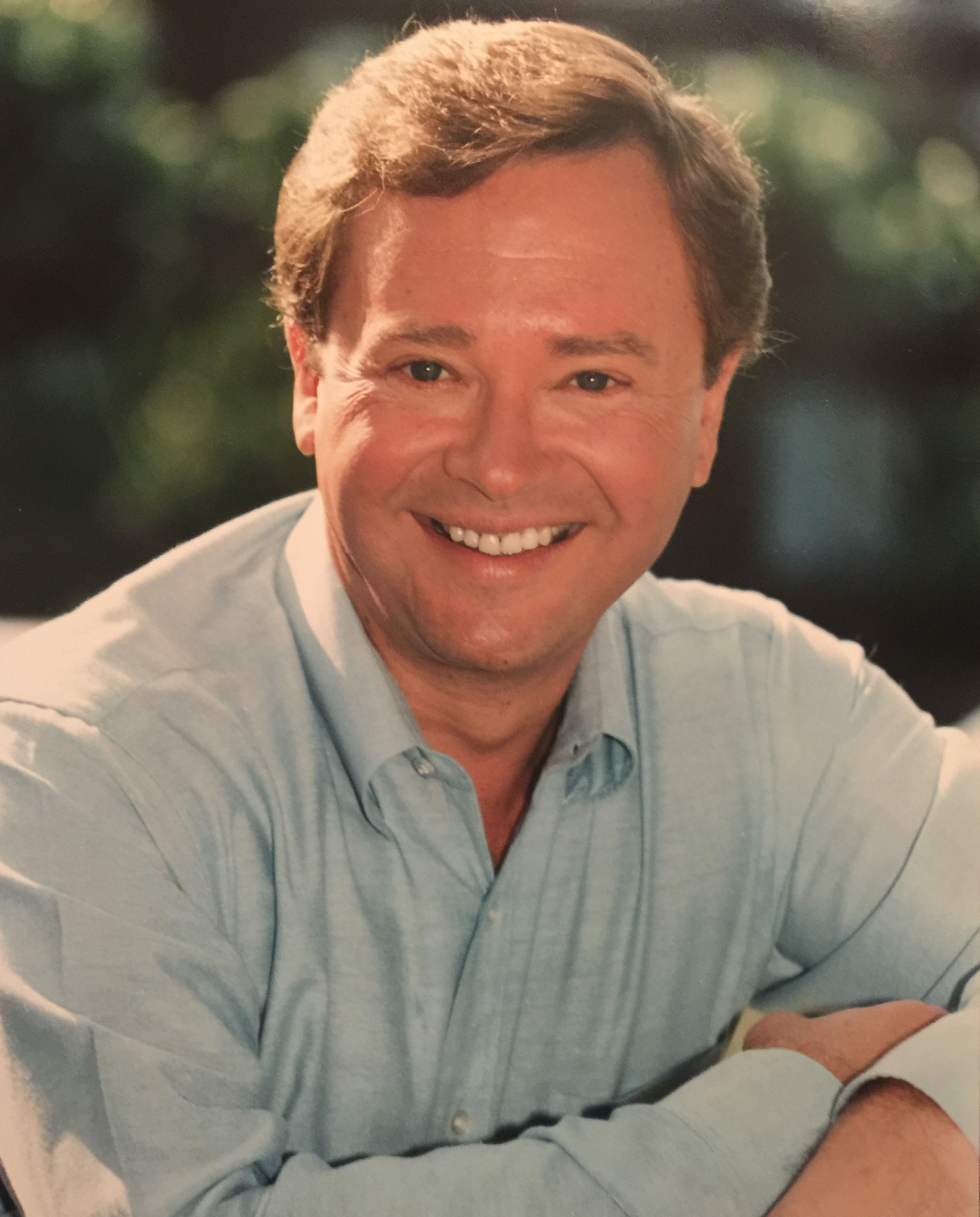
- Hendren in 1995
- Born: Ralph Connolly Hendren; August 3, 1945; Pinehurst, North Carolina, U.S.
- Died: October 12, 2022 (aged 77); Fuquay Varina, North Carolina, U.S.
- Education: University of North Carolina at Chapel Hill
- Occupations: Journalist; television personality
- Known for: Today; Entertainment Tonight

Ralph Connolly Hendren (August 3, 1945 – October 12, 2022) was an American journalist and television personality. He was best known as one of the original hosts of Entertainment Tonight, joining the syndicated television show at its debut in 1981.

Hendren had a brief career in politics, working for politicians that included Sargent Shriver, Stephen M. Young, and B. Everett Jordan. He transferred to a journalism career with a self-syndicated news column in 1972, which was subsequently picked up and distributed nationally as Ron Hendren in Washington by the Los Angeles Times Syndicate. This led to a career as an on-air commentator and critic at the NBC owned and operated station WRC-TV in Washington, D.C. During his tenure at WRC, Hendren was a visiting lecturer in journalism at the University of Maryland at College Park.

Hendren joined the Today Show in 1979, becoming the first on-air network television critic in the United States. He joined Entertainment Tonight in 1981 while at the same time continuing a daily local commentary on KNBC News. Hendren also hosted a nationally syndicated radio program, "TV Tonight with Ron Hendren." After leaving Entertainment Tonight in 1984, Hendren hosted nationally syndicated television programs including "All About Us" and "BreakThrough: Television's Journal of Science and Medicine."

== Early life and education ==
Hendren was born in Pinehurst, North Carolina. He attended the University of North Carolina at Chapel Hill where he majored in journalism and political science. While at UNC, he was a member of the Men's Residence Council and also wrote for The Daily Tar Heel, the school's independent student newspaper. He was named North Carolina's outstanding young leader of 1963 and graduated as a Whitaker Scholar. He moved to Washington, D.C. after graduating in 1967.

He later went on to attend The George Washington University Law School, but left prior to graduating. Hendren joined the North Carolina National Guard where he served from 1968–69, moving on to the United States Army Reserve where he served until 1974.

== Career ==
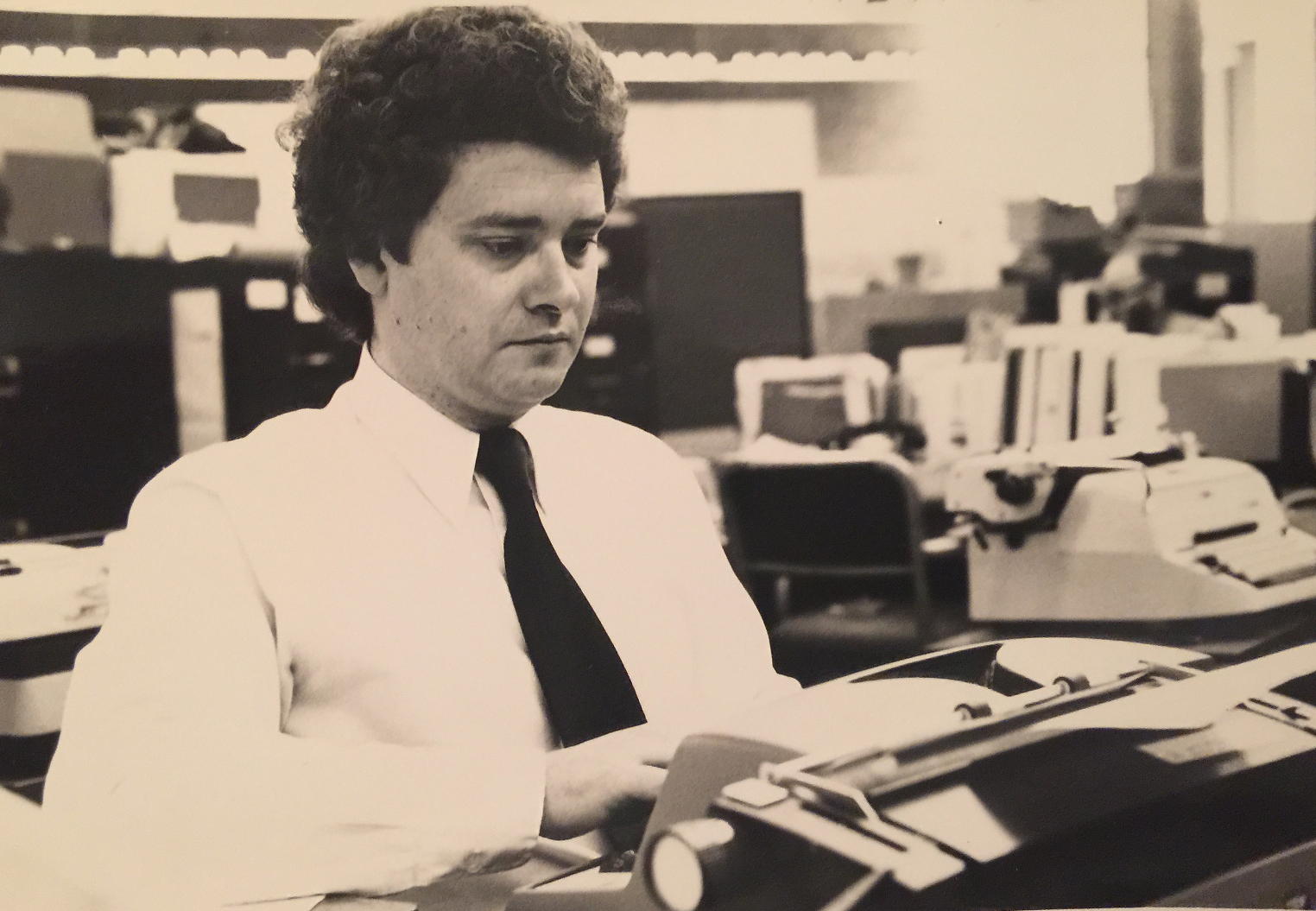
Ron Hendren in the NBC newsroom in 1976.

Hendren's career was initially transitioning into the world of politics. He was a member of President Richard Nixon's Youth Advisory Council on Selective Service in 1969. He went on to become a staff aide to the Hon. R. Sargent Shriver, who headed the Office of Economic Opportunity. He also served as a legislative assistant to then Senator Stephen M. Young (D-Ohio) and later to B. Everett Jordan (D-N.C.). By 1972, Hendren left politics to begin his own Washington news column that was syndicated to more than 100 college and weekly newspapers.

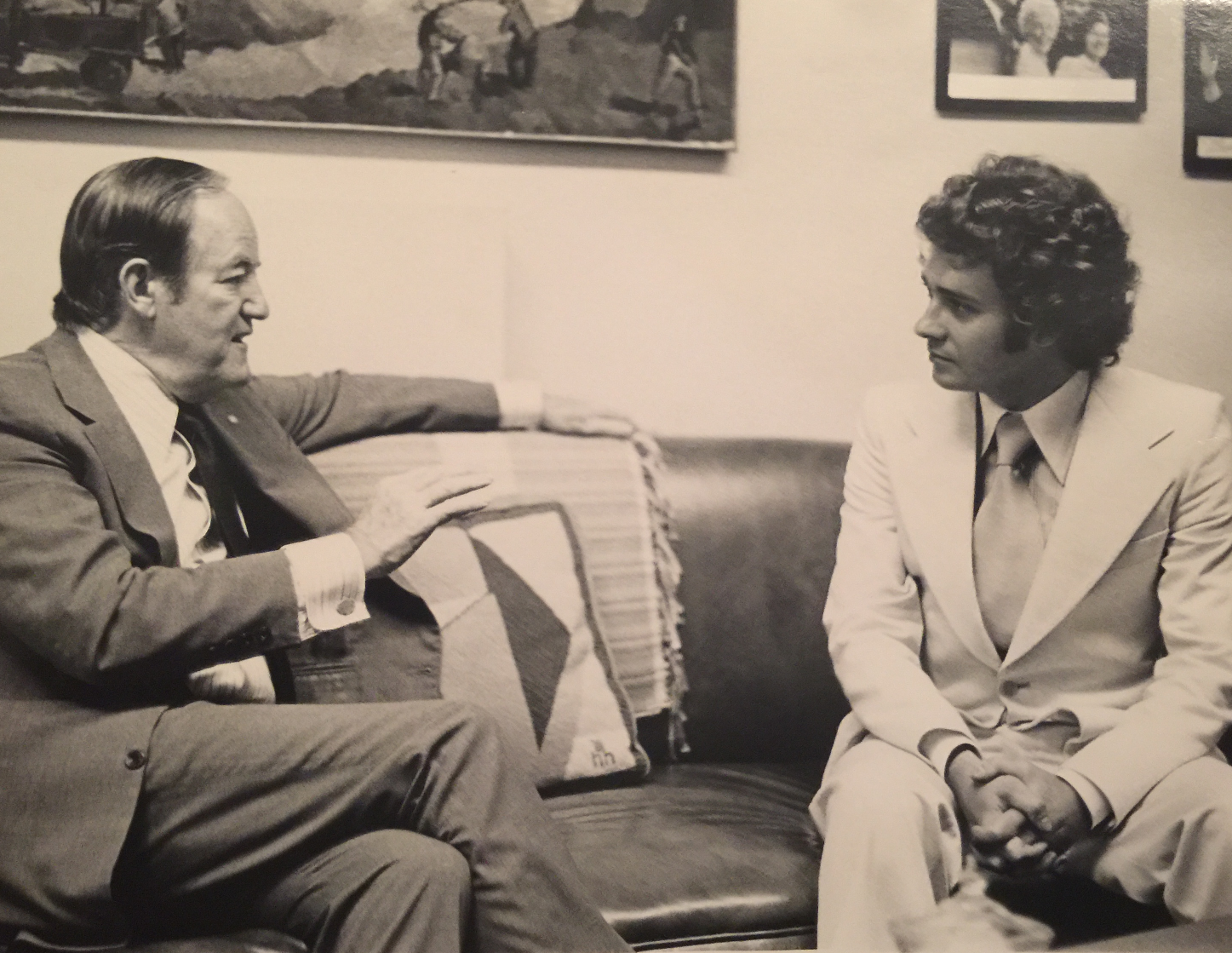
Ron Hendren interviewing former Vice President Hubert Humphrey in 1974.

Hendren became known for his journalism by the mid-1970s with his nationally syndicated newspaper column. About his writing, Editor & Publisher stated, "Ron Hendren sees Washington through eyes still shining with the fire of youth....he gives political columning a new and refreshing twist." In 1975, his column was picked up for national distribution by the Los Angeles Times. During his time with the column, he wrote on many political issues including Turkey–United States relations with Gerald Ford, the equal-time rule as it applies to television stations and presidential candidates, and the investigation of Vice President Spiro Agnew and his subsequent resignation from office. Hendren also began television commentary, working for WRC-TV in Washington. The station expanded his role there to make him the first on-air critic of television in the nation. He subsequently joined KQED (TV), the public television station in San Francisco as a commentator, for which he won a regional Emmy in 1978.

In 1979, Hendren joined the Today Show as its resident television critic, making him the first on-air network television critic in the United States. Part of Hendren's responsibilities included reviewing programming for the networks, including NBC's own programming. He was considered a pioneer for on-air television critics, providing both positive and negative reviews for his own network. In a 1979 interview, then NBC President Fred Silverman stated of Hendren's work, "We hired him on one basis - that if we're going to have a critic, we're going to allow him to be a critic. If he doesn't like our shows, then he has every right to say it. What's the sense of having a critic if you shackle him?" The only restriction placed on Hendren was that he was not allowed to review any morning programming that was in direct competition with the Today Show.

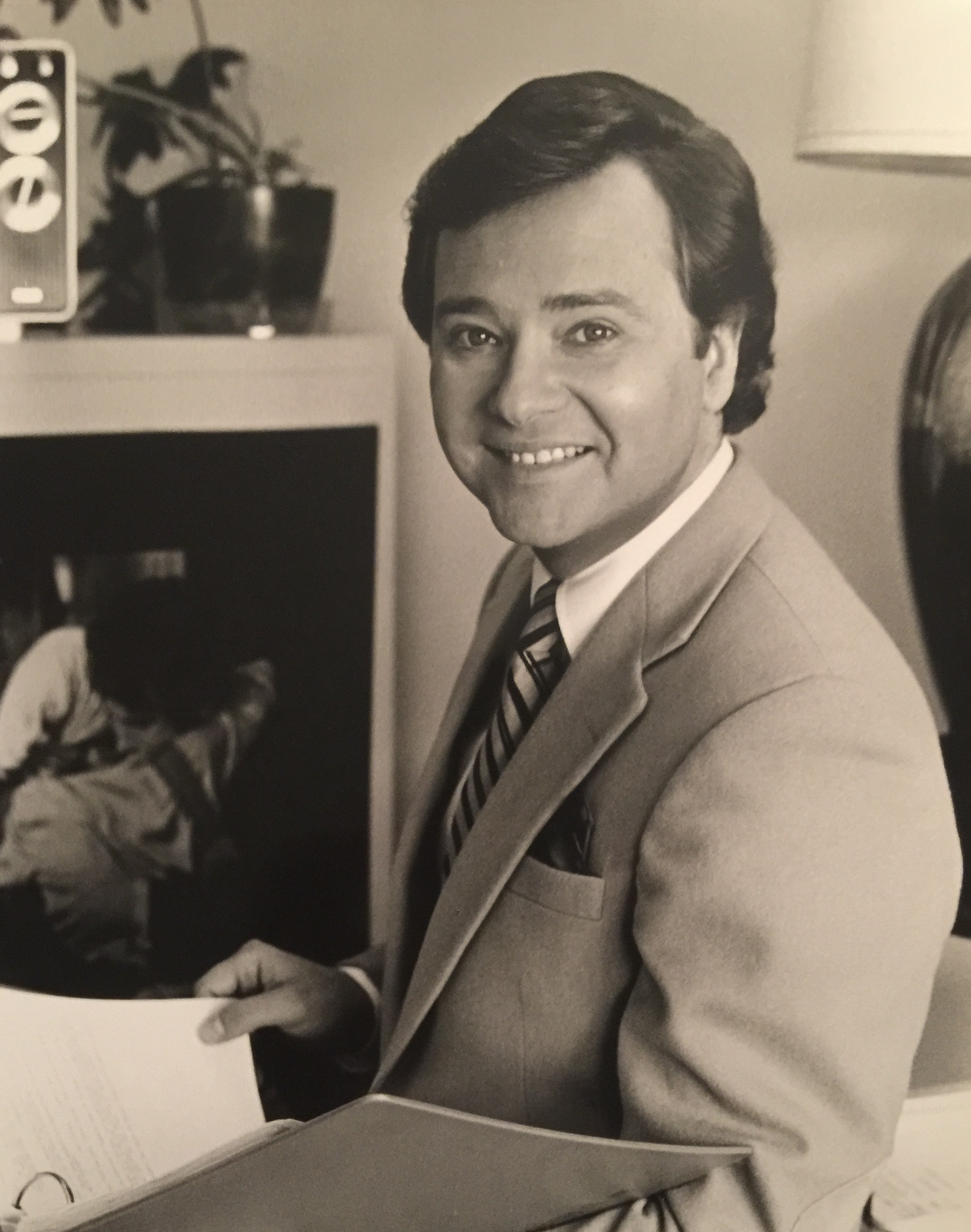
Ron Hendren in his NBC office in 1983.

Hendren was replaced on the Today Show in 1980, in a move said to change its programming closer to its competitor Good Morning America. NBC went from on-air critic to gossip television critique which was performed by correspondents Jane Pauley and Tom Brokaw. Critics called the move a "loss for the series," with TV Guide stating, "those few minutes of his reviews may well have been NBC's finest hour."

Hendren joined Entertainment Tonight as its original co-host in 1981. The show quickly took off, becoming a mainstay in 113 markets throughout the United States, including 29 out of the top 30. He hosted the show first with Tom Hallick and Marjorie Wallace (1981), then with Dixie Whatley (1982) and, finally with Mary Hart from 1982 through 1984. During his time at The Today Show and Entertainment Tonight, Hendren had a daily commentary that ran on KNBC news in Los Angeles. Entitled "Hendren At Large," it ran daily on KNBC and was also broadcast recorded on KRON-TV in San Francisco. The commentary won two Golden Mike awards as well as a 1982 L.A. Press Club award. After his KNBC and KRON contracts were up, Hendren left the stations to rejoin The Today Show as west coast editor and entertainment reporter, a role he continued until his departure from Entertainment Tonight.

After his time at Entertainment Tonight, Hendren hosted the syndicated daily television show All About Us, part of LBS Communications' INDAY programming. He also hosted and co-executive produced the award-winning national public television program BreakThrough: Television’s Journal of Science and Medicine, which aired on more than 200 stations and won 13 national awards in its first and only season.

== Death ==
Hendren died unexpectedly on October 12, 2022, aged 77. He was survived by his wife of 46 years, Jeanne Hendren; daughter Holly Hendren Baldivieso and son Ian Hendren; along with grandson Isaac Hendren.

Preceded by First	Co-host of Entertainment Tonight; 1981–1984	Succeeded by Robb Weller
