= Patsy Yuen =

Jamaican designer and beauty pageant titleholder

Patricia Teresa Yuen Leung (born 1952) is a Jamaican designer and beauty pageant titleholder who was crowned Miss Jamaica World 1973 and placed 2nd runner-up at Miss World 1973 pageant.

== Early life ==
Yuen was born to a Hakka Chinese Jamaican family in Kingston. She began playing tennis while in school. She studied marketing management in Miami, Florida. In 1973, she was 21 years old and working as a salesgirl.

== Pageant wins ==
Yuen entered the Miss Jamaica pageant that year, breaking an "informal colour line" which had seen women of Chinese descent voluntarily restricting themselves from participation in such events. On 5 August 1973, she was named the pageant's winner. She went on to a third-place finish in the Miss World 1973 pageant behind Evangeline Pascual of the Philippines and Marjorie Wallace, the pageant's first American winner. However, Wallace was fired from the Miss World duties after the pageant; organisers extended an offer to Pascual to complete the duties of Miss World for the remainder of the year, but without holding the title; when Pascual turned down that offer, organisers next turned to Yuen, who accepted. During the course of her duties, she expressed concern that "winners find themselves coping with financial commitments out of their reach".

Yuen's strong showing in the Miss World pageant elevated her to the status of a national hero in Jamaica, but also exposed her to controversy. While Yuen was growing up, the Chinese Benevolent Association had held annual Miss Chinese Jamaican pageants, but such "openly racialised" events ceased in 1962 after charges from Afro-Jamaican journalists that the ethnic pride on display there was "unpatriotic" and "un-Jamaican". After her win, she was forced into the awkward position of strenuously denying any connection to her Chinese heritage so that she would not "disrupt the official picture of the country's identity", going as far as to make public proclamations that she preferred Jamaican national dishes like ackee and saltfish and entirely disliked Chinese cuisine. Two years later, Jamaica withdrew from participation in Miss World and Miss Universe events amidst public complaints that black contestants faced discrimination from judges and a lack of coverage by British news media.

== Later career ==
Yuen herself went on to become a partner in Manufacturing Company, Ltd., where she worked as a costume designer; she won the Distinguished Salesman of the Year award from the Kingston Gleaner in 1974. She later married fellow Chinese Jamaican Warwick Lyn, a reggae producer best known as the protégé of Leslie Kong, and emigrated to the United States with him. There, she was the organiser of the Miss Jamaica Miami beauty pageant. She would later return to Jamaica, where she worked as a manager for American Airlines in Montego Bay.
