= Evangeline Pascual =

Filipino beauty queen, actress (b. 1956)

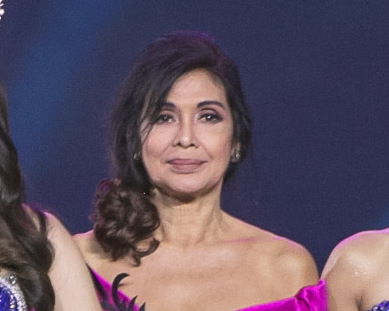
- Born: November 29, 1956 (age 69); Manila, Philippines
- Occupations: Beauty pageant titleholder; actress; model; radio host; television presenter
- Beauty pageant titleholder
- Title: Miss Republic of the Philippines 1973
- Hair color: Dark Brown
- Eye color: Brown
- Major competitions: Miss World 1973 (1st Runner-up)

Evangeline Louise Ancheta Pascual (born November 29, 1956) is a Filipino actress, artist, radio host and beauty pageant titleholder who won Miss Republic of the Philippines 1973 and represented the Philippines at Miss World 1973 where she placed first runner-up.

== Career ==
In 1973, the 23rd annual Miss World pageant was held at the Royal Albert Hall in England. Fifty four delegates vied for the crown, with Miss United States Marjorie Wallace emerging as the winner and 16-year-old Pascual as first runner-up. However, Wallace was fired from her duties as Miss World; pageant organisers extended an offer to Pascual to carry out the duties of Miss World for the remainder of the year without being officially granted the title; Pascual had already signed a film contract and turned down the Miss World offer, which was then accepted by second runner-up Miss Jamaica Patsy Yuen.

She has appeared in film with Fernando Poe, Jr. in Ang Pangalan: Mediavillo (1974), and with Ramon Zamora in The Game of Death (1974) and The Dragon Force Connection (1974). She starred also in Mission: Get The Mastermind (1975) with Roberto Gonzales, The Exit (1975) with Tony Ferrer, and Golden Chaku with Rey Malonzo.

Pascual played as the mother of Valeria played by Sheryl Cruz in GMA-7's TV series Bakekang (2006) starring Sunshine Dizon. And she played as the wife of Juan Rodrigo, and the mother of Matteo Guidicelli in Paraiso (2012) of ABS-CBN.

She hosts a long-running radio show on DWIZ 882 called Echoes of the Heart, where she does radio counselling on the matters of love and life. She is also an artist, her paintings became part of exhibits and were sold both in the Philippines and abroad.

== Personal life ==
Pascual was born in Orani, Bataan.

== Filmography ==
=== Film ===
- The Game of Death (1974)
- Ang Pangalan: Mediavillo (1974)
- The Dragon Connection (1974)
- The Golden Triangle (1975)
- The Exit (1975)
- Golden Chaku (1977)
- Noel Juico, 16: Batang Kriminal (1991)
- The Annabelle Huggins Story – Ruben Ablaza Tragedy: Mea Culpa (1995)
- Judge Max Asuncion: Hukom Bitay (1995) – Atty. Leticia M. Asuncion
- Joe D' Mango's LoveNotes, the Movie ("Someone's Always Saying Goodbye" segment, 1995) – Alice
- Ang Pinakamagandang Hayop sa Balat ng Lupa (1996)
- Maruja (1996) – Irma
- Ikaw Naman ang Iiyak (1996) – Annie's Aunt
- Bayarang Puso (1996) – Lucille Samaniego
- Bridesmaids (1996) – Connie Andrade
- Istokwa (1996) – Cassandra
- Do Re Mi (1996) – Donette's mother
- T.G.I.S.: The Movie (1997) – Annie Rodriguez
- Selosa (1997) – Zeny
- Si Mokong, si Astig, at si Gamol (1997) – Janno's mother
- Kriselda: Sabik sa 'Yo (1997) – Nena Azurin
- Abuso: Case No. 6433 (1997)
- Babae sa Dalampasigan (1997)
- Wala Na Bang Pag-ibig? (1997) – Carmen
- Sanggano (1997) – Clara
- April, May, June (1998)
- Sisa (1999) – Doña Consolacion
- Pangako... Ikaw Lang (2001) – Mrs. Pascual
- Hari ng Selda: Anak ni Baby Ama 2 (2002) – Mrs. Santiago
- Two Timer (2002) – Viveca's mother
- Lastikman (2003) – Larry's mother
- Inter.m@tes (2004)
- La Visa Loca (2005) – Mom of Jess Huson
- Banal (2008) – Mother of Cris Marcelo
- T2 (2009) – Mrs. Villamin
- The Love Affair (2015) – Isabel
- Deadma Walking (2017)
- Ikaw Lang ang Mahal (2022) – Nana Lucrecia

=== Television ===
- Pangako sa 'Yo (2000)
- Umulan Man o Umaraw (2000)
- Maalaala Mo Kaya – Lobo (2001)
- Basta't Kasama Kita (2002)
- Magpakailanman – "The Manny and Pie Calayan Story" (2005)
- Calla Lily (2006)
- Bakekang (2006)
- Maalaala Mo Kaya – "Barko" (2007)
- Daisy Siete: "Tabachingching" (2007)
- Ysabella (2007)
- Pieta (2008)
- May Bukas Pa (2009–2010)
- Beauty Queen (2010–2011)
- Biritera (2012)
- Paraiso (2012–2013)
- Hawak-Kamay (2014)
- You're My Home (2015)
- Sana Dalawa ang Puso (2018)

=== Other ===
- Miss World 1973 (1973)
