= Entertainment Tonight UK =

British entertainment news show

Entertainment Tonight UK (usually presented on screen as simply Entertainment Tonight) is a British version of the celebrity news show Entertainment Tonight. The British show is fronted by Amanda Byram and launched in January 2005 on pay TV channel Sky One. Sky One also screens episodes of the US version a day after the American broadcast.

The British version airs in a weekly hour-long slot and places particular emphasis on British-born celebrities now based in Hollywood; however, the show also recycles some content from the US version.
