= At the Movies (1982 TV program) =

American film review television series

- Genre: Film review
- Presented by: Gene Siskel; Roger Ebert; Rex Reed; Bill Harris; Dixie Whatley
- Country of origin: United States
- Original language: English
- No. of seasons: 8

Production
- Production locations: WGN-TV Studios, Chicago, Illinois
- Running time: 30 minutes
- Production company: Tribune Entertainment

Original release
- Network: Syndicated
- Release: September 26, 1982 – 1990

Related
- Sneak Previews; At the Movies (1986); Ebert Presents: At the Movies

At the Movies (also known as At the Movies with Gene Siskel and Roger Ebert) is an American movie review television program that aired from 1982 to 1990. It was produced by Tribune Entertainment and was created by Gene Siskel and Roger Ebert when they left their show Sneak Previews, which they began on Chicago's PBS station, WTTW, in 1975.

== Background ==
For At the Movies, Siskel and Ebert adopted the same format they had used in their previous series, Sneak Previews: two critics from opposing newspapers view clips from the week's new movies, discuss them, then pass judgment expressed in thumbs up (to approve) or thumbs down (not worth seeing). During this run, they would adopt several elements that would make the show lively. For example, they would bring on an animal called "Spot the Wonder Dog" to help lead into a segment called "The Dog of the Week," covering the week's worst movie. Later, they used another animal, "Aroma the Educated Skunk." Siskel and Ebert would also occasionally feature an "X-Ray segment," in which they discussed current trends happening in the movies. None of these features were carried over when Siskel and Ebert left Tribune/PBS in 1986 over a contract dispute and created Siskel & Ebert & the Movies with Buena Vista Television, whose title was later shortened to simply Siskel & Ebert. (The show re-adopted the At the Movies portion of the title in 2007.)

They were replaced on At the Movies by film critics Rex Reed and Bill Harris, the latter a gossip correspondent for Entertainment Tonight (ET). Under Reed and Harris, the show expanded beyond movie reviews, adding show business news and gossip. Harris left in 1988 and was replaced by former ET host Dixie Whatley.
