= Collegiate School (New Jersey) =

Private school in Passaic County, New Jersey, United States

Location
- 22 Kent Court; Passaic, Passaic County, NJ 07055; United States
- 40.8532°N 74.1328°W

Information
- Type: Private, Day
- Motto: Ut Sapientia Crescamus (In order that we may increase in knowledge)
- Established: 1895; 131 years ago
- NCES School ID: 00868236
- Headmaster: Paula G. Steele
- Faculty: 6.8 FTEs
- Grades: PK-12
- Gender: coeducational
- Enrollment: 40 (plus 6 in PreK, as of 2023–24)
- Student to teacher ratio: 5.9:1
- Accreditation: MSA
- Affiliations: NJAIS
- Website: collegiateschoolpassaic.org

Collegiate School is a private coeducational day school located in Passaic, in Passaic County, in the U.S. state of New Jersey. Established in 1895, the school serves students in pre-kindergarten through twelfth grade. The school has an enrollment of about 160 students. The school has been accredited by the Middle States Association of Colleges and Schools Commission on Secondary Schools since 1974.

As of the 2023–24 school year, the school had an enrollment of 40 students (plus 6 in PreK) and 6.8 classroom teachers (on an FTE basis), for a student–teacher ratio of 5.9:1. The school's student body was 67.5% (0) Hispanic, 15.0% (6) White, 15.0% (6) Black and 2.5% (1) two or more races.

The school aims to provide "a safe, individual oriented environment that stresses basic skills, positive attitudes, values and academic growth." Collegiate is a member of the New Jersey Association of Independent Schools.

== Notable alumni ==
- Frances Goodrich (1890–1984), dramatist and screenwriter, best known for her collaborations with her partner and husband Albert Hackett
- Carl Ruiz (1975–2019), restaurant owner and celebrity chef, best known as a judge on various cooking competition shows on the Food Network
