= Mary Hart =

American television personality (born 1950)

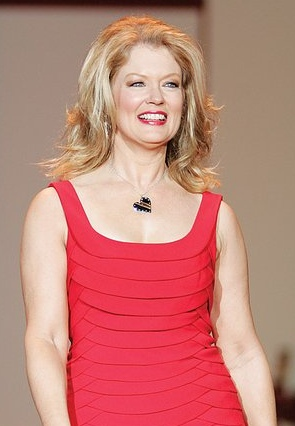
- Hart modeling for The Heart Truth charity fashion show in 2008
- Born: Mary Johanna Harum; November 8, 1950 (age 75); Madison, South Dakota, U.S.
- Occupations: Television personality, talk show host
- Years active: 1972–present
- Title: Miss South Dakota 1970; Semi-finalist Miss America 1971
- Spouses: Terry Hart (m. 1972; div. 1979) Burt Sugarman (m. 1989)
- Children: 1

Mary Hart (born Mary Johanna Harum; November 8, 1950) is an American television personality. She was the host (1982–2011) of the syndicated gossip and entertainment round-up television program Entertainment Tonight. She was Miss South Dakota 1970.

== Early life ==
Mary Harum was born in Madison, South Dakota. She was raised in Sioux Falls, South Dakota, and Denmark. She speaks English, Danish and Swedish fluently.

She graduated from Augustana Academy in 1968 and from Augustana College in Sioux Falls in 1972.

== Career ==
She was crowned Miss South Dakota 1970 and subsequently was a semi-finalist in the Miss America 1971 pageant.

While teaching English at Washington High School for two years, she also produced and anchored her own talk show on then-NBC affiliate KSFY-TV in Sioux Falls.

Hart began her full-time television career in 1975 at WMT-TV (currently KGAN) in Cedar Rapids, Iowa, then moving to KMTV in Omaha, Nebraska. In 1976, she went to KTVY (now KFOR-TV) in Oklahoma City, where, with Danny Williams, she co-hosted the show Dannysday. She also was a sales representative for a school yearbook company. Determined to leave journalism behind, she moved to the Los Angeles neighborhood of Westwood in 1979 with $10,000 in the bank. Hart landed a small role on the soap opera Days of Our Lives as well as some TV commercials. Nearly without money, she became a co-host on the Los Angeles version of the syndicated PM Magazine. That led to a job in 1981 as co-host of Regis Philbin's first national talk show on NBC. When that show was canceled four months later, Entertainment Tonight interviewed her about what it felt like to be canceled. The day after the interview, she was hired as one of its correspondents. Thirteen weeks later, she was named the show's co-host, along with Ron Hendren.

In 1984, Hendren was replaced by Robb Weller, who was replaced by John Tesh in 1986, who was replaced by Bob Goen in 1996. Hart began co-hosting ET with Mark Steines in 2004. Soon after her hiring by ET, Hart chose Jay Bernstein as her manager.

Hart is known for her shapely legs, leading to an endorsement contract with Hanes for that company's line of pantyhose in 1987. Jay Bernstein had her legs insured with Lloyd's of London for $1 million each. Executive Producer Linda Bell Blue described Hart as "the face of ET". On March 29, 1987 she participated in the World Wrestling Federation's WrestleMania III, serving as the guest timekeeper in the main event between Hulk Hogan and André the Giant.

During the summer of 1988, Hart appeared in Las Vegas with comedian David Brenner at the Golden Nugget Hotel and Casino, which realized another of her childhood dreams, singing and dancing on stage. She continued her work on Entertainment Tonight while performing in Las Vegas, flying between the cities after two shows in Vegas, the last at 11:00PM, to film ET the following morning at 8:00AM. In 1991, the New England Journal of Medicine reported that Hart's voice had triggered seizures in an epileptic woman. This was later referenced in an episode of Tiny Toon Adventures and the NBC sitcom Seinfeld, where Kramer (Michael Richards) has convulsions whenever he hears Hart's voice. Hart has been parodied in Animaniacs in the character Mary Heartless. She voiced the cartoon character Fairy Hart in an episode of The Fairly OddParents and in The Fairly Oddparents TV movie Fairly OddBaby.

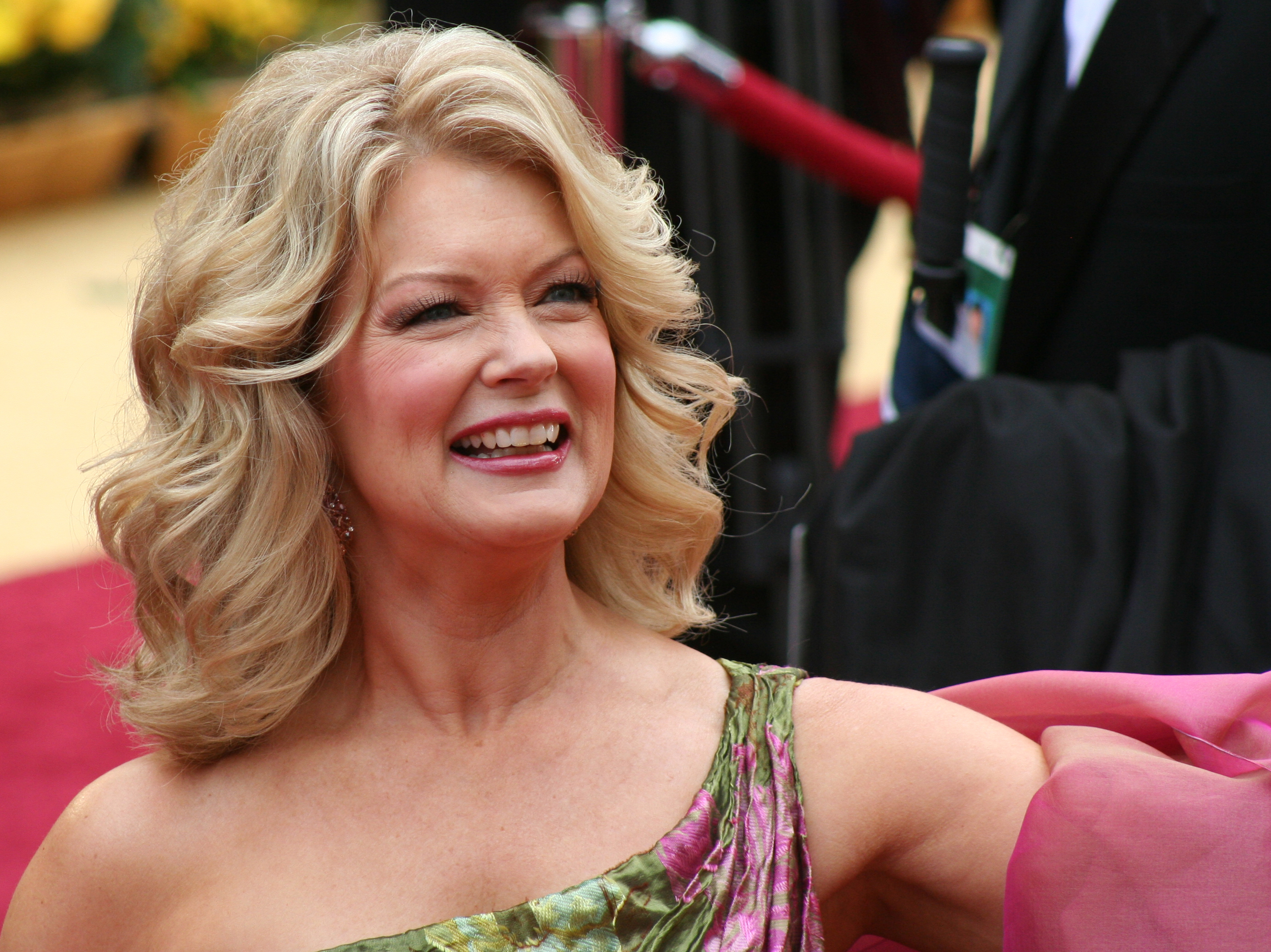
Hart at the 81st Academy Awards in February 2009.

In May 2009, Hart suffered a broken left wrist due to an accident at home (not due to any exotic activity, despite her jokes about it). While her wrist was healing, she wore various brightly colored slings designed to match or complement her wardrobe for each show. On August 5, 2010, Hart announced that she was leaving the show at the end of the upcoming 30th season, citing that she was ready for a change. Hart's final episode aired on May 20, 2011—ending her 29-year history with the program.

Between 2014 and 2016, Hart was a recurring character on the ABC Family sitcom Baby Daddy, as a fictional version of herself who hosts a morning show The Mary Hart Show and is the boss of Tahj Mowry's character Tucker Dobbs.

On October 29, 2015, Hart made a guest appearance on ET, being interviewed by then-current host Nancy O'Dell; her appearance was meant to kick off a month-long celebration of the program's 35th season.

Hart was Master of Ceremonies at July 4th celebration at Mount Rushmore on July 3, 2020. In her remarks, she said, "I remember well the tumultuousness, the tumult, the tragedy, but ultimately the triumph of the sixties. I was growing up then, and those were not easy times – for those of you who happen to be old enough, to remember – but you know what, that was a terrible decade, but we turned out to be a better nation."

== Personal life ==
Hart divorced her first husband, Terry Hart, in the 1970s, but kept his surname. In 1989 she married film producer Burt Sugarman in a private ceremony aboard a yacht. They resided in the Trousdale Estates neighborhood of Beverly Hills, California before moving to a condo in the Ritz-Carlton Residences at L.A. Live in downtown Los Angeles; in 2015 they moved to Sierra Towers. They have a son, Alec "AJ" Sugarman (born 1991), who was a special assistant to President Donald Trump for legislative affairs.

Hart converted to Judaism, her second husband's faith.

Hart is a Republican and supported Marco Rubio in the 2016 Republican Party presidential primaries. She and Sugarman hosted a fundraiser for Rubio in October 2015.

In 2020, Hart hosted the Mount Rushmore Fireworks Celebration at which Trump and South Dakota governor Kristi Noem appeared. Hart was accused of making a white power sign. She denied the accusation.

Hart owns two mansions in Montana. One is a 7,000-square-foot home on 160 acres. Both are within the Yellowstone Club residential community. Since 2000, Hart has also had a home in Palm Desert, California, where she has supported local charities.

Hart is a Los Angeles Dodgers fan and has performed the national anthem before games several times. She can often be seen, from the centerfield camera, behind home plate at Dodger Stadium.

On August 17, 2011, Hart was announced as the official spokeswoman for the Edith Sanford Breast Cancer Initiative.

Preceded by Dixie Whatley	Co-host of Entertainment Tonight; 1982–2011	Succeeded by Nancy O'Dell
