= Garrett Glaser =

American journalist

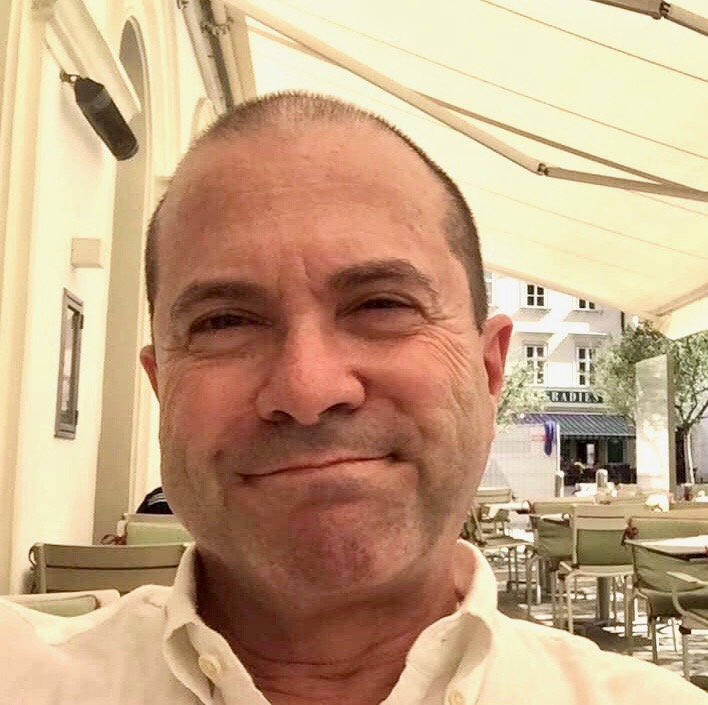
- Occupations: TV news anchor, reporter, producer, media trainer, consultant

Garrett Glaser is a retired news reporter who was the first local television correspondent to come out as gay on the air, and one of the first U.S. television journalists to "come out" publicly as gay.

Although Glaser co-founded the Electronic Media Task Force of the National Lesbian/Gay Journalists Association (NLGJA) in 1990 and was later out to fellow journalists, he was not out to the public at large. That changed in 1994 when Glaser disclosed his sexual orientation during a live report on the Channel 4 News at KNBC-TV Los Angeles as he was reporting on the death of Elizabeth Glaser (no relation), an AIDS activist who founded the Pediatric AIDS Foundation.

Several months earlier, the Los Angeles Times had published a story on the front page of its "Calendar" section about Glaser's status as one of the few openly gay TV reporters in the nation.

Earlier, in an unrelated case, Glaser had become embroiled in a public spat with Los Angeles Times media columnist Howard Rosenberg over Glaser's coverage of the disappearance of music superstar Michael Jackson for KNBC.

Glaser also worked as a TV anchor, reporter or producer at CNBC, Entertainment Tonight, WABC-TV New York. WPLG-TV Miami. WVEC-TV Norfolk VA. WXYZ-TV Detroit. WPTA-TV Fort Wayne IN. WHLW-AM Radio Lakewood NJ and WVNJ AM-FM Radio Newark NJ. He started as a researcher at WCBS-TV's News Election Unit and as a broadcast transcriber for the CBS Evening News With Walter Cronkite at CBS News headquarters in New York in 1976. He also freelanced as a crime reporter for The Villager and a feature writer for the SoHo Weekly News.

== Career in corporate communications ==
In 2005, Glaser left journalism and became a corporate media trainer and CSR (Corporate Social Responsibility) consultant for two US PR and lobbying firms.

Among the corporate clients he counseled were Nestle, McDonald's, H&M, Samsung, Nikon, and Continental AG.

In 2007, he formed Glaser Media, a media training consultancy hired by Fortune 500 companies to train executives to communicate more effectively with news reporters.
