= Anna Maria Groot =

Dutch model (born 1952)

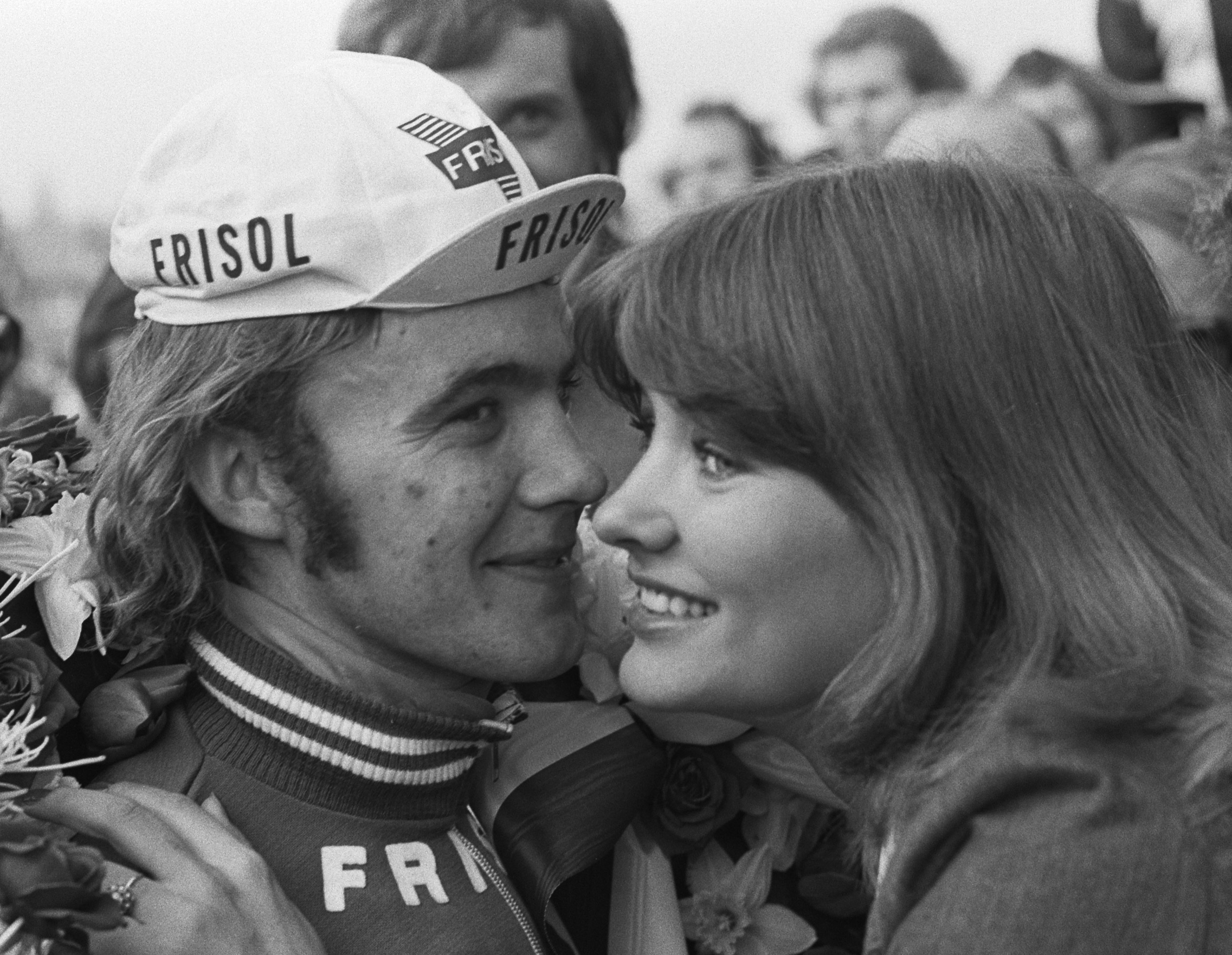
Anke Groot congratulates Theo Smit, winner of the 1974 Ronde van Noord-Holland

Anna Maria "Anke" Groot (Dutch pronunciation: [ˈɑnaː maːˈrijaː ˈʔɑŋkə ˈɣroːt]; born 1952) is a Dutch retired model and beauty pageant titleholder who was crowned Miss Europe 1973.

Groot was the runner-up at Miss Holland 1973 in Roermond, Netherlands. She reached semi-finals at Miss World 1973 in London, where she won the Miss Photogenic special award. She won the 1973 Miss Europe title in Kitzbühel, Austria (the contest was postponed to January 1974).

In August 1974, she announced her retirement as a model and plans to open a bistro where she would become manager and hostess.

Awards and achievements
Preceded by (West Germany) Monika Sarp	Miss Europe; 1973	Succeeded by (Spain) Maria Isabel Lorenzo
