= Miss World 1973 =

23rd Miss World pageant

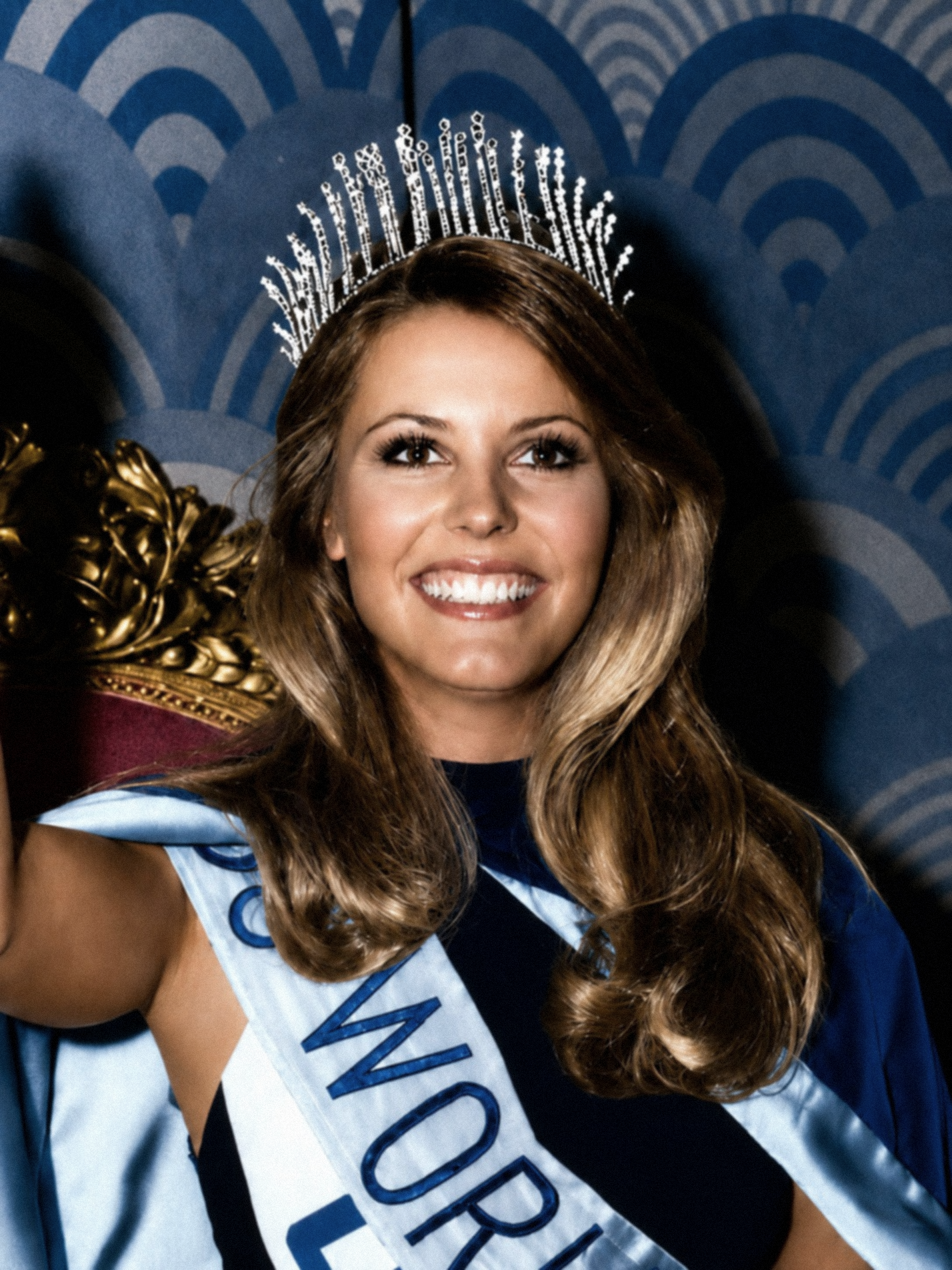
- Marjorie Wallace
- Date: 23 November 1973
- Presenters: Michael Aspel; David Vine
- Venue: Royal Albert Hall, London, United Kingdom
- Broadcaster: BBC
- Entrants: 54
- Placements: 15
- Withdrawals: Costa Rica; Ecuador; Germany; India; Liberia; Paraguay
- Returns: Colombia; Cyprus; Lebanon; Luxembourg; Peru; South Korea; Sri Lanka
- Winner: Marjorie Wallace; United States (Note: dethroned; still recognized as the official winner)

Miss World 1973 was the 23rd edition of the Miss World pageant, held at the Royal Albert Hall in London, United Kingdom on 23 November 1973.

At the end of the event, Belinda Green of Australia crowned Marjorie Wallace of the United States as Miss World 1973. It was the United States' first-ever victory in the history of the pageant. Evangeline Pascual of the Philippines finished as first runner-up, while Patsy Yuen of Jamaica finished as second runner-up.

A little over three months after the pageant, Wallace was stripped of her title after violating the requirements of the title. The title was not offered to any of the runners-up, and Patsy Yuen performed some of the duties and responsibilities of Miss World without holding the title. Although Wallace was stripped of her title, she is still recognized as the official Miss World 1973.

Contestants from fifty-four countries and territories participated in this pageant. Michael Aspel and David Vine hosted the pageant.

== Background ==
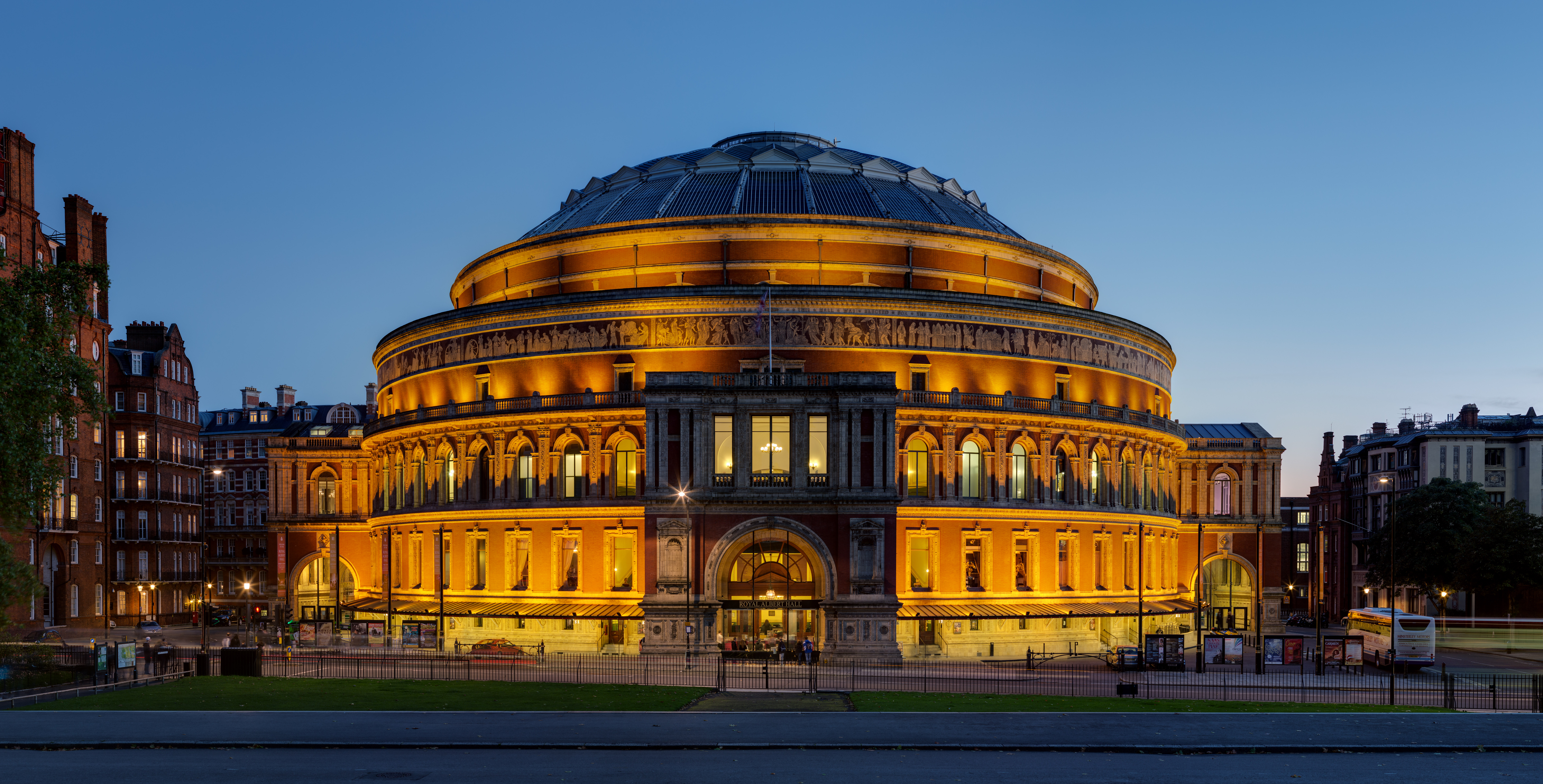
Royal Albert Hall, the location of Miss World 1973

=== Location and date ===
On 9 August 1972, the Miss World Organization announced that there was a possibility this edition would take place on the Cunard Ocean liner Queen Elizabeth 2, a passenger ship during its Caribbean cruise in November 1973. However, this did not materialize and the edition was instead held at the Royal Albert Hall in London, United Kingdom on 23 November 1973.

=== Selection of participants ===
Participants from fifty-four countries and territories were chosen to compete in the pageant. Seven contestants were appointed to represent their countries/territories after placing as runners-up in their national pageants, or were selected through a casting process, and three contestants were appointed after the original delegates withdrew.

==== Replacements ====
Griselda Valdez Minguez was originally scheduled to represent the Dominican Republic in this edition, but she was replaced by Clariza Duarte due to undisclosed reasons. Marjorie Ann Hon was crowned Miss Malaysia World, but after a few days she resigned from her title due to personal reasons. She was replaced by her first runner-up, Narimah Yusoff. Miss Mexico 1973 first runner-up Rosario González was originally scheduled to represent Mexico, but she was replaced by Miss Mexico 1973 Rossana Villares due to undisclosed reasons.

==== Debuts, returns, and withdrawals ====
Returning to this edition were Peru, which last competed in 1968; Colombia and Lebanon, which both last competed in 1970; and Luxembourg, Sri Lanka (as Ceylon), South Korea, and Cyprus, which all last competed in 1971.

Costa Rica, Ecuador, Germany, India, and Paraguay did not compete in this edition. Ingeborg Braun did not compete after a misunderstanding arose between the organizers of Miss Germany and Miss World. Because of this, Braun was sent to Miss International instead. Ana Patricia Rivadeneira of Ecuador did not compete due to undisclosed reasons. Because the Bharat Sundari pageant for 1973 did not take place, Bharat Sundari 1972 second runner-up Firoza Cooper was appointed to represent India at Miss World. However, she did not participate due to undisclosed reasons. María del Rosario Mora of Costa Rica and María Gloria González of Paraguay failed to meet the registration deadline and therefore also withdrew from the competition. Ana Cecilia Saravia of Nicaragua also did not compete due to undisclosed reasons.

=== Controversies ===
==== The dethronement of Wallace ====
During her stay in London, Wallace dated several prominent personalities in the United Kingdom such as English singer Tom Jones, Northern Irish football player George Best, and American Indianapolis 500 and Formula One racecar driver Peter Revson, whom Wallace was reportedly dating during her reign as Miss World.

While dating Revson, Wallace had a relationship with Jones, where they were seen kissing in Barbados, and her relationship with Best drew negative publicity after Wallace accused Best of theft. These actions violated Wallace's contract with Miss World, which prompted Miss World authorities to strip Wallace of her title on 7 March 1974, 104 days after she was crowned. According to Miss World authorities, Wallace failed to fulfill the basic requirements of the title. No runner-up succeeded to the title.

Although the authorities did not award the title, they assigned the duties of Miss World to a runner-up. It was first offered to Evangeline Pascual of the Philippines, but she was not interested in accepting it because she was already filming a movie at the time the Miss World duties were offered to her. Because of this, the duties of Miss World were instead accepted by second runner-up Patsy Yuen of Jamaica.

== Results ==
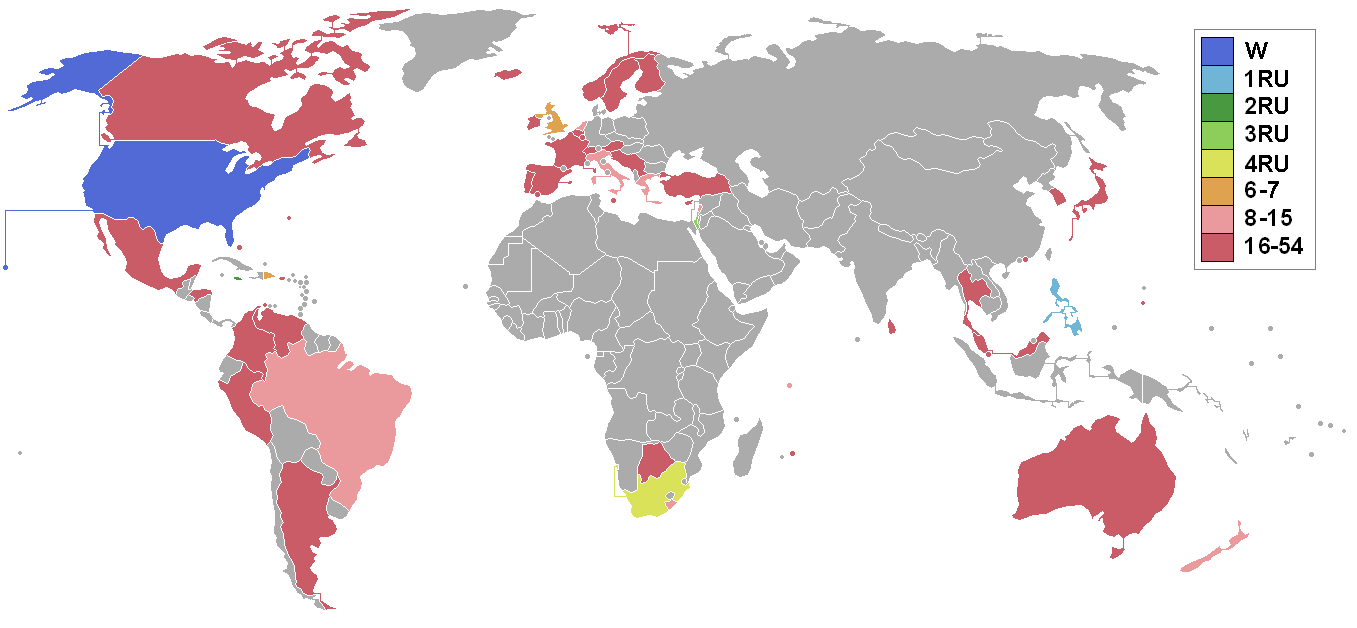
Countries and territories which participated in Miss World 1973 and their placements.

=== Placements ===
Placement	Contestant
Miss World 1973	United States – Marjorie Wallace
1st runner-up	Philippines – Evangeline Pascual
2nd runner-up	Jamaica – Patsy Yuen (Note: assumed duties but not the title)
3rd runner-up	Israel – Chaja Katzir
4th runner-up	South Africa – Shelley Latham
Top 7	Dominican Republic – Clariza Duarte; United Kingdom – Veronica Ann Cross
Top 15	Brazil – Florence Alvarenga; Greece – Caterina Bacali; Italy – Marva Bartolucci; Lebanon – Sylva Ohannessian; Netherlands – Anna Maria Groot; New Zealand – Pamela King; Seychelles – June Gouthier; South Africa (Note: Black representative from South Africa competed as Miss Africa South in the pageant) – Ellen Peters

== Pageant ==
=== Format ===
As in 1961, fifteen semi-finalists were chosen through a preliminary competition held on the day of the final competition, which consisted of the swimsuit and evening gown competitions. The fifteen semi-finalists competed in the swimsuit and evening gown competitions, and seven finalists were subsequently chosen to compete in the final interview.

=== Selection committee ===
- Brenda Arnau – American singer and actress
- Joe Bugner – Hungarian-English boxer
- Michael Crawford – English actor and comedian
- Peter Dimmock – BBC executive
- David Hemmings – English actor
- Engelbert Humperdinck – English singer
- Christopher Lee – English actor
- Suzanna Leigh – English actress
- Gregory Peck – American actor

== Contestants ==
Fifty-four contestants competed for the title.

Country/Territory	Contestant	Age (Note: Ages at the time of the pageant)	Hometown
Argentina	Beatriz Callejón	21	Buenos Aires
Aruba	Edwina Diaz	24	Oranjestad
Australia	Virginia Radinas	22	Sydney
Austria	Roswitha Kobald	18	Styria
(The Bahamas) Bahamas	Deborah Isaacs	21	Nassau
Belgium	Christine Devisch	20	Antwerp
Bermuda	Judy Richards	19	Hamilton
Botswana	Priscilla Molefe	–	Gaborone
Brazil	Florence Alvarenga	18	Campo Belo
Canada	Deborah Ducharme	20	Port Colborne
Colombia	Elsa María Springstube	19	Caldas
Cyprus	Demetra Heraklidou	20	Nicosia
Dominican Republic	Clariza Duarte	18	Santo Domingo
Finland	Seija Mäkinen	–	Helsinki
France	Isabelle Krumacker	18	Troisfontaines
Gibraltar	Josephine Rodríguez	17	Gibraltar
Greece	Caterina Bacali	21	Athens
Guam	Shirley Ann Brennan	17	Agana
Honduras	Belinda Handal	20	Cortés
Hong Kong	Judy Yung	19	Hong Kong
Iceland	Nína Breiðfjörd	22	Reykjavík
(Republic of Ireland) Ireland	Yvonne Costelloe	17	Dublin
Israel	Chaja Katzir	18	Tel Aviv
Italy	Marva Bartolucci	19	Rome
Jamaica	Patsy Yuen	21	Kingston
Japan	Keiko Matsunaga	23	Chiba
Lebanon	Sylva Ohannessian	18	Beirut
Luxembourg	Giselle Azzeri	19	Dudelange
Malaysia	Narimah Yusoff	23	Ipoh
Malta	Carmen Farrugia	18	Żebbuġ
Mauritius	Daisy Ombrasine	20	Port Louis
Mexico	Rossana Villares	18	Yucatán
Netherlands	Anna Maria Groot	21	Zaandam
New Zealand	Pamela King	20	Auckland
Norway	Wenche Steen	22	Oslo
Peru	Mary Núñez	20	Lima
Philippines	Evangeline Pascual	18	Orani
Portugal	Maria Helene Pereira Martins	23	Lisbon
Puerto Rico	Milagros García	23	San Juan
Seychelles	June Gouthier	20	Victoria
Singapore	Debra de Souza	19	Singapore
South Africa	Ellen Peters	17	Cape Town
South Africa	Shelley Latham	22	Cape Town
South Korea	An Soon-young	19	Seoul
Spain	Mariona Russell	19	Catalonia
Sri Lanka	Shiranthi Wickremesinghe	20	Colombo
Sweden	Mercy Nilsson	19	Stockholm
Switzerland	Magda Lepori	21	Bern
Thailand	Pornpit Sakornvijit	18	Bangkok
Turkey	Beyhan Kiral	21	Istanbul
United Kingdom	Veronica Cross	24	London
United States	Marjorie Wallace	19	Indianapolis
Venezuela	Edicta García	18	Zulia
Yugoslavia	Atina Golubova	20	–
