= Denise D'Ascenzo =

American television news anchorwoman (1958–2019)

- Born: January 30, 1958; Washington, D.C.
- Died: December 7, 2019 (aged 61); Branford, Connecticut
- Occupation: News anchorwoman
- Years active: 1981–2019

Denise D'Ascenzo Cooke (January 30, 1958 – December 7, 2019) was an American television news anchorwoman at WFSB-TV in Hartford, Connecticut. She worked there for 33 years (1986–2019), becoming the longest-serving anchor at WFSB-TV. D'Ascenzo was also the longest-serving news anchor at any Connecticut television station.

== Early life and career ==
Born in Washington, D.C., D'Ascenzo grew up in suburban Rockville, Maryland. The daughter of Salvatore Joseph D'Ascenzo (1925–2000) and Rita D'Ascenzo, she was one of four sisters.

At an early age, she became interested in journalism: at age 12, she started the first newspaper in her grammar school; she later on became editor-in-chief of her high school newspaper.

D'Ascenzo was the first person to receive a scholarship from the American News Women's Club, which allowed her to attend a summer journalism program at the Medill School of Journalism at Northwestern University.

In 1980, during her senior year at Syracuse University, D'Ascenzo landed her first television job at WIXT-TV in Syracuse, where she reported on the weather forecast segment. After graduating magna cum laude from Syracuse with dual degrees in broadcast journalism and political science, she began working full-time as a reporter for WIXT.

D'Ascenzo later worked in St. Louis as a reporter and a talk show host at KSDK-TV. She then moved to Cleveland as a news anchor for WJKW-TV.

For 33 years, from 1986 until her death in 2019, she worked at WFSB-TV, becoming the longest-serving anchor at the station. At the time of her death, D'Ascenzo was also the longest-serving news anchor at any Connecticut television station.

== Awards ==
D'Ascenzo won 12 Emmy Awards, including one for Best Anchor. She also received two Edward R. Murrow Awards, seven Associated Press Awards, and a national Gabriel Award for her work.

In 2013, she was inducted to the Silver Circle, an honor bestowed by the National Academy of Television Arts and Sciences for her contributions to broadcasting.

In that same year, D'Ascenzo was awarded an Honorary Doctorate of Humane Letters from Quinnipiac University.

In 2015, she became the first woman to be inducted into the Connecticut Broadcasters Association Hall of Fame.

== Personal life and death ==
D'Ascenzo was married to her husband Wayne Cooke (born 1955); they had one daughter, Kathryn.

On December 7, 2019, D'Ascenzo died in her sleep at her Branford, Connecticut, home. She was 61 years old. Her family suspects that the cause of death was a heart attack.

On January 29, 2020, Connecticut Governor Ned Lamont announced that he had signed a proclamation declaring Thursday, January 30, 2020, as "Denise D'Ascenzo Day" in the State of Connecticut in recognition of the news anchor's birthday.

Following her death, the Denise D'Ascenzo Foundation was formed in 2020 to "support advances in medicine and health, women's and children's issues, and journalism studies."

== See also ==
- 2019 deaths in American television
- List of Syracuse University people
