= Robb Weller =

American television host (b. 1949)

Robb Weller (born September 27, 1949) is an American game show host and television personality and producer (Weller/Grossman Productions).

He hosted Entertainment Tonight from 1984 to 1986, and Entertainment This Week from 1984 to 1989, and was known as the national host of advertorial segments mainly featuring films from Disney's Buena Vista film labels such as Hollywood Pictures and Touchstone Pictures throughout the 1990s. He served as anchor of FOX 11 Sunday Morning News with Gina Silva at KTTV in Los Angeles. He previously co-hosted the former Sunday edition of Good Day L.A. with Nischelle Turner and Elizabeth Espinosa, and hosted the first two seasons of The Home Show on ABC and the syndicated version of Win, Lose or Draw from 1989 to 1990.

He also hosted a few game show pilots, including the 1987 pilot of Blackout (the series went to air with Bob Goen as emcee), an attempted 1990 pilot for Split Second, and 1993's Hollywood Teasers (from producer Merrill Heatter, an attempt at reviving his earlier All-Star Blitz).

He also hosted the local talk shows Celebration! for Warner Cable's QUBE system in Columbus, Ohio, and WLS-TV's AM Chicago, which Oprah Winfrey would eventually take over and turn into her nationally syndicated series. As of 2013, Weller hosted Hollywood Headliners on UBN Radio. Weller also served as the national host of the Tournament of Roses Parade on HGTV from 1999 through 2013 and was cohost of the National Easter Seals Telethon with Pat Boone and Mary Frann for 10 years from 1985 through 1995.

Weller's uncle was narrator, announcer and voice actor Art Gilmore. Robb is a member of Beta Theta Pi fraternity.

Preceded by Mary Hart with Ron Hendren	Host of Entertainment Tonight with Mary Hart; 1984–1986	Succeeded by Mary Hart with John Tesh
