= Jacqueline Saburido =

Venezuelan burn victim (1978–2019)

- Born: December 20, 1978; Caracas, Venezuela
- Died: April 20, 2019 (aged 40); Guatemala City, Guatemala
- Occupation: Spokeswoman
- Known for: Survivor of severe burn injuries sustained in a drunk driving incident
- Parents: Amadeo Saburido (father); Rosalia Saburido (mother)

Jacqueline Saburido (Spanish pronunciation: [ɟʝakeˈlin saβuˈɾiðo]; December 20, 1978 – April 20, 2019) was a Venezuelan activist and burn survivor who campaigned against drunk driving. After a car crash in the United States in 1999, Saburido received burns on 60% of her body; she went on to appear in drunk-driving advertisements and was twice a guest on The Oprah Winfrey Show. She also unsuccessfully tried to become Britain's first face transplant patient.

== Early life and drunk driving incident ==
Jacqueline Saburido was born on December 20, 1978 in Caracas, Venezuela, as the only child to Rosalia and Amadeo Saburido who were both immigrants from the Spanish province of Galicia. Following her parents' divorce when she was very young, she spent most of her childhood in Caracas with her father. Saburido pursued an engineering degree in hopes of taking over her family's highly successful air conditioning manufacturing business that her father established when he was young. In August 1999, feeling overwhelmed by her studies she decided to take a break from her college classes and moved to Austin, Texas to learn how to speak English at a private language school near the University of Texas.

On September 19, 1999, Saburido and several friends left a birthday party near the unincorporated suburb of Lake Travis and accepted a ride home from a classmate, who was driving a 1990 Oldsmobile Ninety-Eight Regency. Shortly into the drive, their vehicle was struck by a customized 1996 GMC Yukon owned and driven by Reginald Stephey, a senior (fourth year) student at Lake Travis High School and a star wide receiver on the school’s football team. Stephey was heavily intoxicated after attending a party with some friends after getting off work, despite Texas state law that strictly prohibits anyone under the age of 21 from buying or possessing alcohol. The collision killed Natalia Chpytchak Bennett, the driver and owner of the Oldsmobile, and Laura Guerrero, one of the passengers. Saburido became trapped inside the burning wreckage. Passing paramedics managed to douse the fire and tried to pull the occupants free, but lacked the equipment needed to free Saburido, and the fire reignited before they could rescue her. Forty-five seconds later, a fire truck arrived and fully extinguished the fire, after which Saburido was airlifted to the burns unit in Galveston.

Despite suffering second- and third-degree burns across more than 60% of her body, Saburido survived. Her fingers had to be amputated, though surgeons were able to salvage enough bone to construct an opposable thumb. She lost her hair, ears, nose, lips, left eyelid, and much of her vision. Saburido subsequently underwent more than 120 reconstructive operations, including cornea transplants to restore her left eye.

In June 2001, Stephey was convicted for two counts of intoxicated manslaughter and sentenced to seven years in prison. Saburido and Stephey met for the first time after his trial and conviction in 2001. Saburido stated that Stephey "destroyed my life completely", but forgave him. Regarding the meeting, Stephey later stated: "What sticks out in my mind is, 'Reggie, I don't hate you.' It's really touching someone can look you in the eyes and have that much compassion after all that I have caused". Stephey was released from prison in 2008.

Saburido was among 21 disfigured people who had approached surgeons at a London hospital to carry out Britain's first face transplant operation; she was not selected. She continued looking into other possibilities for a face transplant in other nations and hospitals.

== Advocacy and media appearances ==
Saburido allowed graphic post-crash photographs of herself to be used in the media (posters, television commercials, and internet chain mail) to illustrate a possible outcome of drunk driving. She is best known for a commercial in which she holds a pre-crash photo of herself in front of the camera, which she lowers to reveal her disfigured face and says, "This is me, after being hit by a drunk driver." When asked why she appeared in the campaign, Saburido stated "I feel very good to do it because I know people can understand a little more what happened to me – why my life changed completely. So I think for me, for everybody, it's a good opportunity." To ensure the material involving Saburido that was used in an ad campaign by the Texas Department of Transportation could also be used in schools, the videos and photos taken of her involved the use of soft lighting to improve her appearance and consultation with child psychologists to ensure the material, although graphic, would not frighten children.

Regarding her life after the crash, Saburido said that she never gave up: "If a person stumbles, he must pick himself up and keep going. I believe this is very important; if not, life would not have much sense." She appeared on The Oprah Winfrey Show on November 17, 2003. She was also interviewed on the Australian 60 Minutes on March 14, 2004, and was featured in a Discovery Health documentary on face transplants. Oprah Winfrey called Saburido the one person she had met who defined "inner beauty" and that she is "a woman who defines survival."

When Stephey was released from the Huntsville Unit in Texas on June 24, 2008, Saburido stated: "I don't hate him, I don't feel bad because he's out, he can reconstruct his life again." On May 20, 2011, Saburido appeared in one of the last episodes of The Oprah Winfrey Show, which was dedicated to Winfrey's favorite guests. Saburido revealed that she had undergone over 120 surgeries by that date.

== Death ==
On April 20, 2019, Saburido died of cancer in Guatemala City. Her family stated that she had moved to Guatemala a few years previously seeking better treatment for her illness. Saburido was buried in her birth city Caracas in a private ceremony.

According to TxDOT's Faces of Drunk Driving Campaign, Saburido's story had been told to at least one billion people worldwide by the time of her death.
