= Entertainment Tonight =

American television series

- Genre: Entertainment
- Created by: Al Masini
- Presented by: Kevin Frazier; Nischelle Turner
- Theme music composer: Michael Mark (original); will.i.am (2012 recomposition)
- Country of origin: United States
- Original language: English
- No. of seasons: 45
- No. of episodes: 13,146 (10,955 weekdays; 2,191 weekend)

Production
- Executive producers: Brad Bessey (2014–2016); Rick Joyce (2016); Sharon Hoffman (2016–2019); Erin Johnson (2019–present)
- Camera setup: Multi-camera
- Running time: 22 minutes (weekday edition); 44 minutes (weekend edition)
- Production companies: Paramount Domestic Television (seasons 1–25); CBS Media Ventures (seasons 25–present)

Original release
- Network: Syndicated
- Release: September 14, 1981 – present

Related
- The Insider

Entertainment Tonight (or simply ET) is an American first-run syndicated news broadcasting newsmagazine program that is distributed by CBS Media Ventures throughout the United States and owned by Paramount Streaming. Having premiered on September 14, 1981, it holds the Guinness World Record as the longest-running entertainment news program on television.

International versions of the show are distributed by Paramount Global Content Distribution.

== Format ==
The format of the program is composed of stories of interest from throughout the entertainment industry, exclusive set visits, first looks at upcoming film and television projects, and one-on-one interviews with actors, musicians and other entertainment personalities and newsmakers.

Logo used until 2014; all on-air logos used since 1994 are based on the "E" and "T" in "Entertainment" seen in the original 1981 logo, but have solely used the abbreviated "ET" name

A one-hour weekend edition, ET Weekend (known as Entertainment This Week until September 1991), originally offered a recap of the week's entertainment news, with most or all episodes later transitioning to center (either primarily or exclusively) around some sort of special theme; though the weekend edition now utilizes either format depending on the episode, most commonly, the format of those broadcasts consists of replays of stories that were shown during the previous week's editions.

ET Radio Minute, a daily radio feature, is syndicated by Westwood One.

As of 2021, the program's weekday broadcasts are anchored by Kevin Frazier and Nischelle Turner. Following the departure of Rachel Smith in September 2025, Frazier and Turner returned as anchors of the weekend editions.

== History ==
In its early years from its September 1981 inception, Entertainment Tonight—following a local newscast-style format—consisted primarily of coverage of the latest movies, music and television releases and projects.

They signed an exclusive agreement to cover the wedding of convicted child molester Mary Kay Letourneau, who married the student she had an affair with, Vili Fualaau; and attorney Howard K. Stern, who represented Daniel Birkhead in the Dannielynn Birkhead paternity case of the late Anna Nicole Smith's daughter Dannielynn. ET aired exclusive stories related to Smith, including coverage of her funeral, and her surviving daughter.

In 1996, actor George Clooney decided to boycott Entertainment Tonight to protest the presence of intrusive paparazzi after Hard Copy did an exposé about his love life, violating an agreement that he had with Paramount, which produced and syndicated both shows. In a letter he sent to Paramount, Clooney stated that he would encourage his friends to do the same.

On September 8, 2008, Entertainment Tonight began broadcasting in high-definition television; concurrently, the program moved its production and studio operations from its longtime home at Stage 28 on the Paramount Pictures studio lot to Stage 4 at CBS Studio Center, one of the final steps involving the incorporation of Paramount's former syndication arm, Paramount Domestic Television, into CBS' distribution arms and the adoption of the then-new CBS Television Distribution name, which all took place following the breakup of CBS and the original Viacom into separate companies in December 2005.

After pressure via a social media campaign by actors Dax Shepard and Kristen Bell, ET announced in February 2014 that it would no longer accept footage or pictures of the children of celebrities from paparazzi photographers.

In January 2020, Entertainment Tonight set the Guinness World Record for the longest-running entertainment news show on TV.

=== ET Live ===
In November 2018, CBS launched a free, 24-hour over-the-top streaming service known as ET Live; it features the correspondents from the linear show with expanded coverage of entertainment news. It is available via web browsers, apps, and most recently, the free streaming service Pluto TV (which added ET Live to its channel lineup in November 2019).

=== Mixible ===
In July 2022, it was announced that the service would be rebranded as Mixible, and continue to air a mixture of entertainment, lifestyle, and pop culture-related programming (including ET's The Download), but with expanded contributions from other Paramount Global properties such as MTV, VH1, Awesomeness, ComicBook.com (formerly), Inside Edition, and The Drew Barrymore Show.

== On-air staff ==
=== Current on-air staff ===
==== Anchor ====
- Kevin Frazier – weekday co-anchor (2014–present; weekend co-anchor 2025–present; previously served as weekend co-anchor/correspondent from 2004 to 2011/2014–2023)
- Nischelle Turner – weekday co-anchor (2021–present; weekend co-anchor 2025–present; previously served as correspondent/substitute weekday anchor from 2014 to 2021 and weekend co-anchor 2021–2023)

==== Correspondents ====
- Deidre Behar - correspondent
- Emily Curl - correspondent
- Cassie DiLaura - correspondent
- Denny Directo - correspondent
- Brice Sander - correspondent

=== Former on-air staff ===
- Brooke Anderson – contributor/substitute weekday anchor (2019–2026); previously served as substitute weekday anchor/correspondent from 2013 to 2015 and as contributor from 2015 to 2018; now at Inside Edition)
- Thea Andrews – fill-in weekend host/correspondent (2006–2009; later at The Insider)
- Army Archerd – correspondent (1981; deceased)
- Rona Barrett – correspondent (1983–1986)
- Chris Booker – correspondent (2002–2003)
- Lisa Canning – correspondent (1995–1998)
- Jann Carl – fill-in weekend host/correspondent (1995–2008)
- Matt Cohen - weekend anchor/correspondent (2019–2023)
- Steven Cojocaru – fashion correspondent (2003–2011)
- Leanza Cornett – correspondent (1994–1995, deceased)
- Rocsi Diaz – weekend co-anchor/correspondent (2013–2015)
- Steve Edwards – weekend co-host (1982–1983)
- Leeza Gibbons – fill-in host/correspondent (1984–1995; later at Extra and co-host of America Now)
- Garrett Glaser – correspondent (1989–1993)
- Bob Goen – co-host/correspondent (1993–2004)
- Bill Harris – correspondent (1984–1985, deceased)
- Samantha Harris – correspondent (2010–2012, 2015–2016)/weekend co-anchor/substitute weekday anchor (2015–2016, now back at Extra)
- Mary Hart – co-host/correspondent (1982–2011)
- Ron Hendren – original co-host (1981–1984; deceased)
- Huell Howser – correspondent (1982–1983; deceased)
- Keltie Knight – correspondent/fill-in weekend anchor/fill-in weekday anchor (2017–2021; now co-host of E! News)
- Vanessa Lachey – correspondent (2005–2007)
- Robin Leach – correspondent (1981–1984; deceased)
- Leonard Maltin – film historian/reviewer (1982–2010)
- Rob Marciano – weekday/weekend co-anchor (2013–2014; later at ABC News, now at CBS News)
- Cameron Mathison – weekend anchor/correspondent (2015–2018; later co-host of Home & Family on Hallmark Channel)
- Maria Menounos – correspondent (2001–2005; later at Access Hollywood, Extra and E! News)
- Julie Moran – correspondent (1995–2001)
- Nancy O'Dell – co-host/correspondent (2011–2019, later at PEOPLE, The TV Show!, now host of Crime Exposé with Nancy O'Dell)
- Carlos Ponce – correspondent (2004–2005)
- Tony Potts – correspondent (1998; later at Access Hollywood; now at CNN and HLN)
- Ahmad Rashad – fill-in weekend co-host (1988–1989); later host of Caesars Challenge and NBA Inside Stuff
- Michael Scott – fill-in host/correspondent (1993–1994)
- Rachel Smith – weekend anchor/correspondent (2019–2025)
- Carly Steel – correspondent (2016–2018)
- Mark Steines – co-host/correspondent (1995–2012; later co-host of Home & Family on Hallmark Channel)
- André Leon Talley – fashion correspondent (2012–2013, deceased)
- John Tesh – co-host/correspondent (1986–1996)
- Marjorie Wallace – host/correspondent (1981)
- Robb Weller – co-host/correspondent (1984–1986)
- Dixie Whatley – co-host/correspondent (1981–1982)
- Roshumba Williams – correspondent (2002)
- Chris Wragge – correspondent (1996–1997, later at WCBS-TV in New York and co-anchor of The Early Show on CBS)
- Lauren Zima – correspondent (2019–2022)

== Competition ==
As of 2007, despite competition from The Insider and even the more general-focus newsmagazine Inside Edition, both also produced by CBS Television Distribution, Entertainment Tonight remained among the ten highest-rated syndicated programs, according to Nielsen ratings weekly ratings. During the 2007–08 season, the program's daytime ratings fluctuated between fourth and fifth place due to competition from fellow CBS-syndicated program Judge Judy.

== International versions ==
The international rights are distributed by Paramount Global Content Distribution.

Country/language	Local title	Host	Channel	Date aired/premiered
Arab World	ET bel Arabi	Mariam Saïd (ar); Badr Al Zaidan (ar); Nadrin Faraj (ar); Shahad Ballan (ar); Aline Watfa(ar); Bassel Alzaro (ar)	MBC 1 MBC Masr 2 MBC Group	January 4, 2015
Brazil	TV Fama	Nelson Rubens; Flávia Noronha	RedeTV!	November 15, 2000
Canada (in English)	Entertainment Tonight Canada	Cheryl Hickey; Roz Weston; Sangita Patel; Carlos Bustamante; Keshia Chanté	Global	September 12, 2005
Thailand	ET Thailand (Entertainment Tonight Thailand); ET Thailand; Entertainment Tonight Thailand		PPTV HD; Thairath TV	March 12, 2018
Jordan	ET بالعربي Jordan	Rania Mazbouh (ar); Amro Jabri (ar)	Roya TV	June 25, 2021
France	Exclusif	Thierry Clopeau; Frédéric Joly; Valérie Bénaïm; Flavie Flament; Emmanuelle Gaume	TF1	May 18, 1998
United Kingdom	Entertainment Tonight UK	Amanda Byram	Sky One	January 2005
