= Dixie Whatley =

American television personality

- Occupation: Television personality
- Years active: 1982–present

Dixie Whatley is an American television personality, an early co-host of the syndicated gossip and entertainment round-up program Entertainment Tonight from 1981 to 1986.

After Mary Hart took over as co-anchor in 1982, Whatley continued as an ET correspondent for about four more years. She also co-hosted a movie review program, At the Movies, with Rex Reed.

Prior to Entertainment Tonight, Whatley was a contestant on Break the Bank on April 22, 1976.

== Biography ==
Whatley was born in the 1950s to John and Beth Whatley. In 1970, she was selected to be a Rose Princess. Whatley graduated from La Cañada High School. She attended the University of Southern California, where she received a master's degree in broadcast journalism.

Her husband, Albert J. Isgur, who had owned Marvel Oil Co., died in 1997 from cancer at the age of 61.

Preceded by Marjorie Wallace	Co-host of Entertainment Tonight; 1981–1982	Succeeded by Mary Hart
