= The Tim Conway Show =

The Tim Conway Show may refer to:

- The Tim Conway Show (1970 TV series), a spring 1970 American situation comedy starring Tim Conway
- The Tim Conway Comedy Hour, a fall 1970 American comedy-variety show starring Tim Conway
- The Tim Conway Show (1980 TV series), a 1980-1981 American comedy-variety show starring Tim Conway
- Tim Conway's Funny America, a 1990 American comedic hidden-camera-prank show starring Tim Conway
- The Tim Conway Jr. Show, a weeknight talk radio program in Los Angeles, California, hosted by Tim Conway Jr.

See also

- Rango (TV series), a 1967 American situation comedy starring Tim Conway
- Ace Crawford, Private Eye, a 1983 American situation comedy starring Tim Conway
