= Michael L. Scott =

American computer scientist (born 1959)

Michael L Scott

Michael Lee Scott (born 1959) is a professor of computer science at the University of Rochester in Rochester, New York.

== Education and teaching ==
Scott received a PhD from the University of Wisconsin–Madison in 1985. He joined the faculty at Rochester the same year as an assistant professor of computer science. Scott was chair of the computer science department from 1996 until 1999, when he was succeeded by Mitsunori Ogihara. He served again as interim chair from July to December 2007 and from July to December 2017.

In 2001, Scott received the University of Rochester’s Robert and Pamela Goergen Award for Distinguished Achievement and Artistry in Undergraduate Teaching.

== Research ==
In 2006, Scott and John Mellor-Crummey were awarded the Edsger W. Dijkstra Prize in Distributed Computing for a paper they wrote in 1991, "Algorithms for Scalable Synchronization on Shared-Memory Multiprocessors."

In 2005, Scott, along with William Scherer III and Doug Lea developed a set of algorithms to handle lock-free concurrent exchanges and synchronous queues. These algorithms are included in the Java 6 concurrency library.

In 2006 he was inducted as a Fellow of the Association for Computing Machinery.

== Notable publications ==
- Scott, Michael L. (2000). Programming Language Pragmatics. San Francisco, CA: Morgan Kaufmann Publishers. ISBN 978-1-55860-442-1. Revised editions in 2006, 2009, 2015.
- Scott, Michael L. (2013). Shared Memory Synchronization. Morgan & Claypool Publishers. ISBN 978-1-60845-956-8.
- Mellor-Crummey, John M.; Scott, Michael L. (1 February 1991). "Algorithms for scalable synchronization on shared-memory multiprocessors". ACM Trans. Comput. Syst. 9 (1): 21–65. doi:10.1145/103727.103729. hdl:1802/13771. ISSN 0734-2071.

== Personal ==
Scott is a Unitarian Universalist. He served as secretary of the New York State Convention of Universalists from 1991 to 1999 and as President from 2001 to 2005. In June 2004, he spoke at the Unitarian Universalist Association General Assembly in favor of electronic voting machines, so long as they retained a paper backup.
