= Bill Harris (journalist) =

American entertainment journalist (1945–2019)

- Born: October 7, 1945; Massachusetts, U.S.
- Died: September 5, 2019 (aged 73); Duarte, California, U.S.
- Occupation: Journalist
- Known for: Co-host of At the Movies (1986-1988)
- Partner: Gregg Barnette (1976-2019)

Bill Harris (October 7, 1945 (Note: Some sources state 1943 as his date of birth.) – September 5, 2019) was an American broadcast journalist in Hollywood best known for being co-hosting the syndicated program At the Movies with Rex Reed from 1986 to 1988.

== Early life ==
Harris had two sisters. He attended Claremont High School.

== Career ==
Harris was one of the first reporters for Entertainment Tonight. He was head writer/reviewer on Rona Barrett's segments for the Today and Good Morning America. He began his career as a writer on The Ralph Story Morning Show on KABC-TV in Los Angeles. He went on to review movies for the syndicated show PM Magazine. He did celebrity interviews for Showtime that ran alongside movies airing on that channel. He wrote for the Victor Awards and the Mrs. America and Mrs. World pageants. He started hosting At the Movies with Rex Reed after the departure of Gene Siskel and Roger Ebert. The two were described as having "no chemistry" and Harris only worked for the program from 1986 through 1988.

== Personal life ==
He was with his partner Gregg Barnette for 43 years. The two of them regularly performed in "Lagunatics", a theatrical fundraiser and satirical look at Laguna Beach.

Harris collected checks written out by famous people as a hobby. His collections included checks from Marilyn Monroe, Judy Garland and Marvin Gaye.

== Death ==
Harris died of cancer at the City of Hope hospital in Los Angeles on September 5, 2019.

== Accolades ==
Harris was nominated for two Emmy Awards for items he was executive producer on. His nominations were for Outstanding Informational Series category for the A&E Biography series (1996) and Outstanding Classic Music-Dance Program category for POPS Goes The Fourth! (2003).
