= Carl Ruiz =

American chef

- Born: April 4, 1975; Passaic, New Jersey, U.S.
- Died: September 21, 2019 (aged 44); Bel Air North, Maryland, U.S.
- Education: Institute of Culinary Education
- Occupations: Chef, restaurant owner, television personality
- Years active: 2002–2019
- Employer: Food Network
- Spouse: Marie Riccio (divorced)

Carl Albert Ruiz (April 4, 1975 – September 21, 2019), also known as Carl "The Cuban" Ruiz, was an American restaurant owner and celebrity chef, best known as a judge on various US cooking competition television series on Food Network, such as Guy's Grocery Games.

== Early life ==
Ruiz was born on April 4, 1975, in Passaic, New Jersey, to Yezzid and Elisa Ruiz. His father was Colombian and his mother Cuban. His brother George credits their mother and grandmother's cooking for inspiring Carl. He attended the Collegiate School. He was a classically-trained chef who graduated from the Institute of Culinary Education, in New York City.

== Career ==
Ruiz worked as a sous chef at Dish, a restaurant in Clifton, New Jersey, before being hired as executive chef at Sabor in North Bergen, New Jersey circa 2002. In July 2002, he was hired by the new owner of Stephen's Cafe of North Bergen as a consulting chef for a relaunch of the operation. Ruiz relocated to New York City as the first decade of the 21st century came to a close, working as an executive chef at Son Cubano, a short-lived Cuban restaurant on West 27th Street in Manhattan. The 80-seat restaurant featured live Cuban music and a night club atmosphere.

By 2011, Ruiz was executive chef at Brick Oven in Morristown, New Jersey. Together with his then wife, Marie Riccio, on October 10, 2011, Ruiz opened an Italian deli and cafe, Marie's Italian Specialties, in the Hickory Square Mall in Chatham Township, New Jersey. This cafe was memorably referred to by one food reviewer as "the type of deli you might have visited as a child when visiting your grandmother's house—if your grandmother lived in Hoboken or Jersey City in the 1950s."

It was through this restaurant, and its distinctive food, that Ruiz first made the acquaintance of celebrity chef Guy Fieri. Fieri filmed an episode of his popular Food Network television show Diners, Drive-Ins and Dives featuring Marie's Italian Specialties in October 2012, with an initial air date of January 21, 2013. Fieri would ultimately feature the restaurant twice on the show, boosting the popularity of the nine table deli as well as Ruiz's professional profile. Ruiz was later hired to be a judge on other shows starring Fieri, including Guy's Grocery Games and Guy's Ranch Kitchen.

Ruiz and Riccio subsequently divorced, with Riccio retaining Marie's Italian Specialties following the split. In June 2019, Ruiz opened a new restaurant specializing in authentic Cuban fare, called La Cubana, in the Meatpacking District of New York City. Ruiz held the position of Executive Chef at the new eatery. Through connection to Fieri, Ruiz would become a frequent guest on the SiriusXM radio show Opie and Anthony and its successor, The Opie Radio Show, along with Sherrod Small and Vic Henley. Ruiz was also an outspoken critic of veganism and vegetarianism in general.

== Death ==
Ruiz died in his sleep on Saturday, September 21, 2019, aged 44. The cause of death was determined to be atherosclerotic cardiovascular disease. He was visiting friends in Bel Air, Maryland, when he died.
