= Marjorie Wallace =

American actress, television host and beauty queen (born 1954)

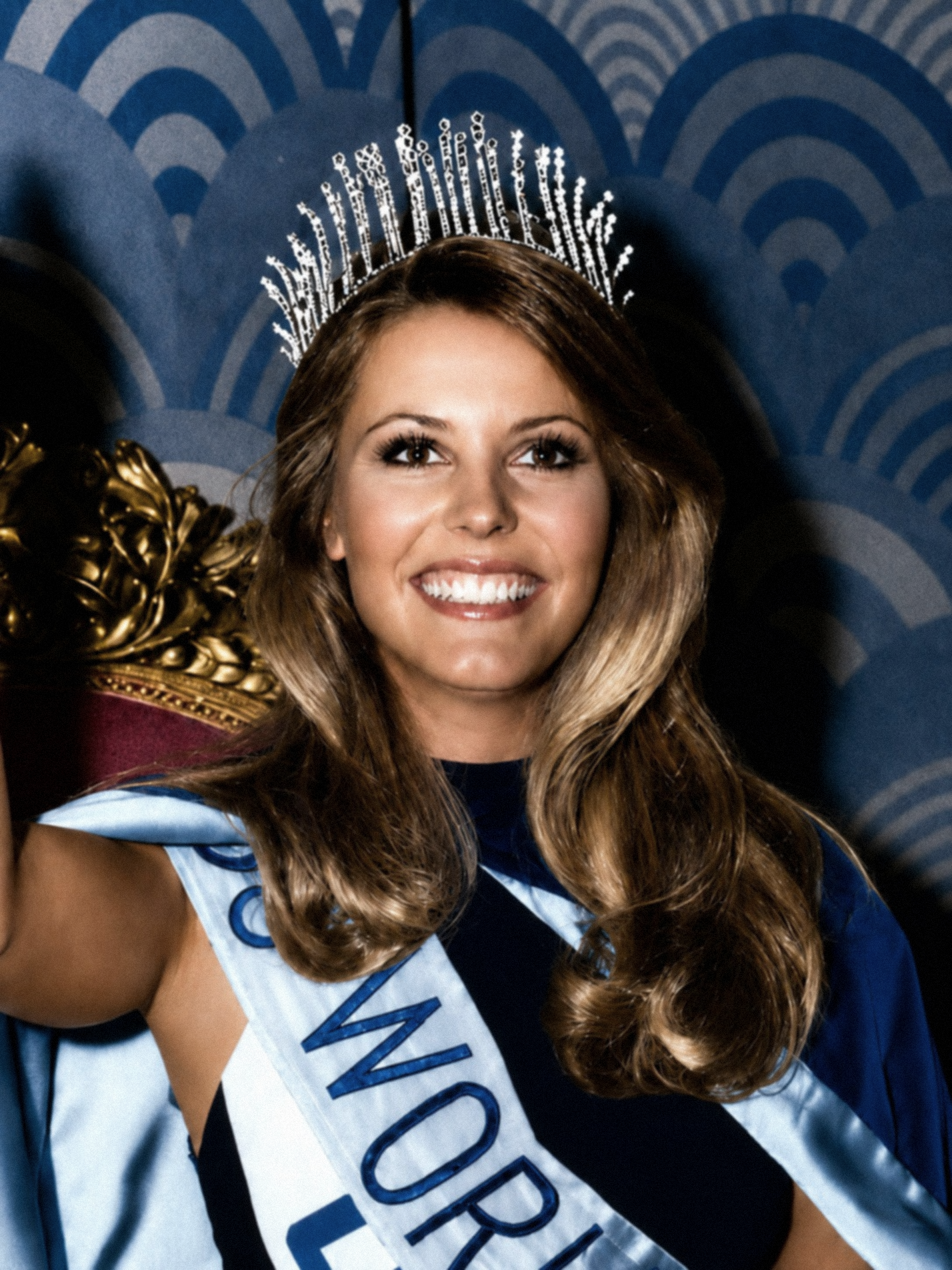
- Wallace in 1973
- Born: January 23, 1954 (age 72); Indianapolis, Indiana, U.S.
- Occupations: Actress; television host; model; beauty queen
- Spouses: Michael Klein (m. 1978; div. 1982); Donald Soffer (m. 1994; div. 1996); John Mills (m. 2021; died 2025)
- Partner: Peter Revson (1973–1974; his death)
- Children: 1
- Beauty pageant titleholder
- Title: Miss World 1973
- Major competitions: Miss World 1973 (Dethroned)

Marjorie Wallace (born January 23, 1954) is an American actress, television host, model and beauty queen. In 1973, she made history as the first woman from the United States to be crowned Miss World, but just 104 days later, pageant officials announced she would be the first Miss World to have her title taken from her for having an affair. Years later, she helped launch the television program Entertainment Tonight as an original co-host.

== Early life ==
Wallace was born on January 23, 1954, in Indianapolis, Indiana, where her family ran an industrial supply business and raised her in the suburbs, she told People magazine. With Indianapolis having a population of about 740,000 in 1970, "dancing at the Holiday Inn was the biggest thing in town," she joked.

When she was 14, her parents divorced. At age 17, she moved in with a guitarist in the Indy rock band Pure Funk.

"My mother always says that if I ever have a daughter, I deserve to have one like myself," she said in 1976.

Wallace also began traveling the 180 miles between Indianapolis and Chicago, to work as a model. A modeling agent pushed her to enter the Miss Indiana World and Miss World USA beauty pageants, both of which she won, opening the door to the 1973 Miss World contest in London.

== Win and loss of Miss World title ==
On November 23, 1973, Wallace defeated 53 competitors at the Royal Albert Hall in London as the first American to be crowned Miss World.

During her time in the UK, she dated celebrities including Welsh singer Tom Jones, Northern Irish football star George Best, and American Indianapolis 500 and Formula One driver Peter Revson, with whom she was reportedly engaged to be married. During her engagement to Revson, she carried on an affair with Tom Jones, being seen kissing him on a beach in Barbados. This violated Wallace's Miss World contract, which prompted pageant authorities to take away her title on March 7, 1974, 104 days after she was crowned, and 15 days before Peter Revson died on March 22, 1974. Contest officials announced that Wallace "had failed to fulfill the basic requirements of the job."

== Death of Peter Revson ==
Fifteen days after Wallace was stripped of her crown, Peter Revson was killed in a fiery crash on March 22, 1974, while practicing for the 1974 South African Grand Prix in Johannesburg. He died en route to a hospital and was wearing a gold locket Wallace had given him bearing the engraving, "If not for you ..." Wallace attended Revson's closed-casket funeral at Manhattan's Unitarian Church of All Souls.

== Overdose ==
Less than three months after Revson's death, Wallace was rushed to St. Vincent Indianapolis Hospital after her sister, Nancy, found her unconscious in her apartment, apparently from an overdose of the sleeping pill Doriden. A doctor stated that Wallace was "comatose, and in pretty bad shape." She was put on a dialysis machine to clear her kidneys.

Wallace's mother Alice stated, "She might have felt like she couldn't go on"; however, Wallace herself said two years later, "I was depressed and OD'd on a few too many sleeping pills. I never attempted suicide."

== Television career ==
Wallace won television acting roles on some of the top shows of the 1970s, including Baretta with Robert Blake and Get Christie Love! with Teresa Graves. She also appeared as a panelist on the television game show, Match Game.

By 1976, she moved into the Los Angeles apartment of tennis champion Jimmy Connors. "Marji (sic) and I don't even have to talk to each other if we don't feel like it," Connors reportedly said. "But I feel I have found someone to share the things I like, and that makes it all worthwhile." Connors, Wallace said, was "a fantastic person. A very different person off the court."

The relationship with the tennis star did not last long. After the breakup, Wallace moved to New York where she auditioned for television sportscasting positions with ABC and CBS. She also appeared in television commercials for Ultra Brite toothpaste, Wella products and American Express.

In the summer of 1977 she met film producer Michael Klein at a Beverly Hills party and they were married in May 1978. Klein's father was Eugene V. Klein, owner of the National Football League's San Diego Chargers. They had a son named Adam.

In 1981, she became one of the first co-anchors on the television show, Entertainment Tonight. A few months later, producers decided to make a change, offering her a reporter position on the program, which she declined.

In 1982, her marriage to Klein ended in divorce. Soon after, newspapers reported she was dating Richard Cohen, the estranged husband of Tina Sinatra. In 1994, she married real estate developer Donald Soffer; they divorced in 1996. In 2021 she married John Mills. Both of her last 2 husbands died in 2025.

Awards and achievements
Preceded by Lynda Carter	Miss World USA; 1973	Succeeded by Lexie H. Brockway
Preceded by (Australia) Belinda Green	Miss World; 1973	Succeeded by (United Kingdom) Helen Morgan (Resigned) (South Africa) Anneline Kriel (Assumed)
Preceded by none	Host of Entertainment Tonight with Ron Hendren and Tom Hallick; 1981	Succeeded by Ron Hendren and Dixie Whatley
