= Ebert test =

Test of a voice synthesizer's ability to deliver a joke

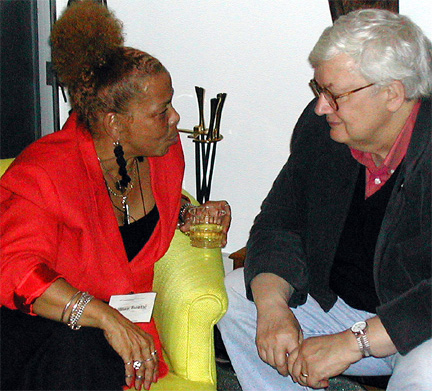
Ebert (right) at the Conference on World Affairs in September 2002, shortly after his cancer diagnosis

The Ebert test gauges whether a computer-based synthesized voice can tell a joke with sufficient skill to cause people to laugh. It was proposed by film critic Roger Ebert at the 2011 TED conference as a challenge to software developers to have a computerized voice master the inflections, delivery, timing, and intonations of human speech. The test is similar to the Turing test proposed by Alan Turing in 1950 as a way to gauge a computer's ability to exhibit intelligent behavior by generating performance indistinguishable from a human being.

If the computer can successfully tell a joke, and do the timing and delivery as well as Henny Youngman, then that's the voice I want.

— Ebert in 2011

Ebert lost his voice in 2006 after undergoing surgery to treat thyroid cancer. He employed a Scottish company called CereProc, which custom-tailors text-to-speech software for voiceless customers who record their voices at length before losing them, and mined tapes and DVD commentaries featuring Ebert to create a voice that sounded more like his own voice. He first publicly used the voice they devised for him in his March 2, 2010, appearance on The Oprah Winfrey Show.

The audience of Ebert's 2011 TED talk about joke delivery by synthesized voices erupted with laughter when a synthesized voice delivered the following joke: "A guy goes into a psychiatrist. The psychiatrist says, 'You’re crazy.' The guy says, 'I want a second opinion.' The psychiatrist says, 'All right, you’re ugly, too.'"
