= At the Movies (1986 TV program) =

Movie review TV program, a.k.a. Siskel & Ebert

- Also known as: Siskel & Ebert & the Movies (1986–1987); Siskel & Ebert (1987–1999); Roger Ebert & the Movies (1999–2000); Ebert & Roeper and the Movies (2000–2001); Ebert & Roeper (2001–2007); At the Movies with Ebert & Roeper (2007–2008)
- Genre: Film review
- Presented by: Gene Siskel; Roger Ebert; Richard Roeper; Ben Lyons; Ben Mankiewicz; Michael Phillips; A. O. Scott
- Country of origin: United States
- Original language: English
- No. of seasons: 24

Production
- Production locations: WBBM-TV, Chicago, Illinois (1986–2001); ABC Building, Chicago, Illinois (2001–2010)
- Running time: 30 minutes
- Production companies: Buena Vista Television (1986–2007); Disney–ABC Domestic Television (2007–10)

Original release
- Network: Syndication
- Release: September 20, 1986 – August 14, 2010

Related
- Sneak Previews; At the Movies (1982); Ebert Presents: At the Movies

At the Movies (produced under several titles during its run, most prominently Siskel & Ebert, and later Ebert & Roeper) is an American movie review television program produced by Disney–ABC Domestic Television from 1986 to 2010 in which two film critics share their opinions of newly released films. Its original hosts were Roger Ebert and Gene Siskel, the former hosts of Sneak Previews on PBS (1975–1982) and a similarly titled syndicated series (1982–1986). After Siskel died in 1999, Ebert worked with various guest critics until choosing Chicago Sun-Times colleague Richard Roeper as his regular partner in 2000.

Ebert suspended his appearances in 2006 for treatment of thyroid cancer, with various guest hosts substituting for him. From April to August 2008 Michael Phillips, a successor of Siskel at the Chicago Tribune, co-hosted with Roeper. Starting on September 6, 2008, Ben Lyons and Ben Mankiewicz took over as hosts; their partnership lasted only one season. On August 5, 2009, it was announced that Phillips would return to the show as a permanent co-host, teaming with A. O. Scott of The New York Times for what would be the program's final season.

During its run with Siskel and Ebert as hosts, the series was nominated for Primetime Emmy Awards seven times and also for Outstanding Information Series, the last nomination occurring in 1997. It was widely known for the "thumbs up/thumbs down" review summaries given during Siskel's and Ebert's tenures (this was dropped after Ebert ended his association with the program, as the phrase "Two Thumbs Up" is a trademark held by the Siskel and Ebert families). The show aired in syndication in the United States and on CTV in Canada; it also aired throughout the week on the cable network ReelzChannel.

The show's cancellation was announced on March 24, 2010, and the last episode was aired during the weekend of August 14–15, 2010. The next month, Ebert announced a new version of At the Movies, which launched on public television on January 21, 2011. The series went on permanent hiatus at the end of 2011 due to lack of financial underwriting and then Ebert's death on April 4, 2013.

== Broadcast history ==
=== Predecessors ===
Ad for At the Movies, which ran from 1982 to 1990

The show's origins and format trace back to Sneak Previews (1975), a PBS series produced by WTTW that originally featured Ebert and Siskel, and At the Movies, a follow-up show that the two created with Tribune Entertainment.

=== Siskel & Ebert & the Movies (1986–1987) ===
The series itself began in September 1986 as Siskel & Ebert & the Movies, when Siskel and Ebert signed with Buena Vista Entertainment, the television division of the Walt Disney Company; it was the division's first ever program.

=== Siskel & Ebert (1987–1999) ===
The show's title was shortened to simply Siskel and Ebert in mid-1987. The program was originally recorded in the studios of WBBM-TV, Chicago's CBS owned-and-operated station. In August 2001, a few years after Disney's 1996 purchase of Capital Cities/ABC, the show's tapings were moved to ABC's Chicago station, WLS-TV, where it remained for its duration.

Siskel and Ebert often had notably divergent tastes, and as a result, heated arguments and spats that added to the series's popularity. Many viewers considered such "fights" the highlight of the program. In joint appearances on the talk show circuit, especially David Letterman's NBC and CBS shows, the two critics indicated a mutual respect and friendship off screen. Widely circulated outtakes from promo-recording sessions show the two both bickering and joking off-air.

On May 11, 1998, Siskel was hospitalized for treatment of a brain tumor. For a few weeks, the show was taped with Siskel on the telephone (from his hospital bed) and Ebert in the studio. Siskel eventually returned to the studio in apparent fine form. In February 1999, he announced he was taking a leave of absence for further treatment of the tumor, hoping to return. Less than three weeks later, Siskel died from complications of the surgery. The weekend after Siskel's death, Ebert devoted the entire half-hour to a tribute to him. On the show were various clips from shows past as well as their history together as journalists and then on television. Ebert also appeared on ABC's Good Morning America in a tribute to Siskel along with Diane Sawyer, Charles Gibson, Peter Jennings, and Joel Siegel, fellow critic and friend of Siskel.

The last show that Siskel and Ebert hosted together aired during the weekend of January 23–24, 1999. On that show, they reviewed At First Sight, Another Day in Paradise, The Hi-Lo Country, Playing by Heart, and The Theory of Flight. Ebert gave thumbs down to all but Another Day in Paradise, while Siskel gave thumbs up to all but Playing by Heart.

=== Roger Ebert & the Movies (1999–2000) ===
On-screen graphic from Roger Ebert & the Movies.

Ebert continued the show with a series of guest critics. Originally retaining the Siskel & Ebert title, the program was renamed Roger Ebert & the Movies on the weekend of September 4–5, 1999, after Siskel's death. The guests matched wits with Ebert and tested their chemistry. Ebert and film director Martin Scorsese co-hosted one noteworthy episode about the best films of the 1990s. This format continued through the end of the 1998–99 season and into 2000 before Ebert named fellow Chicago Sun-Times columnist Richard Roeper as his permanent co-host. Critics Joyce Kulhawik and Michaela Pereira were the other two finalists for the role before the job ultimately went to Roeper.

==== Critics substituting for Gene Siskel after his death ====
The following critics substituted for Siskel after his death:

- David Ansen
- Peter Bogdanovich
- Jeff Greenfield
- Jane Horwitz
- Desson Howe
- Harry Knowles
- Joyce Kulhawik
- Norman Mark
- Janet Maslin
- Todd McCarthy
- Elvis Mitchell
- Joe Morgenstern
- Wesley Morris
- Howie Moshovitz
- Michaela Pereira
- David Poland
- B. Ruby Rich
- Richard Roeper (who became one of the show's hosts from 2000 to 2008)
- Jonathan Rosenbaum
- Leah Rozen
- Lisa Schwarzbaum
- Martin Scorsese (film director)
- Tom Shales
- Joel Siegel (until their "Worst of 1999" show)
- Kenneth Turan
- Jan Wahl
- Michael Wilmington
- Ray Pride
- Dann Gire

=== Ebert & Roeper and the Movies (2000–2001) ===
On-screen graphic from Ebert & Roeper and the Movies.

The addition of Roeper as permanent co-host led to the show's name change on September 9–10, 2000 to Ebert & Roeper and the Movies. The show's name was shortened to Ebert & Roeper in September 2001.

=== Ebert & Roeper (2001–2007) ===
On-screen graphic from Ebert & Roeper.

With the rebranding to Ebert & Roeper in 2001, the series gained a new set, replacing the one that had been used since its 1986 debut.

In 2002, Ebert was diagnosed with thyroid cancer and underwent radiation treatments for tumors on his thyroid and a salivary gland while continuing to work. Complications led to an emergency operation in 2006, which interrupted his reviewing schedule. (A few reviews written or taped in advance were released shortly afterward.) For the remainder of the 2006–07 season, the show continued with guest hosts during his recuperation.

By October 2006, Ebert had recovered sufficiently to resume writing published reviews on a limited basis and later he was able to make a few public appearances, but due to his difficulty speaking, he did not return to the show. As Ebert's doctors attempted to reconstruct his jawbone, his face and neck became increasingly malformed with each surgery. Television being a distinctly visual medium, this put the producers on edge. They worried that Ebert's disfigurement would produce a decline in viewership and lower ratings. The show became available online toward the end of 2006, with access to movie reviews on demand. In June 2007, the online program updated its archive, making available all movie reviews since 1986. After the show's cancellation in 2010, the archive and site were shut down.

=== At the Movies with Ebert & Roeper (2007–2008) ===
Former logo from the show's official web site.

Over the summer of 2007, the show's official name was changed again to At the Movies with Ebert & Roeper, although the show's main title graphics continued to use the shortened name.

As Ebert's absence from the show continued, a handful of critics became frequent guests. Robert Wilonsky of the Dallas Observer and HDnet.com, Chicago Tribune critic Michael Phillips, and A. O. Scott of The New York Times appeared repeatedly. On April 13, 2008, Scott wrote that his "experiences [as guest critic]... ended when Michael Phillips of The Tribune was made Mr. Roeper's permanent foil". Phillips remained Roeper's cohost until Roeper and Ebert ended their relationship with the series in August 2008. The pair's final appearance together occurred in an episode of Entourage that aired on September 6, 2008 (during the weekend the new version of At the Movies debuted), in which they played themselves using their show (filmed on the old sets) to lambast the fictional film Medellin.

The iconic balcony sets, which existed for decades, were dismantled and destroyed. Ebert had been under the impression that they would be donated to the Smithsonian.

==== Critics substituting for Roger Ebert, post-surgery ====
The following critics acted as substitutes for Ebert after his surgery:

- David Edelstein
- Stephen Hunter
- Dave Karger
- Zorianna Kit
- Christy Lemire
- Jay Leno
- John Mellencamp
- Kim Morgan
- Wesley Morris
- Govindini Murty
- George Pennacchio
- Michael Phillips
- Harold Ramis
- John Ridley
- Peter Sagal
- Lisa Schwarzbaum
- A. O. Scott
- Toni Senecal
- Brad Silberling
- Kevin Smith
- Anne Thompson
- Katherine Tulich
- Aisha Tyler
- Mario Van Peebles
- Fred Willard
- Robert Wilonsky

=== At the Movies (2008–2010) ===
==== Lyons and Mankiewicz (2008–2009) ====
On July 21, 2008, Roeper announced that he was leaving the show after he and Disney–ABC Domestic Television did not reach an agreement on a new contract. His last show aired on the weekend of August 16. The same day, Ebert announced on his website that Disney had "decided to take the program... in a new direction" and that he would therefore no longer be associated with the show. Both Ebert and Roeper hinted at returning for a new show that would continue the format Ebert and Siskel devised. The next day, Disney announced that Ben Lyons (whose father, Jeffrey Lyons succeeded Ebert and Siskel on Sneak Previews) and Ben Mankiewicz would take over as the new hosts of At the Movies beginning on September 6–7, 2008. The intention was that Lyons and Mankiewicz would take the show in a new direction, hoping to widen the viewership and appeal to younger audiences. The show generally maintained the same format, with one of the two critics presenting a film, leading to a discussion of its merits.

The "See It/Skip It/Rent It" review thumbnails, the DVD recommendations, and the "3 to See" segment were retained. For some films, the show used a new "Critics Roundup" segment (see below). In addition, instead of the traditional "The balcony is closed" sign-off, one of the hosts said, "We'll be at the movies," which echoed the "We'll see you at the movies" sign-off from the first seven seasons of Sneak Previews and the Tribune Entertainment-produced At the Movies. The show also featured a new upbeat theme arrangement and brighter color scheme. An attempt to enliven film clips during reviews by filling clip letterboxes with coloring was discontinued after the first two episodes due to viewer complaints.

During Lyons's tenure on At the Movies, he was criticized for his perceived lack of understanding of films and film history and use of positively phrased quotes (sound bites) that appeared tailored for use in ads (and increasing his media profile), and for conflicts of interest in posing for photographs with actors whose movies he later reviewed. Without mentioning Ben Lyons by name, Ebert wrote a general commentary on ethical standards for film critics that other commentators interpreted as critical of Lyons and responding to comparisons of Ebert and Lyons. Ebert later acknowledged that Lyons was the subject of the commentary.

During the first two months of Lyons & Mankiewicz's first and only season, ratings for the show slumped 23% to 1.7 total million viewers, compared with same period during Roeper's final season as host, according to figures from Nielsen Media Research, with the program off 25% among the crucial category of adults 25 to 34 (from a 0.8 rating to a 0.6).

==== Scott and Phillips (2009–2010) ====
On August 5, 2009, ABC announced that Lyons and Mankiewicz had been dropped from the series due to low ratings, with A. O. Scott and Michael Phillips returning to the series as the program's new permanent critics. After rerunning the "Two Bens'" final programs for two weeks, the first program with Scott and Phillips premiered on September 5–6, 2009. The program returned to most of its former structure in the Ebert & Roeper era (reviews, the DVD roundup, and "Three to See"), and the "Critics Roundup" segment was fully discontinued. The recap segment moved to within the closing credits sequence; the "we'll be at the movies" sign-off remained. The theme music was changed to resemble to the Ebert & Roeper theme more (originally, this theme was used after Siskel died, during the period when Ebert was using different co-hosts).

==== Cancellation and replacement ====
On March 24, 2010, Disney announced that At the Movies was being canceled, ending 24 seasons of national syndication on August 14–15, 2010. The final episode included reviews of Eat Pray Love, Scott Pilgrim vs. the World, and The Expendables.

The same day the cancellation was announced, Ebert announced he was "deeply involved" in talks to produce a new film review program called Ebert Presents: At the Movies, which would make use of the "Thumbs Up/Thumbs Down" formula he and Siskel introduced. WTTW in Chicago, where Siskel and Ebert had their start, picked up the show, and began to nationally syndicate it on public television on January 21, 2011. The show also aired worldwide on the Armed Forces Network. Its principal co-hosts were originally announced as Christy Lemire of the Associated Press and Elvis Mitchell of National Public Radio. Mitchell was dropped before the new series entered regular production; his replacement was Ignatiy Vishnevetsky of Mubi and the Chicago Reader. Also, Ebert announced that regular contributors and occasional co-hosts would be Kim Morgan and Omar Moore, both respected and popular film bloggers. Ebert himself hosted a segment called "Roger's Office", in which he used a computer voice or guest narrator to review movies or to talk about the industry; he did not debate the hosts or use the "Thumbs Up/Thumbs Down" method himself for the same film in the same episode as Lemire and Vishnevetsky: "They'll be awarding the Thumbs, and you can't have three Thumbs." As it became more common for Ebert to give solo reviews for films that did not screen in time for the main critics to discuss, he started ending his positive reviews with a thumbs-up. For a time, negative Ebert reviews still received no thumb but later began receiving a thumbs-down. The last show of that program aired on December 30, 2011.

== Review style ==
The hosts reviewed a number of recently released and soon-to-be-released movies per episode, taking turns providing a narrative critique interspersed with studio-supplied clips, moving into a back-and-forth debate over the merits. Siskel and Ebert were especially known for sharp criticism that veered close to personally attacking each other, although they insisted this was largely a television act rather than a feud.

The show also recommended films coming on the home video market, including comments on DVD special features.

Reviews from the week's show were posted on the website, atthemoviestv.com, usually on the Tuesday following the show's airing. The site's archives had reviews as far back as the latter half of the 1980s. However, only the reviews for theatrical movies got posted on the web site; the weekly DVD feature and "3 to See" segments did not.

== Review trademarks ==
=== Thumbs Up/Thumbs Down ===
Since 1981 (as a test run, used permanently since the Tribune At The Movies incarnation in 1982), show reviewers would approve/disapprove the films they reviewed with a "thumbs up" or "thumbs down" as a bottom-line recommendation on whether to see a reviewed movie or not. This system departed from the longstanding tradition of ratings with a number of stars or other symbols. As the show became more influential, studios would proudly advertise when their movie got "two thumbs up". In response, the phrase was trademarked in 1995 to ensure against fraudulent use that would endanger its credibility. The critics frequently qualify their recommendations (e.g., "a mild thumbs up" or "two thumbs way down") in their remarks, but the official rating remains simply positive or negative. Prior to their 1982 move to Tribune, the critics approved/disapproved the films they reviewed with a yes/no verdict.

Following the death of Gene Siskel, Disney considered not permitting guest critics to use the "thumb" rating in their movie review. However, this was quickly rescinded, enabling the show to continue with its signature (a picture of the guest critic's own hand giving a "thumbs up" or "thumbs down" was used in the show's graphics presenting his or her review).

On August 20, 2007, Disney pulled the thumbs system from the program during contractual negotiations with Ebert over his involvement with the program. Disney stated that Ebert forced the program to do so. In a statement to Poynter Online, Ebert said that Disney ordered the thumbs removed from the show. He says he had not expected this after an association of over 22 years: "I had made it clear the THUMBS could remain during good-faith negotiations."

Upon being informed in mid-2009 of the most recent change in co-hosts to Scott and Phillips, Ebert indicated to Phillips that he would be prepared to return his endorsement and the "Thumbs" system to the series. However, Disney turned down the offer, saying that the show had "moved on".

=== See It/Skip It/Rent It ===
On the show airing the weekend of May 24, 2008, the hosts began using the terms "See It" [green] and "Skip It" [red] (which appeared in on-screen graphics) when summarizing their reviews. "Rent It" [yellow] has been used to indicate a weakly positive verdict, suggesting that the viewer wait until the movie is available on home video.

=== Wagging Finger of Shame ===
From 2005 to 2006, the show experimented with a "Wagging Finger of Shame" feature, denoting films that were not made available for a standard advance screening and therefore could not be given either a "thumbs up" or "thumbs down". Failure to prescreen a film for reviewers is generally considered an indicator of low confidence by the distributor, apparently believing that negative reviews would harm opening-weekend box office sales. Films so spotlighted included The Amityville Horror, The Fog, In the Mix, Æon Flux, Underworld: Evolution, and Date Movie. This public rebuke was discontinued when Ebert decided the studios were not taking it seriously. Roeper asserted that too many films (eleven in 2006 by April, compared to two by that date in 2005) were being withheld from critics.

=== 3 to See ===
Introduced during the Roeper/Phillips era in 2008, "3 to See" was a segment appearing at the end of each show, in which the reviewers listed their top three favorites of the movies currently in theaters.

=== Critics Roundup ===
Introduced during the Lyons/Mankiewicz era in 2008, "Critics Roundup" was a variation of the traditional format in which one of the hosts presented a film, reviewed it, and then spoke with three other critics who appeared via satellite. Each critic provided their own See It/Skip It/Rent It rating, as did the other host, leading to a panel discussion. The votes of the whole panel were then tallied to provide the show's recommendation. Guest critics on the September 6, 2008, debut of the segment included Wesley Morris of The Boston Globe, Tory Shulman of ReelzChannel, and Matt Singer of IFC.

=== Over/Under ===
Introduced during the Phillips/Scott era in 2010, The "Over/Under" was a segment where the reviewers pick films of a certain genre that they think are overrated and underrated.

== Special programming ==
Occasionally, special shows were produced that focus on particular aspects of film or home video. The show gives the hosts a convenient soapbox to feature their opinions on such issues as film colorization, letterboxing, the MPAA film rating system, product placement, independent filmmaking, and social issues. For instance, one episode, called "Hail, Hail Black and White", was shot in black and white with the pair in tuxedos as part of their focus on the virtues of black and white film. Regular episodes sometimes devoted a few minutes for the hosts to give their opinions of a current issue related to the motion picture industry or to pay tribute to something. Another recurring feature was their "Memo To The Academy" episode, where they offered award nominee recommendations to the Academy of Motion Picture Arts and Sciences.

At the end of every year, the two hosts would run down their choices of the top ten best films from that year, followed the week later by their rundown of their choices of the top ten worst films from that year. Another year-end tradition was Siskel & Ebert's Holiday Video Gift Guide, a special episode where the hosts spotlighted, tried out, and recommended various gifts, toys, and movies for the Christmas season. These aired as an hour-long special from 1987 to 1992, with the final installment in 1993 running for a half hour.

=== Best films of the year ===
From 1986 to 2009, the show compiled "best of the year" film lists which helped to provide an overview of the critics' critical preferences. Their top choices were:

==== Siskel & Ebert (1986–1998) ====
| Year | Siskel | Ebert |
|---|---|---|
| 1986 | Hannah and Her Sisters | Platoon |
| 1987 | The Last Emperor | House of Games |
| 1988 | The Last Temptation of Christ | Mississippi Burning |
| 1989 | Do the Right Thing | |
| 1990 | Goodfellas | |
| 1991 | Hearts of Darkness | JFK |
| 1992 | One False Move | Malcolm X |
| 1993 | Schindler's List | |
| 1994 | Hoop Dreams | |
| 1995 | Crumb | Leaving Las Vegas |
| 1996 | Fargo | |
| 1997 | The Ice Storm | Eve's Bayou |
| 1998 | Babe: Pig in the City | Dark City |

==== Ebert & Maslin (1999) ====
| Year | Ebert | Maslin |
|---|---|---|
| 1999 | Being John Malkovich | Topsy-Turvy |

==== Ebert & Roeper (2000–2005) ====
| Year | Ebert | Roeper |
|---|---|---|
| 2000 | Almost Famous | Crouching Tiger, Hidden Dragon |
| 2001 | Monster's Ball | Memento |
| 2002 | Minority Report | Gangs of New York |
| 2003 | Monster | In America |
| 2004 | Million Dollar Baby | Hotel Rwanda |
| 2005 | Crash | Syriana |

==== Roeper & Scott (2006–2007) ====
| Year | Roeper | Scott |
|---|---|---|
| 2006 | The Departed | Letters from Iwo Jima |
| 2007 | Michael Clayton | 4 Months, 3 Weeks, and 2 Days |

==== Lyons & Mankiewicz (2008) ====
| Year | Lyons | Mankiewicz |
|---|---|---|
| 2008 | The Curious Case of Benjamin Button | The Wrestler |

==== Phillips & Scott (2009) ====
| Year | Phillips | Scott |
|---|---|---|
| 2009 | Up | Where the Wild Things Are |

=== Best films of the decade ===
From the 1980s to the 2000s, the show complied "best of the decade" movie lists, thereby helping provide and overview of the critics' critical preferences. Only three films for this listing were named by the critics as the best film of the year, Raging Bull (1980) for Gene Siskel in the 1980s, Hoop Dreams (1994) for Roger Ebert in the 1990s, and Wall-E (2008) for A.O. Scott in the 2000s.

==== Siskel & Ebert (1980s) ====
| Year | Siskel | Ebert |
|---|---|---|
| 1980s | Raging Bull | |

==== Ebert & Scorsese (1990s) ====
| Year | Ebert | Scorsese |
|---|---|---|
| 1990s | Hoop Dreams | The Horse Thief |

==== Phillips & Scott (2000s) ====
| Year | Phillips | Scott |
|---|---|---|
| 2000s | There Will Be Blood | Wall-E |

== Accolades ==
| Year | Award | Result |
|---|---|---|
| 1987 | Primetime Emmy Award for Outstanding Informational Series | Nominated |
| 1988 | Primetime Emmy Award for Outstanding Informational Series | Nominated |
| 1989 | Daytime Emmy Award for Outstanding Special Class Series | Nominated |
| 1990 | Daytime Emmy Award for Outstanding Special Class Series | Nominated |
| 1991 | Daytime Emmy Award for Outstanding Special Class Series | Nominated |
| 1992 | Primetime Emmy Award for Outstanding Informational Series | Nominated |
| 1994 | Primetime Emmy Award for Outstanding Informational Series | Nominated |
| 1997 | Primetime Emmy Award for Outstanding Informational Series | Nominated |
| 1997 | OFTA Television Award for Best Informational Series | Won |
| 1998 | OFTA Television Award for Best Informational Series | Won |
| 1999 | OFTA Television Award for Best Informational Series | Nominated |
| 2000 | OFTA Television Award for Best Informational Series | Nominated |
| 2004 | OFTA Television Award for Best Informational Series | Nominated |
