= Higman =

Higman is a surname. Notable people with the surname include:

- Barry W. Higman (1943), Australian historian
- Donald G. Higman (1928–2006), American mathematician
- Graham Higman (1917–2008), British mathematician
- Howard Higman (1915–1995), American sociologist
- John Philips Higman (1793–1955), English mathematician and Anglican rector
