= Christy Lemire =

American journalist

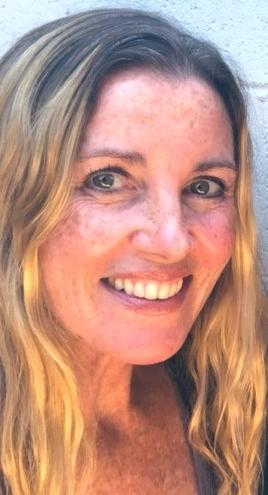
- Lemire in 2019
- Born: Christy A. Nemetz; August 30, 1972 (age 54); Los Angeles, California, U.S.
- Education: Southern Methodist University
- Occupation: Film critic
- Years active: 1999–present
- Spouse: Chris Lemire
- Children: 1
- Website: www.christylemire.com

Christy A. Lemire (née Nemetz; born August 30, 1972) is an American film critic and host of the movie review podcast Breakfast All Day. She previously wrote for the Associated Press from 1999 to 2013, was a co-host of Ebert Presents at the Movies in 2011 and co-hosted the weekly online movie review show What The Flick?! until 2018. As of 2024, she reviews under the Breakfast All Day brand, on YouTube and Patreon, with Alonso Duralde.

== Early life and education ==
Born at the old Cedars of Lebanon Hospital (now Church of Scientology West Coast headquarters), Lemire grew up in Woodland Hills. She is a 1993 graduate of Southern Methodist University with a degree in journalism and is a member of the Delta Gamma sorority.

== Career ==
Lemire started writing film reviews for the Associated Press in 1999 and moved to New York in 2000 as a general entertainment reporter. In 2004, she became the Associated Press' first full-time film critic. She continued into that role until May 2013. In addition to her print work, Lemire has appeared on television shows including the Today Show and Good Morning America.

In 2003, she was a guest co-host on The View. Lemire made headlines when she and co-host Meredith Vieira shared a kiss in response to the Madonna and Britney Spears kiss at the MTV Video Music Awards.

Lemire was ranked number 93 on the "Independent Critics List of the 100 Most Beautiful Faces of 2008".

Lemire made several appearances substituting for film critic Roger Ebert on At the Movies. When Ebert created his new film review program for public television, Ebert Presents: At The Movies, Lemire was selected as co-host of the program along with film critic Ignatiy Vishnevetsky. Ebert Presents: at the Movies aired for a single season in 2011. From 2013 to 2026, Lemire was a contributor to RogerEbert.com.

She was one of the regular critics on the YouTube show What The Flick?! hosted on The Young Turks network, from 2010 to 2018. In August 2018, The Young Turks network canceled What The Flick?! along with Pop Trigger and Nerd Alert to focus on news content. Lemire and co-host Alonso Duralde, former hosts Ben Mankiewicz and Matt Atchity continued the series as a podcast on Lemire's personal website under the new name, Breakfast All Day.

== Preferences ==
=== Best films of the year ===
- 2010: The Social Network
- 2011: Martha Marcy May Marlene
- 2012: Argo
- 2013: Gravity
- 2014: Birdman
- 2015: Mad Max: Fury Road
- 2016: La La Land
- 2017: Call Me by Your Name
- 2018: The Favourite
- 2019: Parasite
- 2020: American Utopia
- 2021: Licorice Pizza
- 2022: The Banshees of Inisherin
- 2023: Poor Things
- 2024: Anora

== Personal life ==
She lives in Palos Verdes Estates, California with her husband Chris Lemire, a television producer, and son Nicolas, born in November 2009. She has described herself as a "lapsed Catholic".

In March 2025, Lemire announced on the Breakfast All Day YouTube channel that she had breast cancer. She subsequently underwent a lumpectomy and announced in May 2025 that she was cancer-free.

== Filmography ==
Year	Title	Role	Notes
2004	Charlie Rose	Guest	1 episode
2005	The Young Turks	Herself	
2007	At the Movies	Guest Host	3 episodes
2010–2011	Ebert Presents: At the Movies	Host	51 episodes
2010–2017	What the Flick?!	Host	154 episodes
2011	50 Documentaries to See Before You Die	Herself	5 episodes
2013	Roger Ebert's 14th Annual Film Festival: A Retrospective	Herself	Short film
2013	Fox News	Herself	Episode: "Studio 11 All Things Oscars 2013"
2013	Good Day L.A.	Herself	2 episodes
2017	Movie Trivia Schmoedown	Herself	Episode: "Rotten Tomatoes Vs What the Flick"
2019	Front Row Flynn	Moderator	2 episodes
2019	The Movies	Herself	3 episodes
2022	Jennifer Lopez: Halftime	Herself	
