= Igor Vishnevetsky =

- Игорь Георгиевич Вишневецкий
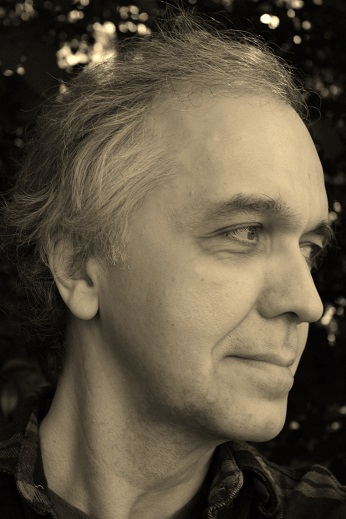
- Born: Igor Georgievich Vishnevetsky; 5 January 1964 (age 62); Rostov-on-Don, USSR
- Education: Moscow State University; Brown University
- Occupations: Poet, novelist, scholar, filmmaker, educator
- Children: Ignatiy Vishnevetsky

Igor Georgievich Vishnevetsky (Russian: Игорь Георгиевич Вишневецкий; born 5 January 1964) is a Russian-born poet, novelist, screenwriter, and editor. He has been a contributor and editor in numerous literary journals, anthologies, and scholarly periodicals since the 1980s. Some of his work has been published in English, including a translated version of his first novel, Leningrad (2010).

== Biography ==
Igor Vishnevetsky was born in Rostov-on-Don in 1964 to Georgiy and Alla Vishnevetsky. Vishnevetsky originally aspired to become a composer. He studied piano performance in school and audited music theory courses at Rostov State Rachmaninoff Conservatory before attending Moscow State University to pursue a degree in philology. After graduating in 1986, Vishnevetsky became an active member of the poetry and art scenes in Moscow and St. Petersburg prior to the break-up of the Soviet Union. In 1988-1992, he worked as a full time teacher of literature in School #57 in Moscow.

Vishnevetsky emigrated to the United States in 1992. Since that time his creative work has been done chiefly in North America.

In 1996 Vishnevetsky received a Ph.D. in Russian Literature from the Department of Slavic Languages of Brown University. Subsequently, he taught at Emory University for five years. In the 2000s, he has also become a notable music historian, and is considered an authority on Sergei Prokofiev and the Russian-American composer Vladimir Dukelsky.

Vishnevetsky also was a visiting professor of Russian and Film at Carnegie Mellon University. During this time, he wrote his experimental novel Leningrad which describes the dehumanizing effects of the Finno-German siege of the city during World War II and deals with transformation of former Russian capital into a Soviet city. Praised for its insights into the minds of the people who experienced the collapse of everything associated with humanity, Leningrad won a 2010 award for the best fiction published in Russia's leading literary periodical Novyi mir. In 2012 it won a prestigious "New Verbal Art (Novaya Slovesnost', or NoS)" literary award.

Since 2010 Vishnevetsky had been working on a film version of Leningrad. The film was completed in 2014 (a slightly shorter version in 2015) and received a number of awards. Film historian and critic Andrei Plakhov called it "an absolutely amazing experiment", while film critic Evgeny Maisel considered Visnevetsky's film "a true challenge to contemporary professional film production." Since 2018 he teaches English and Russian literature at the Franciscan University of Steubenville.

Vishnevetsky is an Eastern Orthodox Christian. His son is film critic Ignatiy Vishnevetsky.

== Bibliography ==
=== Collected poetry ===
- Poems (Stikhotvoreniya). Moscow: ALVA-XXI, 1992. 42 pp.
- Threefold Vision (Troynoe zrenie). New York: Slovo/Word, 1997. 88 pp.
- Air Mail: Poems 1996-2001 (Vozdushnaya pochta: Stikhi 1996–2001). Moscow: Novoe literaturnoe obozrenie, 2001. 96 pp. ISBN 5-86793-148-X
- West of the Sun (Na zapad solntsa). Moscow: Nauka; Russkiy Gulliver, 2006. 278 pp. ISBN 5-02-034198-3
- First Snow (Pervosnezhye). Moscow: Russkiy Gulliver, 2008. 76 pp. ISBN 978-5-91627-009-9
- Rhymologion (Stikhoslov). Moscow: Ikar, 2008. 126 pp. ISBN 978-5-7974-0184-1
- Collected Poems 2002-2020 (Sobranie strikhotvorenii 2002–2020). Moscow: Novoe literaturnoe obozrenie, 2021. 308 pp. ISBN 978-5-4448-1572-4

=== Fiction ===
- Leningrad: povest'. Moscow: Vremya, 2012. 160 pp. ISBN 978-5-9691-0796-0
- Leningrad: A novel. Translated by Andrew Bromfield. Champaign - London - Dublin: Dalkey Archive Press, 2013. 124 pp. ISBN 978-1-56478-902-0
- Leningrad. Translated into Macedonian by Мirjana Naumovski. Skopje: Bata pres, 2014. 154 pp. ISBN 978-608-4654-68-1
- Non-Elective Affinities (Neizbiratelinoe srodstvo[: сollected prose – novels Leningrad (2009), Islands in the Lagoon / Ostrova v lagune (2012), Non-Elective Affinities / Neizbiratelinoe srodstvo (2013-2017), short fiction Poet Who Was Not Forgotten / Nezabytyi poet (2012)]). Moscow: EKSMO, 2018. 384 pp. ISBN 978-5-04-093120-0
- Leningrad. Traduzione a cura di Daniela Rizzi e Luisa Ruvoletto. Venezia: Libreria Editrice Cafoscarina, 2019. 216 pp. ISBN 978-88-7543-465-6
- Le affinità non elettive: romanzo. Anno 1835. Traduzione, postfazione e cura di Iris Karafillidis; prefazione di Stefano Garzonio. Pisa: Pisa University Press, 2023. 216 pp. ISBN 978-88-3339-891-4

=== Academic works (selected) ===
- Tragic Subject in Action: Andrei Bely (Tragicheskiy sub'yekt v deystvii: Andrey Belyi). Frankfurt am Main: Peter Lang, 2000. 214 pp. ISBN 3-631-35238-7
- Sergei Solovyov as a Historian of Philosophy and Culture. In S. M. Solovyov. Vladimir Solovyov: His Life and Creative Evolution. Vol. 1 (Fairfax, Va.: Eastern Christian Publications, 2001): IX-XXII. ISBN 1-892278-05-7
- Andrei Bely and Sergei Solovyov in Dictionary of Literary Biography, vol. 295 (Thomson/Gale, 2004): 63–80, 369–376. ISBN 0-7876-6832-X
- The "Eurasianist Tendency" in the Music of the 1920s and 1930s («Evraziyskoe uklonenie» v muzyke 1920-kh -1930-kh godov). Moscow: Novoe literaturnoe obozrenie, 2005. 512 pp.
- Sergei Prokofiev (Sergey Prokof'ev). Moscow: Molodaya gvardiya, 2009. 704 pp. ISBN 978-5-235-03212-5
- Arseny Tarkovsky in Dictionary of Literary Biography, vol. 359 (Gale, 2011): 265–280. ISBN 978-0-7876-8177-7
- The Literary Fate of Vasiliy Kondrat'ev (Literaturnaya sud'ba Vasiliya Konrdat'eva), Novoe literaturnoe obozrenie, 3/157 (2019): 239-267
- Three Contemporary Russian Poets and Biblical Tradition: Sergey Zavyalov, Natalia Chernykh, Jaan Kaplinski, Religions, 11/13 (2022)

=== Filmography ===
- Leningrad (2015)
