= Ignatiy Vishnevetsky =

U.S.-based Russian film critic, writer and essayist

- Игнатий Вишневецкий
- Born: Ignatiy Igorevich Vishnevetsky; September 5, 1986 (age 39); Moscow, Russian SFSR, Soviet Union
- Citizenship: Russia; United States
- Occupations: Film critic; essayist
- Spouse: Theresa Roberts (m. 2011)
- Children: 2
- Parent: Igor Vishnevetsky (father)
- Writing career
- Subject: Film

Ignatiy Igorevich Vishnevetsky (/ɪɡˈnɑːti ˌvɪʃnəˈvɛtski/; Russian: Игнатий Игоревич Вишневецкий; born September 5, 1986) is a Russian-American film critic, essayist, and columnist. He has worked as a staff film critic for The A.V. Club and written for Mubi.com and the Chicago Reader.

Vishnevetsky co-hosted Roger Ebert Presents: At the Movies, a nationally syndicated film criticism television show, with Christy Lemire.

== Early life and education ==
Vishnevetsky was born in Moscow, the son of Russian poet Igor Vishnevetsky. He has said that his paternal ancestors were Don Cossacks, and he is of Polish descent through his maternal ancestry. He moved to the United States at the age of eight, following his parents' divorce. Although he did not formally study English in school while living in Russia, Vishnevetsky claims that he learned the language "entirely from TV and American TV commercials I watched constantly".

He lived with his father, stepmother, and stepbrother in Decatur, Georgia, and, four years later, relocated to Wauwatosa, Wisconsin, where he graduated from Wauwatosa East High School and then moved to Chicago, where he briefly attended Columbia College Chicago, studying film directing.

== Career ==
Before working as a film critic, Vishnevetsky worked as a translator, movie theater usher, and laundromat attendant. Beginning in 2004, he became involved with Chicago's cinephile community, many of whose members he met through the now-defunct video rental store Odd Obsession. He was involved in a screening space called North Western Avenue, whose participants later co-founded the film website Cine-File.info, to which Vishnevetsky contributed.

In 2006, Vishnevetsky wrote and directed a 45-minute short film; he also served as the film's editor and cinematographer. Soon after a final cut was completed, a hard drive failure destroyed much of the footage. In an interview with the podcast Film in Focus, Vishnevetsky stated that the experience led him to pursue film criticism full-time. Vishnevetsky published a film zine called Zero for Conduct before joining the NYU-based film journal Tisch Film Review and then MUBI.

In the fall of 2010, he was approached by Roger Ebert and his wife, Chaz Ebert, about auditioning for their new television show, Ebert Presents: At the Movies. After several months of auditions, Vishnevetsky was announced as the show's co-host alongside Christy Lemire. Vishnevetsky replaced critic Elvis Mitchell, who had appeared in the show's pilot but left the production for undisclosed reasons.

Vishnevetsky directed a short film, Ellie Lumme, which premiered in 2014.

== Critical style ==
He has described himself as "more of an optimist for the future of cinema than for the future of movies", stating that in his view the two were not synonymous. Comparing Vishnevetsky with his co-host, Christy Lemire, Time writer Steven James Snyder wrote that Lemire was "more preoccupied with finesse and plot points", while Vishnevetsky was "more interested in structure, experimentation and mood".

== Preferences ==
In the February 11, 2011, episode of Ebert Presents At the Movies, Vishnevetsky stated that the greatest influence on his work as a critic was Jean-Luc Godard's video project Histoire(s) du cinéma. In the same episode, he named the silent films True Heart Susie and Foolish Wives; the Holocaust documentary Shoah; and Jacques Tati's Playtime as the movies that made him want to become a film critic. In a blog post presented as an "appendix" to the episode, he revealed that he writes the majority of his film criticism by hand and will sometimes "edit together" essays out of notes and parts of unpublished texts.

Vishnevetsky participated in the 2012 Sight & Sound critics' poll, where he listed ten of his favorite films as follows: Blow Out, Days of Being Wild, Dead or Alive 2: Birds, Hotel America, The Lady from Shanghai, Modern Romance, Mysteries of Lisbon, Red Viburnum, RoboCop, and Some Came Running. Vishnevetsky compiled his list by writing 90 of his favorite titles on scraps of paper and then drawing ten from a bowl.

== Personal life ==
Vishnevetsky has retained his Russian citizenship, and obtained American citizenship in 2017. As of 2011, he lives in Chicago. He married Theresa Roberts, a sculptor and installation artist, in January 2011. They have two children together.

== See also ==
- Vulgar auteurism
