= Ebert Presents: At the Movies =

2011 television series involving film reviews

- Genre: Talk show
- Presented by: Christy Lemire; Ignatiy Vishnevetsky
- Country of origin: United States
- Original language: English
- No. of seasons: 1

Production
- Executive producers: Roger Ebert; Chaz Ebert
- Production locations: WTTW Studios in Chicago, Illinois
- Running time: 30 minutes
- Production company: Ebert Productions

Original release
- Network: Syndication
- Release: January 21 – December 30, 2011

Related
- At the Movies (1982–1986) At the Movies (1986–2010); Sneak Previews

Ebert Presents: At the Movies was a weekly, nationally syndicated movie review television program produced by film critic Roger Ebert and his wife, Chaz Ebert. The program aired on public television stations in the United States through American Public Television from January 21 to December 30, 2011.

The show continued the format originated by Ebert and Gene Siskel on their first show, Sneak Previews, and continued on At the Movies with Gene Siskel and Roger Ebert and At the Movies, in which two film critics discuss the week's new releases. Occasionally, the program aired special theme episodes, such as one listing the hosts' favorite films of 2011.

Ebert Presents: At the Movies was hosted by Christy Lemire of The Associated Press and Ignatiy Vishnevetsky of The Chicago Reader and MUBI. The program premiered on January 21, 2011 but went into permanent hiatus at the end of the year after Ebert reported that the show had difficulties finding new sources of financial underwriting.

== Development ==
A pilot was shot in the summer of 2010 featuring critics Christy Lemire and Elvis Mitchell of National Public Radio. Though it was assumed that the two would co-host the show, in December 2010 it was later announced that Mitchell would not be taking part in the program. Lemire remained as one of the two principal critics, alongside Ignatiy Vishnevetsky.

The show marked Ebert's return to television for the first time since his emergency operation in 2006. Since his surgery cost him the ability to speak, he continued to review movies from his office set, using famed Chicago journalist and anchor Bill Kurtis and others to read his reviews.

== Production ==
Ebert Presents: At the Movies was filmed at the studios of WTTW in Chicago, where Siskel and Ebert's version of the program (originally titled Opening Soon at a Theater Near You) began filming 36 years earlier. Though the show used a newly constructed set made to resemble a balcony, hosts Lemire and Vishnevetsky sat in the seats originally used by Siskel and Ebert on the show Sneak Previews.

The show regularly featured guest contributors such as Kim Morgan, Omar Moore, and producer Chaz Ebert.

== Cancellation ==
On November 6, 2011, Ebert announced in a post on his blog that he and Chaz had paid for the first season themselves and had hoped to find new sources of underwriting for subsequent seasons. He also stated that the program would have to be canceled if that funding could not be arranged.

In a subsequent blog entry posted on November 30, 2011, Ebert stated that the show would go on hiatus at the end of the year, and the last episode aired in late December. No further announcements were made about the show prior to Ebert's death in 2013.
