= Sneak Previews =

American film review television series

- Also known as: Opening Soon at a Theater Near You (1975–1977); Sneak Previews Goes Video (1989–1991)
- Genre: Film review
- Created by: Thea Flaum
- Presented by: Roger Ebert; Gene Siskel; Neal Gabler; Jeffrey Lyons; Michael Medved
- Country of origin: United States
- Original language: English
- No. of seasons: 21

Production
- Production location: Chicago, Illinois
- Running time: 30 minutes
- Production company: WTTW

Original release
- Network: PBS
- Release: November 23, 1975 – October 4, 1996

Related
- At the Movies (1982); At the Movies (1986); Ebert Presents: At the Movies

Sneak Previews (1975 to 1996: known as Opening Soon...at a Theater Near You from 1975 to 1977, and Sneak Previews Goes Video from 1989 to 1991) is an American film review show that ran for over two decades on the Public Broadcasting Service (PBS). It was created by WTTW, a PBS member station in Chicago, Illinois. It premiered on November 23, 1975, as a monthly local-only show called Opening Soon...at a Theater Near You and on October 15, 1977, was renamed Sneak Previews. In 1978 it became a biweekly show airing nationally on PBS. It grew to prominence with a review-conversation-banter format between opinionated film critics, notably for a time, Roger Ebert and Gene Siskel. By 1980, it was a weekly series airing on over 180 stations and the highest-rated weekly entertainment series in the history of public broadcasting. The show's final broadcast was on October 4, 1996.

== Format ==
The show featured two critics who presented short clips of movies in current release and debated their merits, energetically defending their remarks if the other critic disagreed. A designated "dog of the week" was also featured, with "Spot the Wonder Dog" barking on cue as an introduction.

Episodes from the first seven seasons ended with one of the hosts saying "See you at the movies." Many episodes from seasons 8 through 14 and 17 through 21 ended with the hosts' reminder to "save us the aisle seats." Episodes from seasons 18 through 20 (when it was known as Sneak Previews Goes Video) ended with the hosts' reminder, "don't forget to rewind that tape."

Some episodes were known as Take 2 shows, which replaced reviews of recently released films with themed topics such as "Women in Danger", and slasher films of the 1970s and early 1980s. On one occasion, Siskel and Ebert invited the viewer into a day in their lives as they screened films.

== History ==
Title card from Opening Soon at a Theater Near You.

The show first aired in 1975 on a monthly basis under the name Opening Soon at a Theater Near You and, after two successful seasons, was renamed Sneak Previews. The show originally featured Roger Ebert, a film critic for the Chicago Sun-Times, and Gene Siskel, a film critic for the Chicago Tribune.

The two newspapers were competitors, and so were Siskel and Ebert. As Ebert wrote after Siskel's death in 1999:

We both thought of ourselves as full-service, one-stop film critics. We didn't see why the other one was quite necessary. We had been linked in a Faustian television format that brought us success at the price of autonomy. No sooner had I expressed a verdict on a movie, my verdict, than here came Siskel with the arrogance to say I was wrong, or, for that matter, the condescension to agree with me. It really felt like that. It was not an act. When we disagreed, there was incredulity; when we agreed, there was a kind of relief. In the television biz, they talk about "chemistry." Not a thought was given to our chemistry. We just had it, because from the day the Chicago Tribune made Gene its film critic, we were professional enemies. We never had a single meaningful conversation before we started to work on our TV program. Alone together in an elevator, we would study the numbers changing above the door.

The tension between the two men made the show's production difficult and time-consuming at first:

Making this rivalry even worse was the tension of our early tapings. It would take eight hours to get one show in the can, with breaks for lunch, dinner and fights. I would break down, or he would break down, or one of us would do something different and throw the other off, or the accumulating angst would make our exchanges seem simply bizarre. There are many witnesses to the terror of those days. Only when we threw away our clipboards and 3×5 cards did we get anything done; we finally started ad-libbing and the show began to work. We found we could tape a show in under an hour.

Over time the two men became close personal friends while remaining professional rivals, and Ebert said of their relationship before Siskel's death, "no one else could possibly understand how meaningless was the hate, how deep was the love".

=== Post-Siskel and Ebert ===
The show's success led WTTW to syndicate it to commercial television. Siskel and Ebert left Sneak Previews in 1982, citing contractual differences with WTTW. They said they were offered a contract and asked to "take it or leave it", and chose the latter option. The two were soon featured in At the Movies with Gene Siskel and Roger Ebert, a similar show created with Tribune Entertainment and replaced in 1986 by a Disney-produced show first known as Siskel & Ebert & the Movies (adopting the title At the Movies in 2008).

After Siskel and Ebert left the show, more than 300 critics auditioned to become their replacements, among them Pauline Kael. Ebert's future co-host on At the Movies, Richard Roeper, auditioned while still a college student and was turned down.

In 1982, WTTW signed Neal Gabler and Jeffrey Lyons as replacements for Siskel and Ebert on Sneak Previews. Because Siskel and Ebert had trademarked the phrase "Two Thumbs Up", Lyons and Gabler simply gave "yes" or "no" judgments to the movies they reviewed. Each post-1982 episode (with the exception of 1989 to 1991) ended with the catch phrase "Don't forget to save us the aisle seats." Gabler left Sneak Previews in 1985, citing philosophical differences with the direction of the show, and was replaced by Michael Medved. Before replacing Gabler, Medved had cameo appearances on the show, presenting the "Golden Turkey Awards," based on the book, and a variation of Siskel & Ebert's "Spot the Wonder Dog/Dog of the Week."

=== Cancellation ===
Although Sneak Previews continued on PBS for 14 years after Ebert and Siskel left, the program did not maintain the popularity it enjoyed during their tenure. In 1983, Tom Shales of The Washington Post called the two critics hosting at the time (Lyons and Gabler) "two New York yokels...Jeffrey Lyons, to whom the notion of insight or analysis is more foreign than Jupiter, and Neal Gabler, who talks down to viewers as if they were all 3 years old and looks into the camera the way Dracula regards a vacant neck."

The show's title was changed to Sneak Previews Goes Video in 1989, and concentrated on home video releases, but returned to its original title in 1991. PBS continued to broadcast the program until the fall of 1996, when it was canceled due to a lack of underwriting.

== In popular culture ==
From the early-to-mid eighties to the early nineties, Sesame Street had a recurring parody sketch, "Sneak Peek Previews", which illustrated differences of opinion. In a rundown movie theater, Oscar the Grouch and Telly Monster watched a short video segment, usually from the Sesame Street archives. After the video, Oscar invariably disliked it, and Telly enjoyed it, and they each told why. Siskel and Ebert appeared in one sketch in 1991, teaching the hosts how their thumbs up/thumbs down rating system works. At the end of sketch, Oscar asks if there could be a thumbs sideways rating (the film in question was Walt Disney's Cinderella), and goads the two men about whether that would be acceptable. Ebert likes the idea, but Siskel does not.

== Accolades ==
In 1979, the show received a Chicago Emmy Award for Outstanding Special Program.
