= Conference on World Affairs =

Annual week-long conference at University of Colorado Boulder

- Abbreviation: CWA
- Formation: 1948
- Founder: Howard Higman
- Location: Boulder, Colorado
- Parent organization: University of Colorado Boulder
- Website: www.colorado.edu/cwa/

The Conference on World Affairs (CWA) is an annual conference, featuring panel discussions among experts in international affairs and other areas, founded by sociologist Howard Higman and hosted by the University of Colorado Boulder since 1948. Long-running events include Cinema Interruptus, an analysis of a movie with audience, founded and hosted for many years by Roger Ebert, and a jazz concert hosted by Dave and Don Grusin. All events are free and open to the public.

== History ==
The Conference was founded in 1948 by Howard Higman, a professor of sociology at the university. He ran the conference until he retired, shortly before his death in 1995. The Conference resumed in 1996 and was directed for 16 years by Professor James Palmer, currently by John Griffin.

In mid-March 2020, with ever-increasing public health concerns about the COVID-19 pandemic, CWA announced the cancellation of the 72nd conference. It left open the possibility of rescheduling the conference if the situation improved sufficiently, which it did not.

== Content and panelists ==
The conference started out as a forum on international affairs, but under Higman, it expanded into a discussion of eclectic topics. The core of the conference consists of panel discussions, usually with 3–6 panelists, on topics such as music, art, literature, environmental activism, business, science, journalism, diplomacy, technology, spirituality, the film industry, pop culture, visual arts, politics, medicine, and human rights. Half of a panel typically consists of experts on that panel's subject, and half with people having no professional connection to the topic, who offer fresh perspectives and insight. Only a one-line topic for the panel is announced two or three weeks before the conference. The panelists are given no other direction or guidance about what they should say.

Each year the conference hosts over 100 panelists, and conducts over 200 sessions. All sessions are free and open to the public and are held in rooms varying in capacity according to anticipated popularity, from 50 seats to 2000. The total annual attendance of all the events at the 62nd Conference on World Affairs (in April 2010) was estimated to be over 92,000. Numerous distinguished people have served as panelists over the years, including Patch Adams, Margot Adler, Betty Dodson, Buckminster Fuller, Temple Grandin, Werner Herzog, Adam Hochschild, Arianna Huffington, Andy Ihnatko, Molly Ivins, Henry Kissinger, Charles Krauthammer, Paul Krugman, George McGovern, William Nack, Ralph Nader, Howard Nemerov, Yitzhak Rabin, Eleanor Roosevelt, Seth Shostak, Julia Sweeney, Studs Terkel, and Ted Turner.

The CWA is governed by a board selected by both community volunteers and by the university administration, and includes volunteers, faculty members, and students. .

== Cinema Interruptus ==
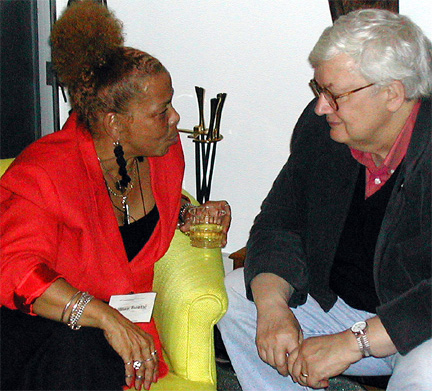
Roger Ebert (right) with Lillian Boutté at the Conference on World Affairs in September 2002

A long-running event is Cinema Interruptus, hosted for many years by film critic Roger Ebert. Ebert selected a movie and showed it at the beginning of the week, in a normal, uninterrupted way. Then, over the following four afternoons, the movie was analyzed a shot at a time. Ebert, or anybody else in the audience, could pause the movie to point out anything they found interesting.

In 2008, Ebert wrote of the program's beginnings:

This all began for me in about 1969, when I started teaching a film class in the University of Chicago's Fine Arts program. I knew a Chicago film critic, teacher and booker named John West, who lived in a wondrous apartment filled with film prints, projectors, books, posters and stills. "You know how football coaches use a stop-action 16 mm projector to study game films?" he asked me. "You can use that approach to study films. Just pause the film and think about what you see. You ought to try it with your film class."

I did. The results were beyond my imagination. I wasn't the teacher and my students weren't the audience, we were all in this together. The ground rules: Anybody could call out "stop!" and discuss what we were looking at, or whatever had just occurred to them. A couple of years later, when I started doing shot-by-shots at the Conference on World Affairs at the University of Colorado Boulder, the conference founder, Howard Higman, described this process as "democracy in the dark". Later he gave it a name: Cinema Interruptus. Perhaps it sounds grueling, but in fact it can be exciting and almost hypnotic. At Boulder for more than 30 years, I made my way through a film for two hours every afternoon for a week, and the sessions had to be moved to an auditorium to accommodate attendance that approached a thousand.

In The Third Man, if a character spoke German, there would be a German speaker. If a scene required medical knowledge, there would be a doctor. A Japanese film at Boulder turned up Japanese speakers, experts on the society, students of the director. There would be somebody who could tell you what a Ford truck could and couldn't do. Or a rabbi, a physicist, an artist, a musician. When Criterion asked me to record a commentary track on Ozu's Floating Weeds, I reflected that I didn't know a fraction of what Donald Richie or David Bordwell knew about Ozu (and Richie was already doing the film's silent version). How to talk for two hours about the visuals of a film where every scene is a single static shot? I took the film to Boulder, and together we discovered there was a rich abundance of things to say.

While Ebert was recovering from cancer surgeries in 2007 and 2008, RogerEbert.com founding editor and CWA participant Jim Emerson stepped in to moderate during his absence. In 2009, after cancer robbed him of his ability to speak, Ebert invited Ramin Bahrani to go through his Chop Shop using the Interruptus method: "The smallest details of the film reflected the vision of Bahrani and his cinematographer, Michael Simmonds. He explained why each shot was chosen. How each was choreographed. How the plot, which seems to unfold in a documentary fashion, has a three-act structure, a character arc, and deliberate turning points. Why there was a soccer sticker on the back of a pickup truck." Ebert used his computerized voice to participate.

Bahrani told Ebert he'd do anything to meet Werner Herzog, so they "conspired to lure Werner to Boulder in 2010, where he joined Ramin in a shot-by-shot analysis of Aguirre, the Wrath of God...Although I couldn't speak, it was an inspiring experience for me, bringing these two men together in the act of watching a great film... I was deeply satisfied every afternoon by the Interruptus sessions, and at some point that week I realized it would be my last trip to Boulder. I had come the first time forty years earlier. As I watched a great director whose career I'd admired from 1968, and another who had emerged in the last few years, I thought that was symbolism enough. I gave Interruptus a push and knew it could sail on its own. I felt good that Herzog had been in my life close to the beginning and now probably close to the end and had never made an unworthy film. I don't think Bahrani will make one, either. Artists like them bring meaning to my life, which has been devoted in such large part to films of worthlessness."

In 2011, Ebert announced that he would not be returning, and Emerson would carry on as moderator.

After Ebert's passing in 2013, the event was named Ebert Interruptus. In 2016, the critic and Filmspotting host Josh Larsen made his Interruptus debut with Rushmore. Larsen is the Interruptus host as of this writing.

Interruptus films

- 1975 Citizen Kane
- 1976 Notorious
- 1977 The Third Man
- 1978 8½
- 1979 La Dolce Vita Ebert announced a plan to analyze Fellini's film at the conference every ten years or so.
- 1980 Amarcord
- 1981 Cries and Whispers
- 1982 Taxi Driver
- 1983 La Dolce Vita
- 1984 Ebert showed six films: God's Angry Man, Huie's Sermon, The Bitter Tears of Petra Van Kant, My Dinner With Andre, Gates of Heaven and Werner Herzog Eats His Shoe
- 1985 Casablanca
- 1986 The Treasure of the Sierra Madre
- 1987 3 Women
- 1988 The Third Man
- 1989 Out of the Past
- 1990 Raging Bull
- 1991 Citizen Kane
- 1992 The Silence of the Lambs
- 1993 JFK
- 1994 La Dolce Vita
- 1995 There was no CWA this year
- 1996 Pulp Fiction
- 1997 Fargo
- 1998 Dark City
- 1999 Vertigo
- 2000 Casablanca
- 2001 Fight Club
- 2002 Mulholland Drive
- 2003 Floating Weeds, in addition to Tokyo-Ga, a documentary by Wim Wenders about Yasujirō Ozu
- 2004 La Regle de Jeu
- 2005 La Dolce Vita
- 2006 The Long Goodbye
- 2007 Chinatown Jim Emerson filled in while Ebert recovered from surgery
- 2008 No Country For Old Men Emerson again filled in for Ebert
- 2009 Chop Shop Ebert and Emerson were joined by the film's director, Ramin Bahrani
- 2010 Aguirre, the Wrath of God Ebert, Emerson and Bahrani were joined by the film's director, Werner Herzog. This was Ebert's last year at the Conference.
- 2011 A Serious Man Emerson resumed his role as moderator
- 2012 Tinker Tailor Soldier Spy
- 2013 One Flew Over the Cuckoo's Nest hosted by the playwright and screenwriter Terrence McNally
- 2014 The Graduate hosted by David Bender
- 2015 A Face in the Crowd hosted by Bender
- 2016 Sunrise: A Song of Two Humans hosted by Howie Movshovitz
- 2017 Rushmore hosted by Josh Larsen
- 2018 Mad Max: Fury Road hosted by Larsen
- 2019 WALL-E hosted by Larsen. Larsen also showed Charlie Chaplin's short The Rink and clips from Hello, Dolly! and 2001: A Space Odyssey
- 2020 No conference due to the COVID-19 pandemic
- 2021 Lover's Rock, hosted virtually by Larsen
- 2022 Jaws, hosted in person by Larsen, with guest speaker Walter Chaw. Larsen showed clips from Creature From the Black Lagoon and The Spirit of Saint Louis
- 2023 Honeyland
- 2024 The Babadook Larsen showed clips from Lotte Reiniger's The Adventures of Prince Achmed and Segundo de Chomón's La maison ensorcelée, cited as influences by Jennifer Kent, and Kent's short film Monster (2005)
- 2025 The Wizard of Oz

== Jazz concert ==
One of the signature events is a free jazz concert featuring performers from around the world. Past performers have included vocalist Cyrille Aimée, bassist Bijoux Barbosa, pianist Henry Butler, trumpeter and multi-instrumentalist Brad Goode and saxophonist Ernie Watts.

In his memoir Life Itself, Ebert concludes his chapter on the conference with a description of the 2009 concert:

Every year there is a jazz concert featuring world-class professional musician, performing for free, convened by the Grusin brothers, Dave and Don. I have heard a set of bongo drums played by Rony Barrak more rapidly and with more precision than I have ever heard before. I heard the flautist Nestor Torres playing Bach with all his heart and then segueing into Latin jazz with songs he composed especially for the conference. During one song, the charismatic jazz vocalist Lillian Boutté, from Germany out of New Orleans, was so happy that people started dancing in the aisles. People, from my knowledge, from sixteen to eighty...They were feeling elevation. They weren't smiling. They were grinning like kids. On the stage, the musicians were grinning, too. There was a happiness storm in old Macky Auditorium. After all their paid gigs in studio recording sessions, how often do fourteen gifted improvisational jazz and Latin artists get together to jam together just for fun? All free, all open to the public.

In the past, there have been master classes and jam sessions featuring musicians visiting the CWA for the jazz concert and students in the University's Thompson Jazz Studies Program.

The 2021 CWA Jazz Concert was hosted virtually and can be viewed on YouTube.
