= Chaz Ebert =

American businesswoman (born 1952)

- Ebert in 2026
- Born: Charlie Hammel; October 15, 1952 (age 74); Chicago, Illinois, U.S.
- Education: University of Dubuque (BA); University of Wisconsin–Platteville (MA); DePaul University (JD)
- Occupations: Businessperson; attorney
- Years active: 1972-present
- Spouse(s): Merle Smith (divorced) Roger Ebert (m. 1992; died 2013)
- Children: 2

Chaz Ebert (née Hammel, previously Hammel-Smith, born October 15, 1952) is an American businesswoman and former lawyer. She is best known for her marriage to film critic Roger Ebert, having been married to him from 1992 until his death in 2013.

== Early life ==
Ebert was born Charlie Hammel in Chicago, Illinois, to Johnnie Hobbs Hammel and Wiley Hammel Sr. She attended Crane Technical High School in Chicago. She earned a Bachelor of Arts degree from the University of Dubuque, a Master of Arts from University of Wisconsin–Platteville, and a Juris Doctor from the DePaul University College of Law.

== Career ==
Ebert was an executive producer and guest on Ebert Presents: At the Movies. She is the CEO and publisher of Ebert Digital, which publishes RogerEbert.com, a website that contains an archive of her deceased husband Roger Ebert's film reviews and publishes contributors' film reviews. She was featured in the 2014 documentary Life Itself about Roger Ebert and was an executive producer of the 2019 film Selah and the Spades.

In 2005, Ebert was part of a group of high-profile minority and female shareholders who filed a federal lawsuit against other investors in the bankrupt Rosemont, Illinois-based Emerald Casino. Ebert and the other investors said they lost more than $21 million after the Illinois Gaming Board revoked the license from the Emerald Casino, reportedly because the other investors were accused of lying to state regulators or having ties to organized crime.

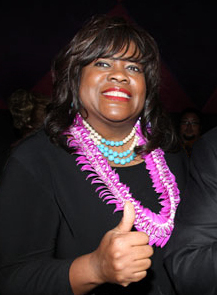
Ebert in 2010

After the death of her husband in 2013 and until 2026, Ebert became the host of Ebertfest, an annual film festival held in Champaign, Illinois, in collaboration with the UIUC College of Media.

On September 28, 2022, during the 2022 Screen Gems Benefit, Ebert announced that she would make her directorial debut on a documentary about Deborah Szekely, the centenarian so-called godmother of health and fitness. The film, entitled The Wellness Warrior, premiered on October 26, 2024, at the Chicago International Film Festival.

On May 7, 2024, Ebert published a book entitled It's Time to Give a FECK: Elevating Humanity through Forgiveness, Empathy, Compassion, and Kindness, about the importance of forgiveness, empathy, compassion, and kindness, inspired by the work of her late husband Roger Ebert.

== Personal life ==
Ebert was first married to electrical engineer Merle Smith. They had two children together. The couple later divorced. She was then married to film critic Roger Ebert from 1992 until his death in 2013. The couple first met in 1989 during an Alcoholics Anonymous meeting.

Ebert has had a history of alcoholism which intensified during her adult years, which led her to pursue recovery through Alcoholics Anonymous during the late 1980's. In the 2014 documentary Life Itself, Ebert discussed her battle with alcoholism for the first time on record, stating that she emphasized the AA program's role in fostering discipline and communal accountability as being essential for sustained abstinence. She also stated that the participation in the AA provided empirical structure, which aligned with evidence from recovery literature that peer-led groups correlate with the much higher long-term rates of sobriety compared to isolated efforts.

== Filmography ==
=== Film ===
Year	Title	Role	Notes
2000	The 37th Annual Publicist Guild of America Awards	Herself	TV special
2007	The 17th Annual Gotham Awards	Herself	TV special
2013	Roger Ebert's 14th Annual Film Festival: A Retrospective	Herself	Short film
2014	Life Itself	Herself	
2019	90 Years of the Music Box Theatre	Herself	Short film
2019	Benjamin Marshall Architect	Herself	Short film
2021	3rd Annual AAFCA TV Honors	Herself	TV special
2024	The 15th Annual AAFCA Awards	Herself	TV special

=== Television ===
Year	Title	Role	Notes
2010	The Oprah Winfrey Show	Guest	Episode: "Oprah's Pre-Oscar Special"
2011	Ebert Presents: At the Movies	Contributor	10 episodes
2013	Entertainment Tonight	Herself	1 episode
2014	HuffPost Live Conversations	Guest	1 episode
2014	Tavis Smiley	Guest	1 episode
2014	The Tonight Show Starring Jimmy Fallon	Herself	Episode: "Dan Aykroyd/Chaz Ebert/Nick Thune"
2014-2015	The Insider	Herself	2 episodes
2019	CTV News at 11:30 Toronto	Herself	1 episode
2019	CTV News at Noon Tornoto	Herself	1 episode
2024	Tamron Hall	Herself	Episode: "Let's Get Lit! (2024) #2"

=== Audio ===
Year	Title	Role	Notes
2014	LCJ Q&A Podcast	Guest	Episode: "Chaz Ebert"
2018	Maltin on Movies	Guest	Episode: "Chaz Ebert"
2019	Talk Easy with Sam Fragoso	Herself	Episode: "Chaz Ebert"
2022	Lagralane Spirits	Guest	Episode: "Passing Part 2 - The Roles We Play"

== Publications ==
- Chaz Ebert (May 7, 2024). It's Time to Give a FECK: Elevating Humanity through Forgiveness, Empathy, Compassion, and Kindness. Forefront Books. ISBN 9781637632475.

== Awards and honors ==
On September 28, 2022, Ebert was awarded the FACETS Legend Award at the 2022 Screen Gems Benefit for her efforts to promote diversity within the film world.
