= Howard Higman =

American sociologist (1915–1995)

- Born: April 25, 1915
- Died: November 22, 1995 (aged 80); Boulder, Colorado
- Occupation: Sociology professor
- Known for: Founding The World Affairs Conference

Howard Higman (April 25, 1915 – November 22, 1995) was an American sociologist notable as the founder of the Conference on World Affairs in 1948.
