= RogerEbert.com =

American film review website

- Website type: Film review
- Available in: English
- Country of origin: United States
- Owner: Ebert Digital LLC
- Founder: Roger Ebert
- Website: rogerebert.com
- Current status: Active

RogerEbert.com is an American film review website that archives reviews written by film critic Roger Ebert for the Chicago Sun-Times and also shares other critics' reviews and essays. The website, underwritten by the Chicago Sun-Times, was launched in 2002. Ebert handpicked writers from around the world to contribute to the website. After Ebert died in 2013, the website was relaunched under Ebert Digital, a partnership founded between Ebert's wife Chaz and friend Josh Golden.

== Background ==
Two months after Ebert's death, Chaz Ebert hired film and television critic Matt Zoller Seitz as editor-in-chief for the website because his IndieWire blog PressPlay shared multiple contributors with RogerEbert.com, and because both websites promoted each other's content.

The Dissolve's Noel Murray described the website's collection of Ebert reviews as "an invaluable resource, both for getting some front-line perspective on older movies, and for getting a better sense of who Ebert was." Murray said the website included reviews Ebert rarely discussed in conversation, such as those for Chelsea Girls (1966) and Good Times (1967), written when Ebert was in his twenties. R. Kurt Osenlund of Slant said in 2013 that other contributors (including Seitz, Sheila O'Malley, and Odie Henderson) had "a lot of first-person narrative" in their work like Ebert did, adding, "but there are other contributors, like Ignatiy Vishnevetsky, who don't do so much of that. The overall diversity makes the site a kind of artists' collective."

RogerEbert.com has routinely hosted a "Women Writer's Week" in honor of Women's History Month, featuring content from female contributors for the entire week. Following the 2016 United States presidential election, the "Women Writer's Week" in 2017 was described by Observer to be "overtly political thanks to President Donald Trump". Chaz Ebert said the 2017 Women's March helped motivate female contributors to contribute their perspective to film and politics.

== Year end lists ==
Roger Ebert compiled "best of the year" movie lists beginning in 1967 until 2012. Since Ebert died, the practice has continued since 2014 with his website. The primary contributors do a Borda count where each critic ranks films, with ten points for the first-placed film to one point for the tenth-placed film. The scores are compiled and best film of the year is based on poll results.

- 2014: Under the Skin
- 2015: Mad Max: Fury Road
- 2016: Moonlight
- 2017: Lady Bird
- 2018: Roma
- 2019: The Irishman
- 2020: Small Axe: Lovers Rock
- 2021: The Power of the Dog
- 2022: The Banshees of Inisherin
- 2023: Killers of the Flower Moon
- 2024: The Brutalist
- 2025: One Battle After Another
