= College of Media (University of Illinois Urbana-Champaign) =

College at the University of Illinois Urbana-Champaign

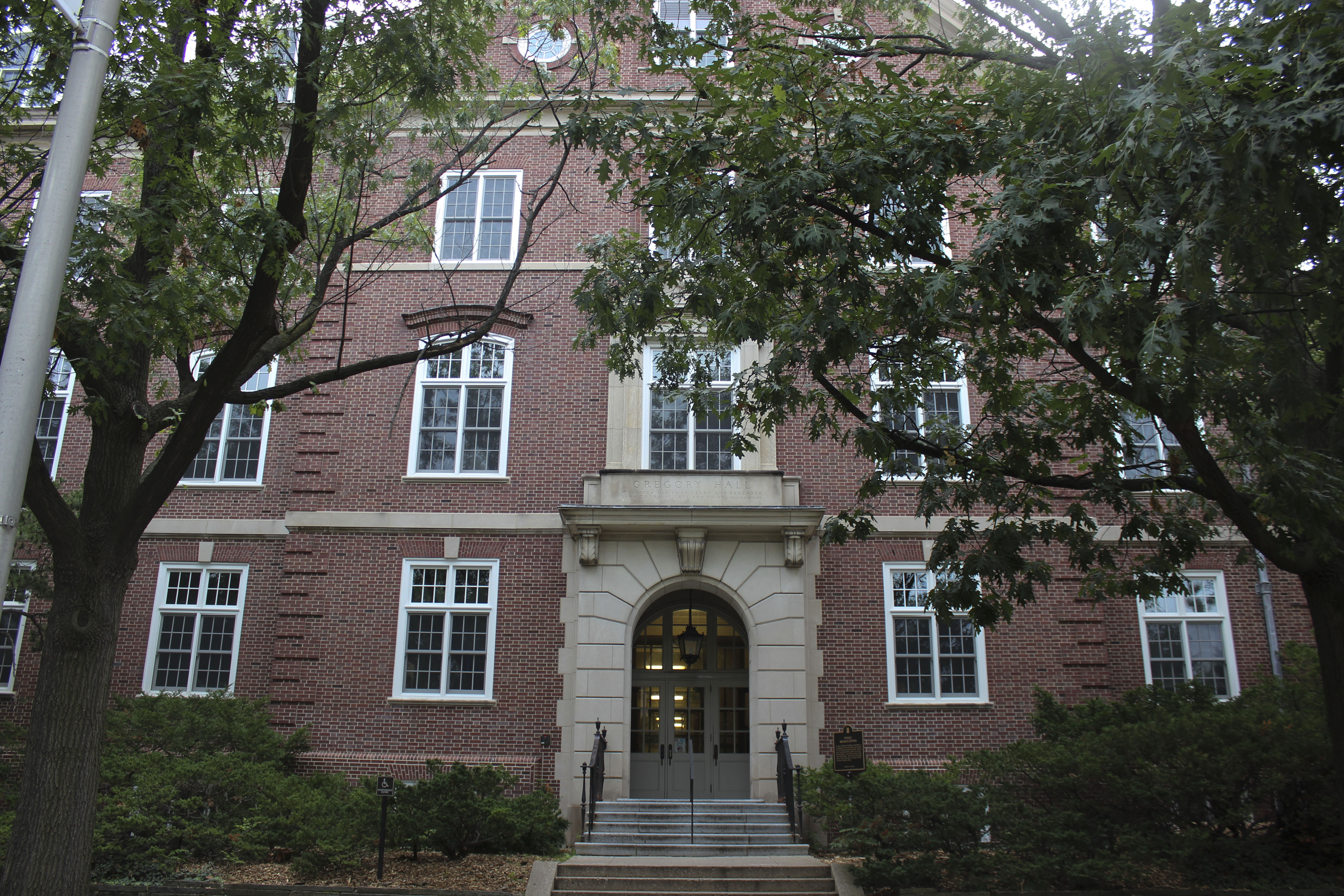
- Gregory Hall, home of the College of Media
- Former name: College of Communications
- Motto: Leaders, Independent Thinkers, Innovators, Citizens
- Type: Public
- Established: 1927 (School of Journalism); 1946 (Dept. of Advertising); 1948 (College)
- Affiliations: University of Illinois
- Dean: Tracy Sulkin
- Students: 1,153
- Undergraduates: 1,082
- Postgraduates: 71
- Location: Urbana, Illinois, United States; 40.1056°N 88.2281°W
- Website: www.media.illinois.edu

The College of Media is the journalism school of the University of Illinois Urbana-Champaign, United States. The college's name changed from the College of Communications to the College of Media in 2008.

The College of Media offers Bachelor of Science degrees in Journalism, Advertising, Media and Cinema Studies, and (jointly with the College of Agricultural, Consumer and Environmental Sciences) Agricultural Communications. The college also partners with the Grainger College of Engineering to provide a "CS+" major in advertising which combines the academic study of advertising and computer science. Graduate degrees are offered with Master of Science degrees in Journalism and Advertising. A Doctor of Philosophy in Communications and Media is also available.

The College of Media is primarily housed in Gregory Hall. The Richmond Journalism Teaching Studio is also used for broadcast classes.

== College units ==
- Department of Agricultural Communication
- Department of Advertising
- Department of Journalism
  - CU-CitizenAccess, a community news website
- Department of Media and Cinema Studies
- Institute of Communications Research
- WILL – AM, FM, TV, and online

== Curriculum ==
The Urbana-Champaign area has Illini Media, which features the Daily Illini, WPGU Radio, the Illio yearbook, Buzz, www.the217.com, and the Technograph, an engineering magazine. Richmond Studio hosts UI-7 and WILL.

== Television stations ==
- 12 WILL-TV, PBS
- UI-7, cable TV service

== Radio stations ==
- 580 AM WILL, public radio
- 90.9 FM WILL-FM

== Notable alumni ==
Students and alumni have worked for organizations including the Chicago Bears, Chicago White Sox, WGN-TV, Fox TV, Universal Pictures, the Chicago Tribune, the Chicago Sun-Times, the St. Louis Post-Dispatch, Rolling Stone Magazine, CNN, WBBM-TV CBS 2 Chicago, the Champaign News-Gazette, the Associated Press, NBC 5 Chicago, WCIA, WPGU, Illini Media, UI-7, the Big Ten Network, the Chicago Rush, the Chicago Bandits, the Chicago Sky, the Chicago Wolves, the Chicago Storm, the Chicago Slaughter, the Chicago Shamrox, the Northwest Herald, KISS-FM, ESPN Rise magazine, KMOV CBS St. Louis, the NFL Network, and WGN Radio 720.

Pulitzer Prize winners

- Barry Bearak, M.S. 1974 – International Reporting, 2002
- Michael Colgrass, B.A. 1956 – Music, 1978
- George Crumb, M.A. 1952 – Music, 1968
- David Herbert Donald, M.A. 1942, Ph.D. 1946 – Biography, 1961 and 1988
- Carl Van Doren, B.A. 1907 – Biography, 1939
- Mark Van Doren, B.A. 1914 – Poetry, 1940
- Roger Ebert, B.S. 1964 – Criticism, 1975
- Roy J. Harris, B.A. 1925 – Public Service, 1950
- Glenn Howatt, M.S. 1986 – Pulitzer Prize for Local Reporting, 2013
- Paul Ingrassia, B.S. 1972 – Beat Reporting, 1993
- Allan Nevins, B.A. 1912, M.A. 1913 – Biography, 1933 and 1937
- James Reston, B.S. 1932 – National Reporting, 1945 and 1957
- Robert Lewis Taylor, B.A. 1933 – Fiction, 1959
- George F. Will, B.A. 1933 – Commentary, 1977

Broadcasting and journalism

- Steve Bardo – Big Ten Network announcer
- Roger Ebert – movie critic and author, B.S. 1964
- Paul Ingrassia – journalist, 1993 Pulitzer Prize winner, M.S. 1972
- Rick Kaplan – journalist, has worked for CNN, ABC, and MSNBC; has won 34 Emmys
- Will Leitch – sports writer/author; author of three books, including God Save the Fan, a book of essays; an editor of Deadspin
- Ash-har Quraishi – Chief Investigative Reporter for KCTV; Bureau Chief, CNN Pakistan

Media

- Robert "Buck" Brown – Playboy cartoonist, creator of the libinous "Granny" character, and whose drawings regularly addressed racial equality issues
- Dianne Chandler – Playboy Playmate of the Month, 1966
- Judith Ford (Judi Nash), B.S. – Miss America 1969
- Erika Harold – Miss America 2003
- Hugh Hefner, B.A. 1949 – founder of Playboy magazine
- Nicole Hollander, B.A. 1960 – syndicated cartoonist of Sylvia
- Henry Petroski, Ph.D. 1968 – civil engineer and writer
- Irna Phillips, 1923 – creator of the soap opera

Reporting and journalism

- Dan Balz, B.A. 1968, M.A. 1972 – The Washington Post national political reporter and editor; author
- B. Peter Bolek – 2005 Daily Southtown
- Chris Britt – editorial cartoonist
- John Chancellor – political analyst and newscaster for NBC Nightly News
- Roger Ebert, B.S. 1964 – film critic
- Bill Geist, 1968 – CBS News correspondent
- Robert Goralski, 1949 – NBC News correspondent
- Bob Grant – radio talk show personality
- Herb Keinon – columnist and journalist for The Jerusalem Post
- Frederick C Klein, B.A. 1959 – sportswriter The Wall Street Journal and author
- Carol Marin, A.B. 1970 – former news anchor, 60 Minutes correspondent, and Illinois Journalist of the Year (1988)
- Robert Novak, B.A. 1952 – political commentator and columnist
- Ian Punnett – radio talk show personality, and Saturday night host of Coast to Coast AM
- B. Mitchel Reed, B.S., M.A. – popular radio personality in Los Angeles and New York
- Dan Savage – advice columnist (Savage Love) and theater director
- Gene Shalit, 1949 – film critic
- Douglas Wilson – television personality and designer

Literature

- Nelson Algren, B.S. 1931 – author of 1950 National Book Award-winning The Man With the Golden Arm
- Ann Bannon, B.A. 1955 – pulp fiction author of "The Beebo Brinker Chronicles"
- Dee Brown, M.S. 1951 – author of Bury My Heart at Wounded Knee
- John F. Callahan, M.A., Ph.D. – literary executor for Ralph Ellison
- Iris Chang, B.A. 1989 – author of The Rape of Nanking
- Dave Eggers, attended 1980s and 90s, B.S. 2002 – author of A Heartbreaking Work of Staggering Genius
- Stanley Elkin, B.A. 1952, Ph.D. 1961 – National Book Critics Circle Award winner for George Mills in 1982 and for Mrs. Ted Bliss in 1995
- Lee Falk, 1932 – creator of The Phantom and Mandrake the Magician
- Irene Hunt, B.A. 1939 – Newbery Medal-winning author of Up a Road Slowly
- Richard Powers, M.A. 1979 – novelist

Advertising and marketing

- Helen Min, B.S. 2005, M.S. 2006 – founding member of Facebook and former Head of Vertical Marketing, Global Business Marketing in Facebook, current head of enterprise marketing at Dropbox
