= WILL =

WILL may refer to:

- WILL (AM), a radio station (580 AM), licensed to Urbana, Illinois, United States
- WILL-FM, a radio station (90.9 FM), licensed to Urbana, Illinois, United States
- WILL-TV, a television station (PSIP 12/RF 9), licensed to Urbana, Illinois, United States
- Wisconsin Institute for Law and Liberty, a conservative law firm
- Women in Law and Litigation ("WILL"), in India
- Radin Inten II International Airport (ICAO: WILL)

== See also ==
- Will (disambiguation)
