= Illinois Public Media =

Broadcasting non-profit

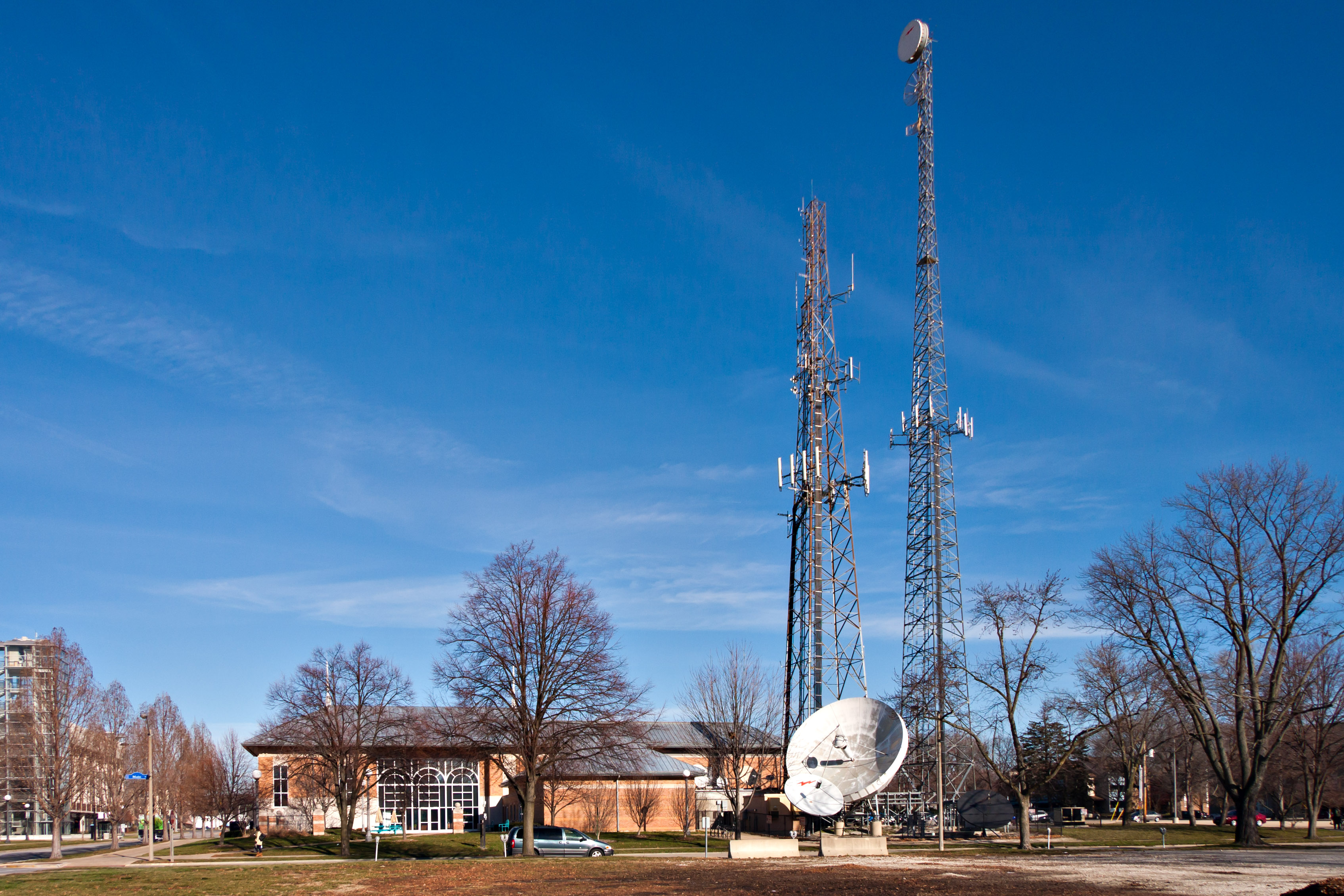
Campbell Hall at the University of Illinois, home of Illinois Public Media

Illinois Public Media, previously "WILL AM-FM-TV", is a not-for-profit organization located within the College of Media at the University of Illinois Urbana-Champaign, which is responsible for the university's public media service activities. It manages three university educational broadcasting stations licensed to Urbana, Illinois, United States: NPR member stations WILL (580 AM) and WILL-FM (90.9 FM), and PBS member station WILL-TV (VHF digital channel 9, virtual channel 12). Illinois Public Media provides locally produced programs to supplement the network programs carried by its stations. In addition, it manages the Illinois Radio Reader Service, a streaming audio service for the reading impaired.

Offices and studios are located at the university's Campbell Hall for Public Telecommunication. Illinois Public Media's CEO and General Manager is Maurice "Moss" Bresnahan.

== History ==
The initial broadcasting station at the University of Illinois, WILL (originally WRM), was first licensed as an AM station in 1922. An FM station, WILL-FM (originally WIUC), was introduced in 1942, and a TV station, WILL-TV debuted in 1955. From 1942 to 1998, these station's studios were located at university's Gregory Hall. After World War II, the university hosted the National Association of Educational Broadcasters (NAEB) for the establishment of broadcast allocations (AM/FM radio and TV channels) for non-commercial education programming. The NAEB was based at Gregory Hall from 1951 to 1961.

The Rockefeller Foundation funded two-week seminars in 1949 (Allerton I) and 1950 (Allerton II) of 22 educational broadcasters from across the United States. The outcomes from these meetings established the foundation for National Public Radio and the Public Broadcasting Service.

In 1978 the Illinois Radio Reader Service, an audio service for the reading impaired, was introduced. Initially the service was exclusively broadcast over a WILL-FM subcarrier, as a Subsidiary Communications Authority (SCA) transmission that could only be received by persons equipped with special receivers that were loaned to qualified individuals. As of 2018 it was estimated that around 300 persons were supplied with the special receivers, and a similar number were listening to the service over the internet.

WILL radio and TV operations received its largest bequest, $1 million, from Lois Dickson, who had been a contributor to the station for the thirty years before her death at the age of 95 in 2004.

In 2009, the department responsible for public broadcasting activities, then known as "WILL AM-FM-TV", was renamed "Illinois Public Media". Reasons given for the name change included "to reflect WILL's expansion into the Internet and outreach projects in the community" and to "strengthen its ties to the University of Illinois". In April 2010, General Manager Mark Leonard announced a series of cost-reducing measures "to address ongoing budget concerns", including the elimination of its weather department.

== See also ==
- Illini Media - university-independent not-for-profit organization that runs radio station WPGU and the Daily Illini
- Prairie Fire - a 15+ season running television news magazine and documentary program produced by WILL-TV
