= KESD =

KESD may refer to:

- KESD (FM), a radio station (88.3 FM) licensed to Brookings, South Dakota, United States
- KESD-TV, a television station (channel 18) licensed to Brookings, South Dakota, United States
