= KUSD =

KUSD may refer to:

- KUSD (FM), a radio station (89.7 FM) licensed to Vermillion, South Dakota, United States
- KUSD-TV, a television station (channel 2 analog/34 digital) licensed to Vermillion, South Dakota, United States
- KUSD (AM), a defunct radio station (690 AM) licensed to Vermillion, South Dakota, United States

== See also ==
- Kenosha Unified School District, a school district based in Kenosha, Wisconsin.
- Kingman Unified School District, a school district based in Kingman, Arizona.
