= Illini =

Illini may refer to:

- Illini and Saluki, a pair of passenger trains operated by Amtrak between Chicago and Carbondale, Illinois
- Illini State Park, an Illinois state park on 510 acres (206 ha) in LaSalle County, Illinois, United States
- Illinois Confederation (also known as the Illini or Illiniwek), a group of 12–13 Native American tribes in the upper Mississippi River valley of North America
- Features and affiliates of the University of Illinois Urbana-Champaign:
  - The Fighting Illini intercollegiate athletic teams
  - The Daily Illini newspaper
  - Illini Media, which owns the Daily Illini
  - Illini Union, the student activity center
