= WILL (AM) =

- Urbana, Illinois; United States
- Broadcast area: Champaign-Urbana
- Frequency: 580 kHz
- Branding: WILL AM 580

Programming
- Format: News/talk
- Affiliations: NPR

Ownership
- Owner: University of Illinois Urbana-Champaign; (The Board of Trustees of the University of Illinois)
- Sister stations: WILL-FM, WILL-TV

History
- First air date: March 27, 1922 (experimental under calls 9XJ 1920-1922)
- Former call signs: WRM (1922–1928)
- Former frequencies: 833 kHz (1922–1924); 1100 kHz (1924–1928); 890 kHz (1928–1937)
- Call sign meaning: Illinois

Technical information
- Licensing authority: FCC
- Facility ID: 68941
- Class: D
- Power: 5,000 watts (daytime); 335 watts (pre-sunrise); 100 watts (night)
- Transmitter coordinates: 40°04′51.1″N 88°14′10.2″W
- Repeater: 90.9 WILL-FM HD3 (Urbana)

Links
- Public license information: Public file; LMS
- Webcast: will.illinois.edu/am/willplayer/

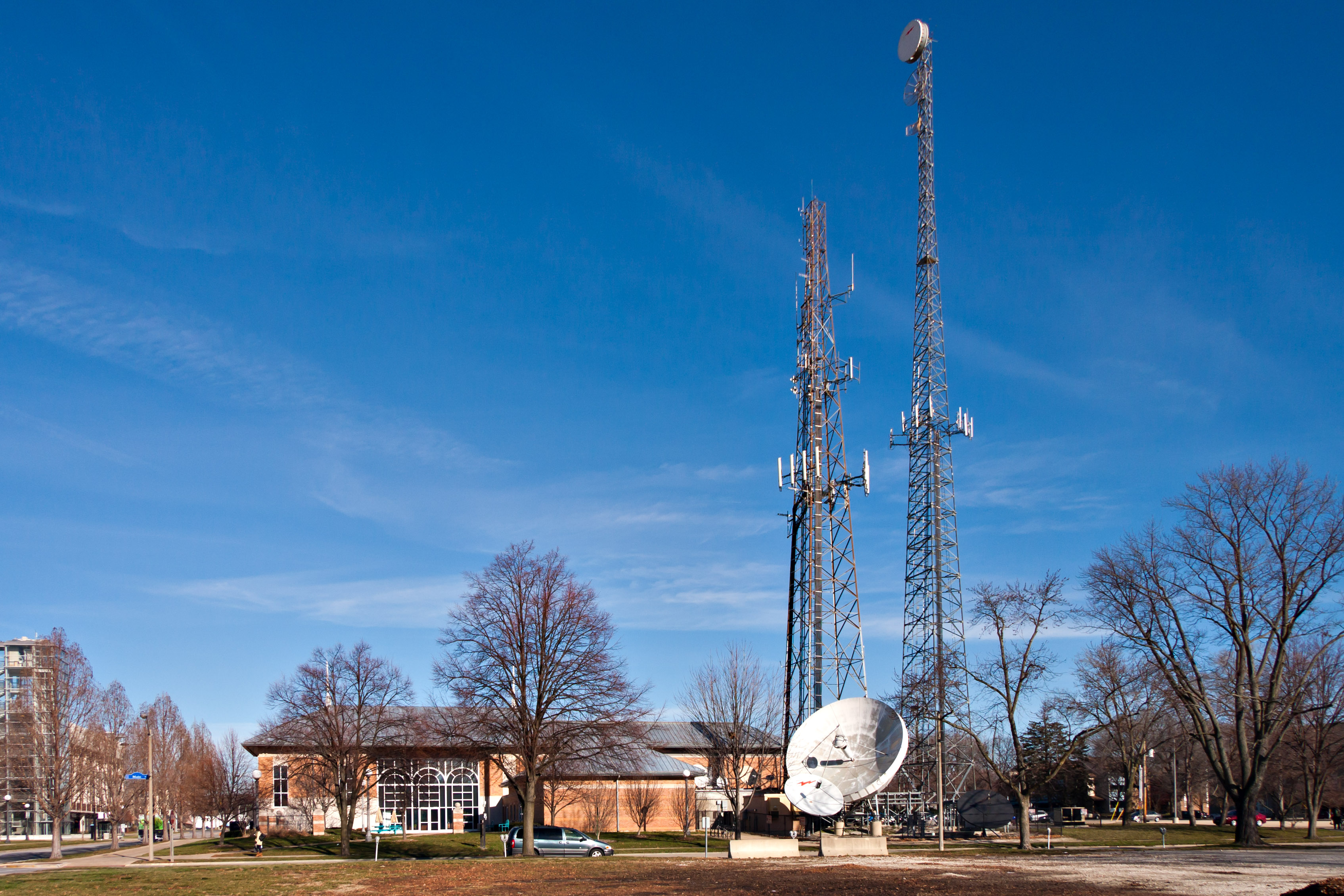
Campbell Hall at the University of Illinois, home of the Illinois Public Media, including the WILL studios

WILL (580 AM) is a public broadcasting station owned by the University of Illinois Urbana-Champaign and licensed to Urbana, Illinois, United States. It is operated by Illinois Public Media, with studios located at Campbell Hall for Public Telecommunication on the university campus.

WILL is directional, mostly to protect co-channel WIBW in Topeka, Kansas. It operates at 5,000 watts during the day. Due to its location near the bottom of the AM dial, as well as its transmitter power, directional antenna and central Illinois's flat land (with high ground conductivity), its daytime footprint is almost as large as that of a full-power FM station. It provides grade B coverage as far north as Chicago and as far east as Indianapolis. At sunset it must reduce power to 500 watts and gradually power down to 100 watts, resulting in marginal coverage even in Champaign-Urbana. At 6 a.m., it increases its power to 335 watts and ramps up to full power at sunrise.

== Programming ==
WILL is a National Public Radio (NPR) member and an affiliate of Public Radio International (PRI) and American Public Media (APM). It airs NPR news and talk, along with agricultural news information for central Illinois farmers.

== History ==
In mid-1920, the University of Illinois at Urbana was issued an Experimental radio station license with the call sign 9XJ. Although primarily used for technical training and experimental purposes, by 1921, 9XJ was also being used to broadcast athletic scores, and in early 1922, plans were announced to add musical presentations. However, effective December 1, 1921, the Department of Commerce, which regulated radio at this time, adopted regulations requiring that stations making broadcasts intended for the general public obtain a "Limited Commercial" license. This new requirement resulted in 9XJ ending its entertainment broadcasts, although the station continued to be used for experimental and training purposes.

In early March, it was announced that preparations were being made to apply for a Limited Commercial license that authorized broadcasting, in addition to point-to-point communication with other universities. On March 28, 1922, the university was issued a license, with the call letters WRM, for the 360 meter (833 kHz) "entertainment" wavelength and for point-to-point communication on 410 meters (732 kHz). Although the station call sign was randomly assigned, it was sometimes later said to have signified "We Reach Millions". In late 1924, the station moved to 1100 kHz.

WRM was one of many AM stations signed on by universities (mostly land-grant institutions like University of Illinois) in the early days of radio. Many of these stations struggled financially, since they operated non-commercially. In 1925, WRM received a major financial boast when Boetius H. Sullivan decided to provide extensive financial support in order to establish the station as a memorial to his father, Roger C. Sullivan, who had died five years earlier. The Sullivan donation consisted of an initial $100,000, plus annual contributions of $8,000 for maintenance and operations. This financed the purchase of a 1,000 watt transmitter, plus construction at 400 South Wright Street of a new studio building and "flat-top" antenna structure.

On November 11, 1928, under the provisions of the Federal Radio Commission's General Order 40, the station's frequency was changed to 890 kHz, on a timeshare basis with KUSD in Vermillion, South Dakota, and KFNF in Shenandoah, Iowa. At this time WRM's call sign was also changed to the current WILL. Under an agreement with its two timeshare partners, WILL was assigned the timeslots of 5 to 6 p.m. and 7:30 to 8:00 p.m. daily.

In 1937, WILL moved to 580 kHz, initially with 1,000 watts, using a two tower directional array constructed at South First Street. Because it no longer had to timeshare, this new assignment allowed an increase in hours of operation. However, the station was now generally restricted to operation only during daytime hours, although it was also occasionally authorized to operate at night, with power reduced to 250 watts, in order to broadcast Illini basketball games and the Illinois High School Boys Basketball Championship. In December 1938, WILL's power was increased to 5,000 watts. In late 1942, the university began operating an FM station, originally WIUC (now WILL-FM), which allowed for the addition of regular nighttime programming after WILL was required to sign-off at sunset. The station has since been authorized for nighttime operations, albeit at somewhat reduced power.

From 1942 to 1998, WILL's studios were located at University of Illinois at Urbana–Champaign's Gregory Hall. In 1994, the station began broadcasting 24-hours a day, airing the BBC World Service overnight. Until 2014, it also served as the default NPR member station for Terre Haute, Indiana, which lacked a full-power NPR member station until WISU began carrying NPR programming that year as a satellite of WFYI-FM in Indianapolis.

== See also ==
- Illini Media - university-independent not-for-profit organization that runs radio station WPGU and the Daily Illini
- List of initial AM-band station grants in the United States
