= Boodhoo =

Boodhoo is a Mauritian surname. Notable people with the name include:

- Harish Boodhoo (born 1946), Mauritian political figure
- Isaiah James Boodhoo (1932–2004), Trinidadian painter and writer
- Niala Boodhoo, American journalist
