= Statue of Roger Ebert =

Statue in Champaign, Illinois, U.S.

C-U at the Movies
- Interactive map of C-U at the Movies
- Location: Virginia Theatre, Champaign, Illinois, United States
- Coordinates: 40°7′2″N 88°14′43″W
- Designer: Rick Harney
- Type: Statue
- Material: Bronze
- Width: 6 feet (1.8 m)
- Weight: 750 pounds (340 kg) or 1,200 pounds (540 kg) (Note: Sources vary on the exact weight of the sculpture, with given values of 750 pounds (340 kg) and 1,200 pounds (540 kg).)
- Dedicated date: July 3, 2014
- Dedicated to: Roger Ebert

C-U at the Movies is a statue of film critic Roger Ebert located outside of the Virginia Theatre in Champaign, Illinois. The bronze statue was designed by sculptor Rick Harney. It was unveiled at the 2014 Ebertfest—an annual film festival established by Ebert and held at the theater—and formally dedicated later that year. The interactive artwork consists of a sculpture of a seated Ebert giving a thumbs-up, with two empty seats allowing for visitors to pose with him.

== History ==
Roger Ebert was a film critic who worked for the Chicago Sun-Times newspaper. During his career, he became the first film critic to be awarded a Pulitzer Prize for Criticism, which he won in 1975, and hosted the nationally broadcast film review television program At the Movies with fellow critic Gene Siskel. Additionally, he established Ebertfest, an annual film festival held at the Virginia Theatre in Champaign, Illinois, near his hometown of Urbana, with the intention of screening what he considered to be overlooked films. He died in April 2013 due to cancer.

Plans for a statue of Ebert started around 2011. Donna Anderson, the travel agent for Ebertfest, had the idea while awaiting a heart transplantation at the McGaw Medical Center. The overall design came about after she saw a statue of politician Adlai Stevenson II at the Central Illinois Regional Airport near Bloomington. That statue had been designed by Rick Harney, a sculptor based out of Normal, Illinois, who was contacted to design a statue of Ebert in a similar style. Carney was at the time retired and not accepting commissions for new art pieces, but accepted the work as both he and his autistic son were fans of Ebert and bonded over his film reviews.

The Public Art League, a nonprofit organization, oversaw the project, working in collaboration with the Champaign Park District, the University of Illinois College of Media, and the city governments of both Champaign and Urbana to erect the statue outside of the Virginia Theatre in downtown Champaign. The statue project was publicly announced in September 2013, and the following month, Harney created an initial model made of cardboard, Plastilina, and plywood. It took him about six months to create the finished sculpture. The finished sculpture was cast at a foundry in Mount Morris, Illinois. Much of the financing for the project came from fundraising, which was coordinated by Scott Anderson, Donna's husband, and included donations from about 150 people and organizations, including film director Martin Scorsese and Ebert's widow, Chaz. Incentives for donating included a miniature version of the statue to anyone who gave at least $10,000 to the project. The total cost of the project was $122,500 (equivalent to $166,600 in 2025), with the city government of Champaign covering the installation and lighting costs of $10,000.

=== Unveiling and dedication ===
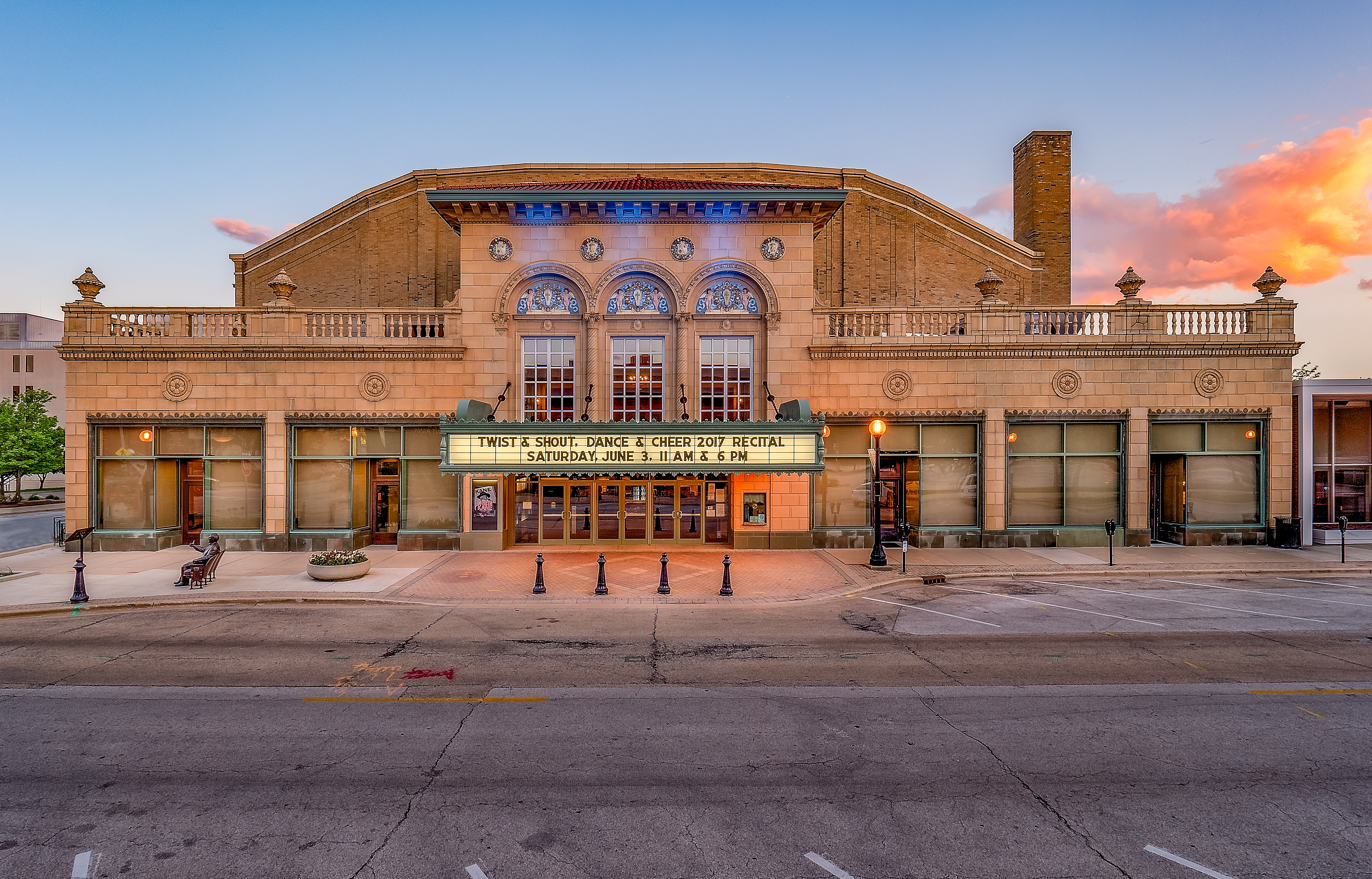
The statue (visible at left in 2017) was unveiled outside of the Virginia Theatre in Champaign, Illinois, on April 24, 2014, during Ebertfest.

At noon on April 24, 2014, during the second day of that year's Ebertfest, Donna and Scott Anderson officially unveiled the statue outside of the theater. Scott served as the unofficial master of ceremonies for the event, which drew an audience of about 200 people. Allegro non molto by Antonio Vivaldi was played during the unveiling. During the ceremony, Chaz stated that her late husband would have been honored by the statue, but also embarrassed due to his modesty. Chaz also stated that Ebert was hesitant to have a statue erected in his honor, telling her "I don't want it to be like a carnival attraction. If it's art, that's one thing. If it's a carnival attraction, that's another thing". However, Ebert ultimately left the decision up to Chaz, who was convinced by Donna of the artistic merit of the sculpture and gave the project her blessing.

The statue was only a temporary exhibit during the festival, being fixed on a wooden platform near the theater. However, the organizers planned for it to be permanently installed at a later date. Following the festival, the Champaign Park District, which also owns the theater, took ownership of the sculpture, further agreeing to oversee its permanent placement and insurance. The statue's permanent installation occurred on July 1, with a dedication taking place on July 3. Chaz attended this ceremony, which drew a crowd of about 200 people. Also during the dedication, two plaques—a commemorative one about Ebert and another that listed donors who gave more than $1,000 to the project—were also installed near the statue. The commemorative plaque reads:

Renowned film critic, co-star of 'At the Movies' television series with Gene Siskel and son of Urbana, Roger Ebert changed the way people thought about movies. The University of Illinois graduate was the film critic for The Chicago Sun-Times for 46 years. He was the first journalist to win the Pulitzer Prize for film criticism; to be inducted as an honorary member of the Directors Guild of America; to receive the American Society of Cinematographers Award; and to have his star on the Hollywood Walk of Fame and at the Chicago Theatre. He also received the highest honor from the State of Illinois, the Order of Lincoln.

In 1998, he and his wife, Chaz, brought the Ebertfest Film Festival to his hometown. He said that empathy was one of the most important aspects of civilization, and that movies were a giant empathy machine. He was a visionary, mentor and technologist. And a loving husband and family man.

Sculpture by Rick Harney.

In April 2015, prior to the start of that year's Ebertfest, Harney performed some minor preservation work on the statue, applying wax to certain parts of the sculpture in order to hinder oxygenation.

== Design ==
The statue, officially titled C-U at the Movies as a reference to Ebert's signature complimentary close, is made of bronze and depicts a life-size Ebert sitting in a theatre chair flanked by two empty seats on either side. Chaz has described the work as "interactive art", as it allows for people to sit alongside Ebert. Ebert is giving a thumbs-up, a hand sign he used on At the Movies to indicate a good film. At Chaz's request, Ebert is depicted as he would have looked in his 50s or 60s, when the film festival first began. Also at Chaz's request, Carney said that he made Ebert look slimmer. The sculpture is 6 feet (1.8 m) wide and weighs several hundred pounds. It is located outside of the theater, near the intersection of Park Avenue and Randolph Street, facing north.
