= Prairie Fire =

Prairie Fire may refer to:

== Arts, entertainment, and media ==
- Prairie Fire (magazine), a Canadian literary magazine
- Prairie Fire (TV program), a news magazine/documentary program, University of Illinois at Urbana-Champaign, Illinois, United States
- Prairie Fire: The Politics of Revolutionary Anti-Imperialism, a manifesto by the American radical group Weather Underground
- Prairie Fire Organizing Committee, an American anti-capitalist activist group
- A 1955 painting by Blackbear Bosin
- S.O.G. Prairie Fire, downloadable content in the video game ARMA 3
- a 1977 film by John Hanson and Rob Nilsson

== Other uses ==
- Operation Prairie Fire, a 1968 US Studies and Observations Group (SOG) reconnaissance mission into Laos as part of Operation Dewey Canyon
- Operation Prairie Fire, US military strikes against Libya in 1986
- Prairie Fire (ringette team), a team in Canada's National Ringette League
- Saskatchewan Prairie Fire, of the Rugby Canada Super League
- Wildfire, in grassland
- Knox College (Illinois), Galesburg, Illinois
- Castilleja, a genus of plants

== See also ==
- Museum at Prairiefire, Overland Park, Kansas
- Prairie Fires:The American Dreams of Laura Ingalls Wilder, a literary biography.
