= Niala Boodhoo =

American journalist

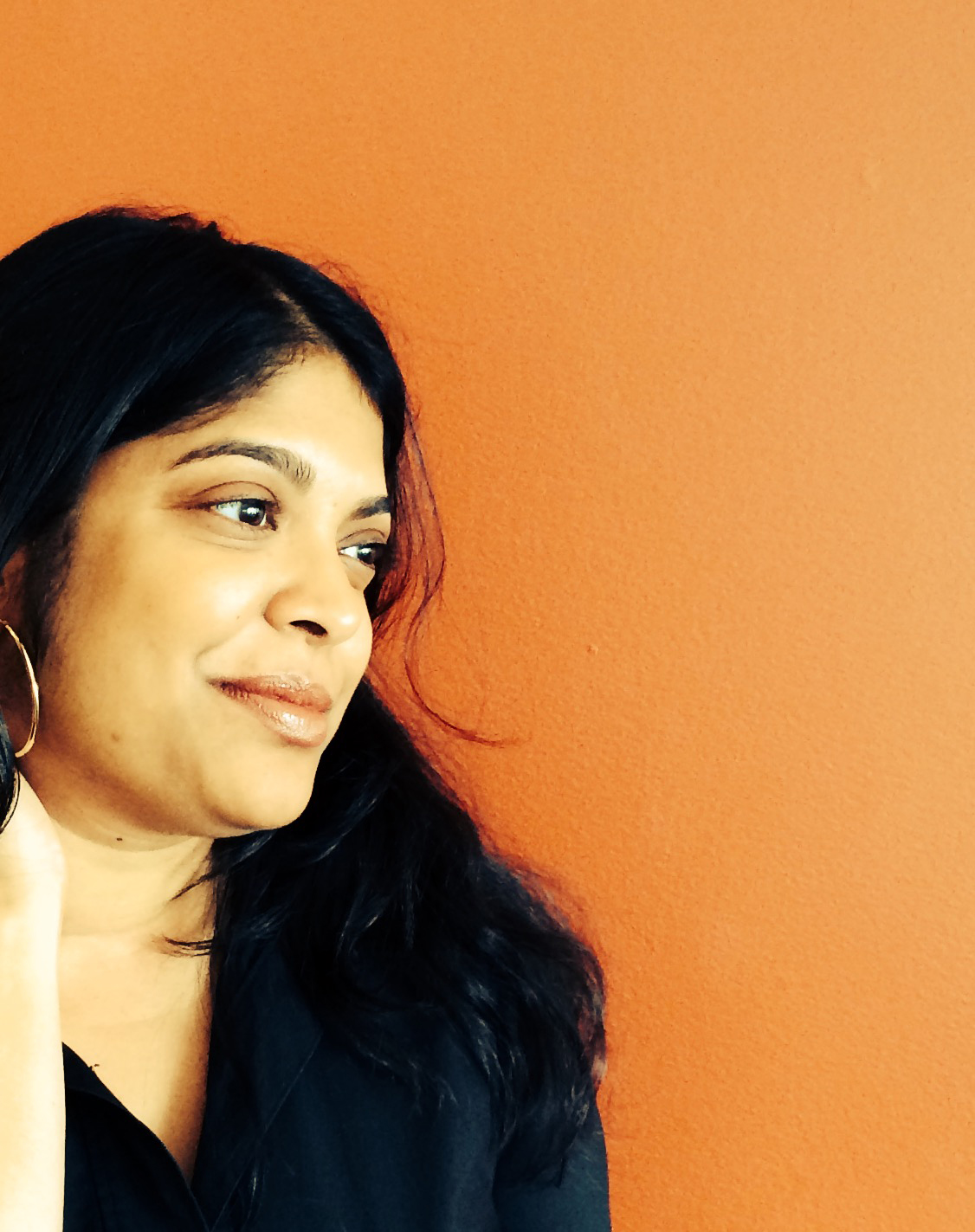
- Niala Boodhoo (Wikimedia)
- Born: Miami, Florida, US
- Education: St. Thomas University (Florida) (Certif.); Northwestern University (MSJ); Florida International University (MA); Calvin University (BA)

Niala Boodhoo is an American journalist, Knight-Wallace Fellow and the host of Axios Today.

For three years she was the founding host and executive producer of Illinois Public Media's statewide radio talk show, The 21st. Previously a business reporter for the Miami Herald and Chicago Public Media, she hosted WBEZ's mid-day talk show, The Afternoon Shift, before joining WILL in Urbana, Illinois. Boodhoo also served as the vice president for broadcast of the Asian American Journalists Association from 2012 to 2016.

== Personal life ==
Boodhoo was born and raised in Miami. The daughter of Indo-Trinidadian immigrants from Trinidad and Tobago, she is a first-generation American.

After earning her Bachelor of Arts in philosophy and psychology at Calvin University in Grand Rapids, Michigan, she taught preschool and high school journalism in Port-au-Prince, Haiti.

Boodhoo had a cameo appearance on an episode of the Netflix original series Easy, in which she played herself across from comedian Marc Maron.

== Career ==
Boodhoo's first professional exposure to journalism came through an internship with the Miami Herald the summer before her senior year of high school. The Herald published her first news story, about Hurricane Andrew. After earning her master's degree in journalism from Northwestern University's Medill School of Journalism, she worked as an editorial assistant for the AP and later as a reporter for Reuters in London and Washington, D.C. Boodhoo moved back to Florida to work as the Sun-Sentinel's senior business writer, before returning to the Herald as a business reporter.

Boodhoo transitioned from commercial to public media while working as a multimedia reporter at the Herald. There, she produced The Miami Herald Friday Business Report, which aired weekly on WLRN-FM, Miami's NPR member station. She later moved to Chicago to join Chicago Public Media's "Changing Gears" reporting project, which covered the economic transformation of the Rust Belt and the stories of people living in the industrial Midwest affected by the transformation. After working as WBEZ's only business reporter, she was tapped to succeed Rick Kogan as the host of WBEZ's mid-day talk show, The Afternoon Shift. After hosting the show for two years, WBEZ canceled The Afternoon Shift to focus on its morning programming. Illinois Public Media later hired Boodhoo to serve as executive producer and host of The 21st, a daily public radio talk show that focuses on statewide Illinois issues. She stepped down from The 21st at the end of July 2019.

Boodhoo shifted back to commercial podcasting as the host of Axios Today, a brief morning news show, beginning with its launch on 22 June 2020.
