= Virginia Theatre (Champaign) =

Movie theater in Champaign, Illinois, United States

The Historic Virginia Theatre
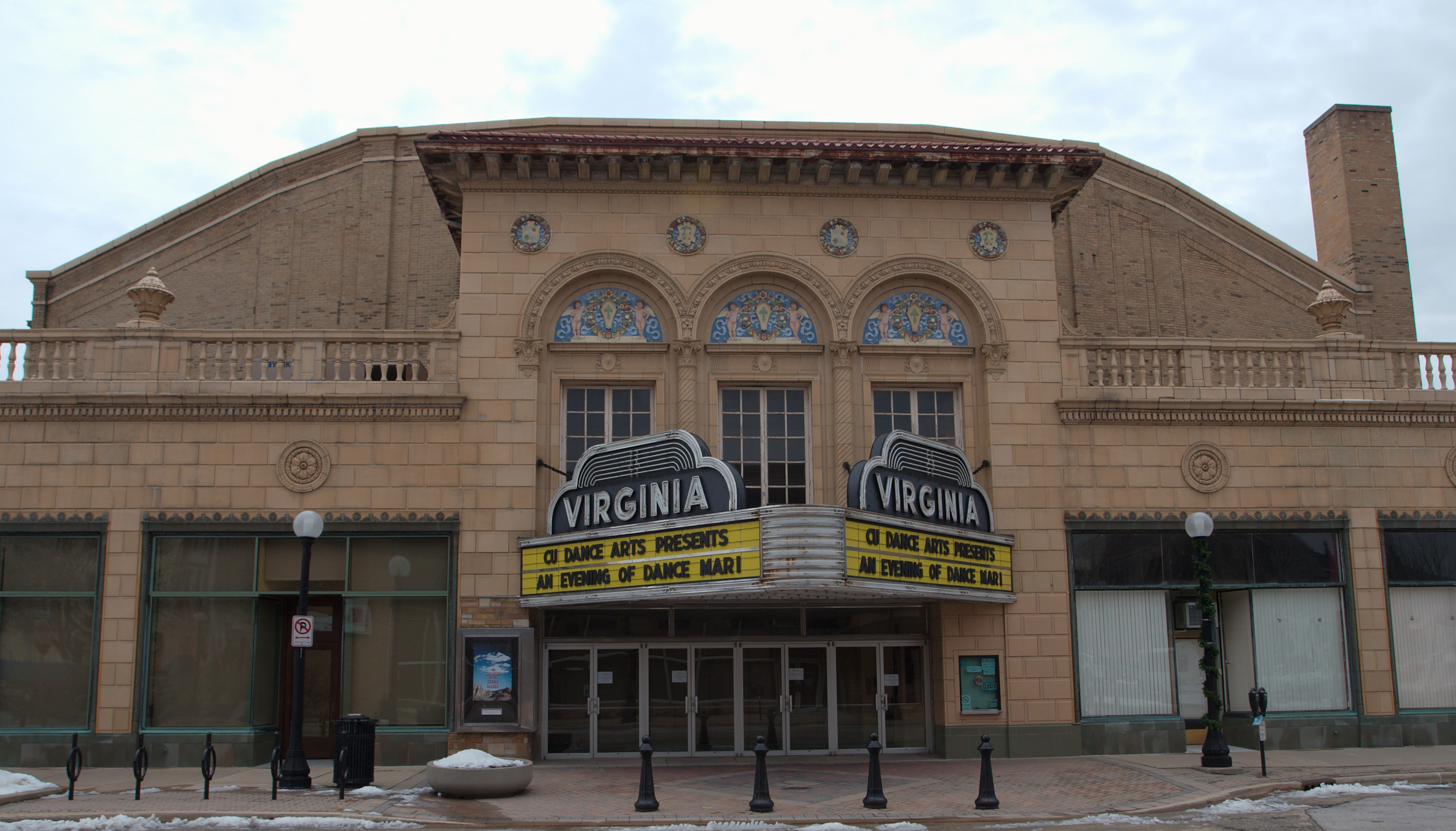
- Virginia Theatre, circa 2008
- Interactive map of The Historic Virginia Theatre
- Location: 203 W. Park Champaign, IL 61820
- Owner: Champaign Park District
- Capacity: 1,463
- Type: Renovated theatre

Construction
- Opened: December 28, 1921
- Virginia Theater
- U.S. National Register of Historic Places
- Location within Illinois Location within the United States
- Location: 203 W. Park Ave., Champaign, Illinois
- Coordinates: 40°7′1.2″N 88°14′43.8″W
- Area: less than one acre
- Built: 1921
- Architect: C. Howard Crane and Kenneth Franzheim, George Ramey
- Architectural style: Renaissance
- NRHP reference No.: 03001201
- Added to NRHP: November 28, 2003

The Virginia Theatre is a live performance and movie theatre in downtown Champaign, Illinois. It has been providing theatrical and cinematic entertainment to the Champaign-Urbana community since its doors opened in 1921. Each year, the Virginia Theatre is host to movies from film reels, plays from various acting troupes, concerts, and Ebertfest, presented by the UIUC College of Media. It is currently owned by the Champaign Park District.

== History ==
The Virginia Theatre opened December 28, 1921 with a live stage performance of The Bat. The following night, the silent films Tol'able David and The Boat were shown at the theatre. Since then, it has been presenting movies, live concerts, and plays to the Champaign-Urbana community and has only been closed for short periods of renovation by the Park District. Until recently, the Virginia Theatre was privately owned. From the 1930s to the 1960s, RKO Pictures held ownership. Subsequently, George Kerasotes Corporation (GKC Theatres) owned the building until it was sold to the Virginia Theater Group, a not-for-profit organization, organized for that purpose in the 1990s. The Champaign Park District purchased it in January 2000.

The theatre was added to the National Register of Historic Places in 2003, based on its historical role in providing a wide variety of entertainment to Champaign and surrounding area, particularly in the years between 1921 and 1953. Of note were theatrical productions, vaudeville, concerts, and motion pictures. Also noteworthy was the building's state of preservation and the integrity of its original early to mid 20th century roots.

== Restoration ==
A major part of the Virginia Theatre is its restoration. In December 1999, the Champaign Park District received a $900,000 grant from the State of Illinois to restore the then run-down theatre. Extensive work was done to bring the building up to current code, most of it not visible to the general public. In 2000, the curved movie screen that had been in place for decades was replaced with a smaller screen (50-foot wide viewable image) which can be flown offstage. Additional restrooms were completed in 2001. Box office renovation, dressing room remodeling, and carpet replacement took place in 2002-2003. The east lobby/storefront was remodeled during 2007, and the main lobbies and concession stand were renovated and redecorated in 2010, thanks to a considerable donation from Michael Carragher. The decaying 1930s-era neon marquee was removed from the theatre on November 16, 2010, and it was replaced with a newly designed marquee in September 2011, in spite of opposition from many community members and historic preservation advocates.

== Wurlitzer Theatre Pipe Organ ==
In 1921, the Rudolph Wurlitzer Company installed a theatre organ to provide musical accompaniment for silent films. That 2/8 (two keyboard, eight ranks of pipes) instrument was removed by Buzard Pipe Organ Builders of Champaign in December 2010 for renovation, and it was reinstalled in the fall of 2011.

== Events ==
The Virginia Theatre hosts a wide variety of events throughout the year. Classic films play on the 56-foot-wide screen several nights every month. The theatre is also a popular venue for touring musical acts and comedians. From 1992 until 2010, the Champaign-Urbana Theatre Company, or CUTC, performed plays at the theatre. CUTC once again performs shows starting in 2016. Since 2015, That's What She Said, an annual presentation by The She Said Project, has been a popular event at the theatre providing a spotlight on local women's stories.

== Roger Ebert's Film Festival ==
Every April, from 1999 to 2026 (with the exception of 2020 and 2021), the Theatre is host to Ebertfest: Roger Ebert's Film Festival. Beginning in 1999 as Roger Ebert's Overlooked Film Festival, it has become a very popular event with festival passes selling out well in advance. Founded by Chicago Sun-Times film critic Roger Ebert, the event hosts several less known films as well some popular films. In September 2025, it was announced that the 2025 event marked its final year in Champaign, citing "financial considerations". The announcement did not include specific details about the future of the festival, but said that festival founders "are actively exploring inspired ideas for reinventing Ebertfest".

Following Ebert's death in 2013, organizers in Champaign announced plans to raise $125,000 to build a life-size bronze statue of Roger Ebert in the town. The composition was selected by Ebert's wife Chaz and depicts him sitting in the middle of three theater seats giving his trademark "thumbs up" gesture. The sculpture was unveiled at the 2014 Ebertfest, and sits directly outside the theater.
