= WILL-FM =

- Urbana, Illinois; United States
- Broadcast area: Champaign-Urbana
- Frequency: 90.9 MHz (HD Radio)
- Branding: WILL-FM 90.9 (main program); Illinois Soul (90.9 HD2)

Programming
- Format: Classical music, NPR news
- Subchannels: HD2: Jazz and Rhythm and blues HD3: WILL simulcast (News/Talk)
- Affiliations: NPR

Ownership
- Owner: University of Illinois Urbana-Champaign; (The Board of Trustees of the University of Illinois)
- Sister stations: WILL, WILL-TV

History
- First air date: November 22, 1942; 83 years ago(as WIUC at 42.9)
- Former call signs: WIUC (1941–1954)
- Former frequencies: 42.9 MHz (1941–1947); 91.7 MHz (1947–1954)
- Call sign meaning: ILLinois

Technical information
- Facility ID: 68940
- Class: B (NCE)
- ERP: 105,000 watts
- HAAT: 259 m (850 ft)
- Translators: 106.5 W293AF (Danville); HD2: 101.1 W266AF (Urbana)

Links
- Webcast: Listen live
- Website: will.illinois.edu

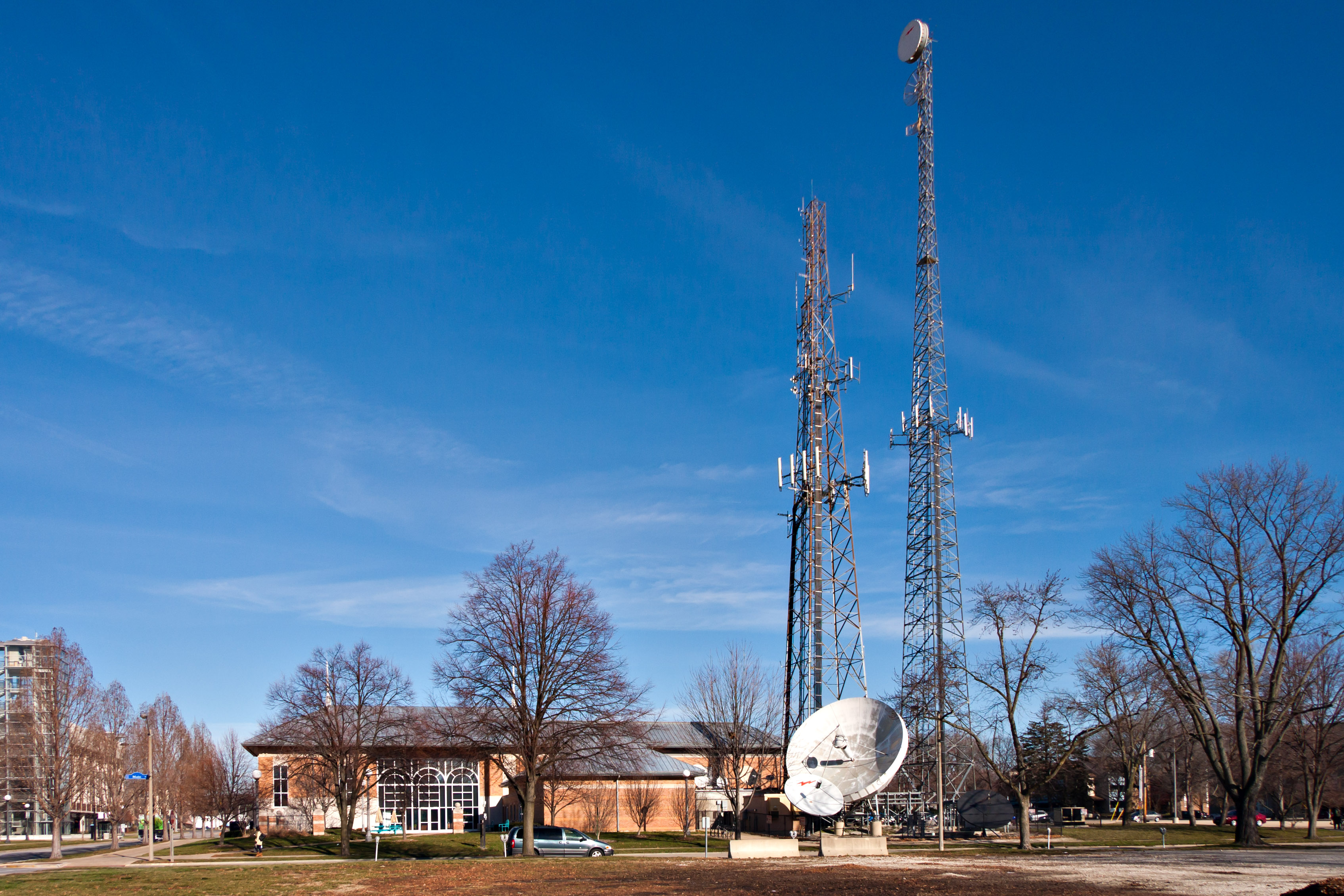
Campbell Hall at the University of Illinois, home of the Illinois Public Media, including the WILL-FM studios

WILL-FM (90.9 MHz) is a public, listener-supported radio station owned by the University of Illinois Urbana-Champaign and licensed to Urbana, Illinois, United States. It is operated by Illinois Public Media, with studios located at Campbell Hall for Public Telecommunications on the university's campus on North Goodwin Avenue on the north side of Urbana. Most of WILL-FM's schedule is classical music with NPR news programs heard in weekday morning and afternoon drive times. Weekends feature classical and other genres of music, including jazz and opera.

WILL-FM dates back to the 1940s. It broadcasts with a grandfathered Effective Radiated Power (ERP) of 105,000 watts, more than double of what would be permitted today in Illinois. The transmitter is co-located with PBS member WILL-TV (channel 12) on East 1700th North Road in Amenia, Illinois, five miles (8 km) west of Monticello. The antenna height above average terrain (HAAT) is 259 meters (850 ft).

== Programming ==
WILL-FM is a member of National Public Radio (NPR) and affiliated with Public Radio International (PRI) and American Public Media (APM). The format is classical music most of the day, but also includes simulcasts along with its AM sister of some of NPR's more popular shows. The primary signal is relayed by FM translator station W293AF at 106.5 MHz in Danville. WILL-FM's HD2 digital subchannel is a 24-hour music stream with the C-24 classical music service, along with WILL-FM's locally produced classical music shows. This programming is relayed by translator station W266AF 101.1 MHz in Urbana, but moved exclusively to a webstream on February 1, 2024. At that time, the station and subchannel adopted a format branded as "Illinois Soul", consisting of a hybrid mix of smooth jazz, neo soul, R&B, and classic hip-hop music, along with African-American hosted NPR programs such as Code Switch and It's Been a Minute and shows hosted by Will Downing and Robert Glasper. WILL-FM's HD3 subchannel simulcasts the programming of WILL (AM), to make up for the reduced coverage that station's nighttime signal.

The Illinois Radio Reader Service, a streaming audio service for the reading impaired, is broadcast over a restricted Subsidiary Communications Authority (SCA) subchannel.

== History ==
In May 1940, the Federal Communications Commission (FCC) authorized the creation of an FM broadcast band, effective January 1, 1941, operating on 40 channels spanning 42–50 MHz, with the first five channels reserved for educational stations.

On July 16, 1941, the university filed an application for a station transmitting with 250 watts on 42.9 MHz. At this time FM broadcasting was in its infancy and few people had receivers. However, the university's existing AM band station, WILL, was restricted to daytime-only operation, so the addition of an FM signal allowed for the expansion of the broadcast service to include nighttime hours. The new FM station was assigned the call letters WIUC, which was said to stand for either "Illinois, Urbana, Champaign" or "Illinois University, Champaign". Following a series of test transmissions, WIUC began regular operations on November 22, 1942, initially with a schedule of 4 to 5:30 p.m. on Monday afternoons. It was the first FM station in the United States licensed to a university. In mid-1945, the station's schedule was reported to be 7 to 10 p.m. on Tuesdays.

In 1945 the FCC announced that, due to interference concerns, it was reallocating the current "low band" FM frequencies to other services, and existing FM stations would be relocated to a new "high band" of 88-106 MHz (later expanded to 108 MHz). In July 1946 the FCC further directed that FM stations currently operating on 42-44 MHz would have to move to new frequencies by the end of the year, and WIUC was reassigned from 42.9 to 44.7 MHz, although the university reported that the station was suspending operations until it was ready to broadcast on its "high band" frequency. WIUC's original "high band" assignment was at 91.7 MHz, and it began operation on this frequency in 1947.

The station call sign was changed to WILL-FM in April 1954. In June 1955, power was increased to 60 kilowatts, estimated to provide a service radius of 20–30 miles (32 to 48 km). The following December 1, now operating on its current frequency of 90.9 MHz, power was increased again, to 300 kilowatts, making the station the country's second highest powered FM broadcaster, and most powerful educational station, with an estimated service radius of 80 to 100 miles (130 to 160 km). In mid-1956 WILL-FM's schedule had expanded to 4 to 10 p.m. Monday through Friday, and 1 to 10 pm. Sunday, simulcasting WILL during daytime hours, and with nighttime programming featuring "classical music, news, sports and feature programs".

WILL-FM was among the stations that helped to create NPR, and was one of the ninety that carried the premiere broadcast of All Things Considered in 1971.

In 1974, WILL-FM began airing a classical music format separate from its AM sister station. In 1978 the Illinois Radio Reader Service, an audio service for the reading impaired, was introduced, broadcast over a WILL-FM subcarrier as a Subsidiary Communications Authority (SCA) transmission that could only be received by persons equipped with a special receiver loaned to qualified individuals. As of 2018 it was estimated that around 300 persons were supplied with the special receivers.

WILL-FM began an HD Radio multicast in July 2008.

== See also ==
- Illini Media - university-independent not-for-profit organization that runs radio station WPGU and the Daily Illini
