= Frederick C. Klein =

American sportswriter (1938–2023)

Frederick C. Klein (February 2, 1938 – December 26, 2023) was an American sportswriter and the author or co-author of 18 books on sports and business. From 1977 to 2001, Klein was the Wall Street Journal's first-ever sports columnist, writing the Journal's twice-weekly sports column, "On Sports".

Klein was born in Chicago and was raised in the city's Ravenswood neighborhood. A multi-sport letterman at Roosevelt High School, he also began writing as a high school student. Klein attended the University of Illinois at Urbana-Champaign and wrote both for the student Daily Illini and for the Champaign-Urbana Courier. Graduating from Illinois in 1959, Klein entered Harvard Law School, but left after a term to pursue journalistic opportunities and graduate work at the University of Michigan.

In 1962, Klein joined the staff of the Pittsburgh Press, and joined the Wall Street Journal's Pittsburgh bureau in 1963, first covering the steel beat. Moving on to the Journal's main office in New York in 1967 and to the Chicago bureau in 1969, Klein increasingly focused on writing some of the newspaper's signature Page One features. Sports became an increasingly frequent topic of his Page 1 items, and in 1977, Klein was named the first-ever sports columnist for the Journal, a role he held into 2001. From 2001 to 2003, Klein was a columnist with Sports Business Journal.

Klein's first book, Education of a Horseplayer, was published in 1968. It was followed in 1974 by News & The Market, written with, which focused on the impact of news on share prices. Later books by Klein included two compilations of his "On Sports" columns, the first being On Sports in 1988 and Sunflower Seeds and Seoul Food in 1992. He also co-wrote several sports-related autobiographies, and his columns were included in anthologies published by the Journal over the years.

In semi-retirement, Klein dedicated his energies to environmental preservation and the publication of the For The Love Of... series of illustrated sports books. The series includes books about Golf, Baseball, the Chicago Cubs, the New York Yankees and the Boston Red Sox.

Klein died on December 26, 2023, at the age of 85.

== See also ==
- List of Jewish American Journalists
