= South Dakota Adventure =

- Genre: educational program
- Starring: Richard Muller
- Country of origin: United States
- No. of seasons: 4
- No. of episodes: 32

Production
- Running time: 15 minutes

Original release
- Network: South Dakota Public Television
- Release: 1980 – 1984

South Dakota Adventure is an educational television series about the state of South Dakota. The program was hosted by Richard Muller and was produced from 1980 to 1984 by South Dakota Public Television. Each of the thirty-two episodes is just under fifteen minutes in length.

== Episode list ==
- 101 South Dakota: Land of Infinite Variety
- 102 Prehistoric Dakota
- 103 Early Indians of South Dakota
- 104 The Sioux Peoples
- 105 Tiyospaye
- 106 Indian Wisdom and Beliefs
- 107 White Culture Arrives in South Dakota
- 108 Louisiana Purchase
- 109 Fur Trading
- 110 The Military Comes to South Dakota
- 111 Early Day Tourists
- 112 Dakota Settlement
- 113 Sioux Nationalism
- 114 The Reservation System
- 115 The Great Dakota Boom
- 116 Black Hills Gold Rush
- 117 Life In and Around the Black Hills
- 118 Territorial Government
- 119 Pioneer Entertainment
- 120 Statehood
- 121 Your State Government
- 122 South Dakota Enters the 20th Century
- 123 The Thirties
- 124 South Dakotans Serve Their Country
- 125 South Dakotans Serve Country -II
- 126 Education
- 127 Conservation and Ecology
- 128 South Dakota's Natural Resources
- 129 Recreation and Tourism
- 130 Famous South Dakotans
- 131 What South Dakota Produces
- 132 South Dakota: Yesterday, Today, Tomorrow
