= WISU =

Radio station at Indiana State University located in Terre Haute, Indiana, U.S.

Coordinates: 39.507°N 87.531°W

- Terre Haute, Indiana; United States
- Broadcast area: Terre Haute, Indiana
- Frequency: 89.7 MHz
- Branding: WISU 89.7 FM

Programming
- Format: Public radio
- Affiliations: National Public Radio (since 2014)

Ownership
- Owner: Indiana State University

History
- First air date: 1964
- Call sign meaning: W Indiana State University

Technical information
- Facility ID: 28603
- Class: B
- ERP: 13,500 watts
- HAAT: 156 meters (512 ft)

WISU is a non-commercial, educational radio station licensed to Indiana State University in Terre Haute, Indiana, United States. The station operates on the assigned FM frequency of 89.7 MHz with an effective radiated power of 13,500 watts. The studios are located in Dreiser Hall on the ISU campus on North 6th Street. The tower and transmitter facilities are located on Country Road in West Terre Haute, Indiana. Under the personal supervision of the "Hoosier Schoolmaster of the Air," Dr. Clarence M. Morgan, who with his son Dr. Thomas O. Morgan helped build the station, WISU began broadcasting on April 1, 1964. WISU is licensed by the U.S. Federal Communications Commission as a Class B FM station, which would allow a maximum power of 46,000 watts effective radiated power (ERP), using an antenna height of 156 meters.

== Programming ==
The original program schedule of student created live broadcasts is well documented in the annual reports written by Dr. Clarence M. Morgan, the Director of Radio Activities at Indiana State College, from 1934 to 1969, when he retired.

In 2014, WISU began carrying NPR and local programming in collaboration with WFYI in Indianapolis. Previously, Terre Haute had received NPR programming from WILL (AM) in Urbana, Illinois and a translator of WFIU in Bloomington, Indiana.

== Notable former staff ==
- Todd Clem (Bubba The Love Sponge)
