= KESD (FM) =

Coordinates: 44.3361°N 97.2284°W

- Brookings, South Dakota; United States
- Frequency: 88.3 MHz (HD radio)

Programming
- Format: Public radio; News/talk, jazz, AAA
- Subchannels: HD2: Classical
- Affiliations: NPR; Public Radio International; American Public Media

Ownership
- Owner: South Dakota Bureau of Information and Telecommunication; (South Dakota Board of Directors for Educational Telecommunication)

Technical information
- Licensing authority: FCC
- Facility ID: 58359
- Class: C1
- ERP: 50,000 watts
- HAAT: 190 meters (620 ft)

Links
- Public license information: Public file; LMS
- Webcast: Listen live
- Website: sdpb.org

KESD (88.3 FM) is a radio station licensed to Brookings, South Dakota. The station is owned by the South Dakota Bureau of Information and Telecommunication, and is an affiliate of South Dakota Public Broadcasting's radio network.

== Translators ==
| Call sign | Frequency | City of license | FID | ERP (W) | FCC info |
|---|---|---|---|---|---|
| K217CE | 91.3 FM | Huron, South Dakota | 58360 | 7 watts | LMS |
