= KUSD (AM) =

Vermillion, South Dakota; United States
- Frequency: 690 kHz

Ownership
- Owner: University of South Dakota

History
- First air date: May 20, 1922
- Last air date: December 20, 1992
- Former call signs: WEAJ (1922–1925)
- Call sign meaning: University of South Dakota

Technical information
- Facility ID: 62408
- Class: D
- Power: 1,000 watts (day); 21 watts (night)

KUSD was a non-commercial educational radio station in Vermillion, South Dakota, United States, licensed to the University of South Dakota (USD) from 1922 until 1992. It was deleted two years later after the university decided not to replace a transmission tower that had fallen and shuttered the station. At the time of its deletion, KUSD was the oldest broadcasting station in the state of South Dakota; it was the predecessor to the present radio service of South Dakota Public Broadcasting.

== History ==
In December 1921, the university was issued a license for a "Technical and Training School" station, 9YAM. A then-current student and future winner of the Nobel Prize in Physics, Ernest Lawrence, was made responsible for station operations and built the transmitter.

Originally there were no formal standards about which stations could make broadcasts intended for the general public, and stations under a variety of license classifications began broadcasting. On December 1, 1921, the U.S. Department of Commerce, which regulated radio at the time, adopted a regulation establishing a broadcasting station category, which set aside the wavelength of 360 meters (833 kHz) for entertainment broadcasts, and 485 meters (619 kHz) for market and weather reports.

On May 26, 1922, a telegram was sent to the University of South Dakota, authorizing a broadcasting station, with the sequentially assigned call letters WEAJ and operating on the 360 meter "entertainment" wavelength, although KUSD traditionally traces its start to May 20, 1922. (Note: Prior to a January 1923 boundary shift to the Mississippi River, stations in South Dakota received call signs starting with "W". Afterward, they received call letters starting with "K".)

In late 1923, the station was reassigned to 1060 kHz, which was changed a year later to 1080 kHz. By this time, programs included concerts and basketball games. The call letters were changed to KUSD in October 1925. (The KUSD call sign had been previously assigned to the steamer City of Honolulu, which caught fire and sank in October 1922.) That same year, it was shut down for two weeks for rebuilding and to connect it with the new auditorium on the USD campus; it emerged as the first 250-watt outlet in the state. In June 1927, KUSD moved to 620 kHz, and on November 11, 1928, with the implementation of the Federal Radio Commission's General Order 40, it was assigned to 890 kHz, on a timesharing basis with KFNF in Shenandoah, Iowa, and WILL in Urbana, Illinois. Broadcasting for a total of 3 1/2 hours a week, it aired lectures, concerts, and even a course in conversational Spanish. Football games were also aired; for instance, one game between South Dakota and North Dakota, reproduced by the station on the basis of wire reports, also featured the normal KUSD program—including a talk on "The Young Victor Hugo" at halftime.

In 1936, KUSD was reported to be allocated 1/8th time on its shared frequency, with a regular schedule of two hours on Monday, Wednesday and Friday, and one hour on Sunday, Tuesday and Thursday, for an annual total of 350 hours. In 1937, WILL moved to a new frequency, which meant that KUSD was now timesharing with only KFNF. On March 29, 1941, with the implementation of the North American Regional Broadcasting Agreement, stations on 890 kHz, including KUSD and KFNF, moved to 920 kHz.

In 1952, KUSD moved to 690 kHz using a newly constructed two-tower directional antenna north of Vermillion, with the station now limited to daytime-only operation. However, this represented a significant expansion in output, as the station went from broadcasting for just three hours a day to operating from 9:30 a.m. to sunset. The KUSD School of the Air, with its educational programming, served 1,000 schools in South Dakota, Minnesota, Iowa, and Nebraska, and its output was also broadcast over 12 commercial radio stations. A companion FM station was built, KUSD-FM, which simulcast the AM station and carried additional programming from sunset until midnight. The AM station later added a restricted nighttime operation with only 20.6 watts. The KUSD stations joined NPR at its launch in 1971; KUSD-FM upgraded from a 10-watt station to 50,000 watts in 1975, giving it regional coverage and allowing for some split programming between AM and FM. KUSD-TV, the first transmitter in the South Dakota Public Broadcasting television service, was established in 1961.

In 1992, damage to guy wires holding up one of the KUSD AM transmitter towers caused it to collapse. South Dakota Public Broadcasting directed the replacement of the fallen mast, but instead of replacing the felled tower, it was decided to end operations of the AM station, and on August 11, 1994, KUSD's license was deleted by the Federal Communications Commission (FCC). At the time of its deletion, it was the oldest station in the state. The other tower was removed in 1998.

== See also ==
- List of initial AM-band station grants in the United States
