= Pringle, South Dakota =

- Town
- Location in Custer County and the state of South Dakota
- Coordinates: 43°36′32″N 103°35′40″W
- Country: United States
- State: South Dakota
- County: Custer

Area
  - Total: 0.24 sq mi (0.63 km^{2})
  - Land: 0.24 sq mi (0.63 km^{2})
  - Water: 0 sq mi (0.00 km^{2})
- Elevation: 4,912 ft (1,497 m)

Population (2020)
  - Total: 109
  - Density: 449.5/sq mi (173.56/km^{2})
- Time zone: UTC-7 (MST)
  - Summer (DST): UTC-6 (MDT)
- Zip Code: 57773
- Area code: 605
- FIPS code: 46-51940
- GNIS feature ID: 1267538

Pringle is a town in Custer County, South Dakota, United States. The population was 109 at the 2020 census.

The town is named for W. H. Pringle, a cattleman who lived in the area.

== Geography ==
Pringle got its start as a stage stop on the Sidney-Custer Trail. Operated by Henry Pringle, it was called the Point of Rocks Stage Station, named after a prominent and distinct granite outcropping located due east of the current town.

The Sidney-Custer Trail was an important route into the southern Black Hills from Nebraska, and The Point of Rocks Station also served traffic between Cheyenne, Wyoming and Custer.

A small settlement, also called Point of Rocks, soon developed around the stage station. In 1890, the Chicago, Burlington, and Quincy Railroad track reached the settlement, at which time the town's name was changed to Pringle, named after Anna Carr Pringle, who provided hospitality to the railroad crews when they came through town. The settlement soon boasted a railroad depot and two stores.

Pringle is most famous as the home of a housing complex devoted to the Fundamentalist Church of Jesus Christ of Latter Day Saints. The development continues to grow and spark controversy in the area.

According to the United States Census Bureau, the town has a total area of 0.24 square miles (0.62 km^{2}), all land.

== Demographics ==
Historical population
Census	Pop.	Note	%±
1940	273		—
1950	193		−29.3%
1960	145		−24.9%
1970	86		−40.7%
1980	105		22.1%
1990	96		−8.6%
2000	125		30.2%
2010	112		−10.4%
2020	109		−2.7%
U.S. Decennial Census

=== 2010 census ===
As of the census of 2010, there were 112 people, 54 households, and 31 families living in the town. The population density was 466.7 inhabitants per square mile (180.2/km^{2}). There were 68 housing units at an average density of 283.3 per square mile (109.4/km^{2}). The racial makeup of the town was 93.8% White, 2.7% Native American, 1.8% from other races, and 1.8% from two or more races. Hispanic or Latino of any race were 3.6% of the population.

There were 54 households, of which 18.5% had children under the age of 18 living with them, 50.0% were married couples living together, 7.4% had a male householder with no wife present, and 42.6% were non-families. 33.3% of all households were made up of individuals, and 9.3% had someone living alone who was 65 years of age or older. The average household size was 2.07 and the average family size was 2.65.

The median age in the town was 45.5 years. 17% of residents were under the age of 18; 4.6% were between the ages of 18 and 24; 26.8% were from 25 to 44; 37.5% were from 45 to 64; and 14.3% were 65 years of age or older. The gender makeup of the town was 52.7% male and 47.3% female.

=== 2000 census ===
As of the census of 2000, there were 125 people, 46 households, and 36 families living in the town. The population density was 501.8 inhabitants per square mile (193.7/km^{2}). There were 64 housing units at an average density of 256.9 per square mile (99.2/km^{2}). The racial makeup of the town was 92.80% White, 2.40% Native American, 0.80% from other races, and 4.00% from two or more races. Hispanic or Latino of any race were 0.80% of the population.

There were 46 households, out of which 34.8% had children under the age of 18 living with them, 67.4% were married couples living together, 8.7% had a female householder with no husband present, and 21.7% were non-families. 19.6% of all households were made up of individuals, and 13.0% had someone living alone who was 65 years of age or older. The average household size was 2.72 and the average family size was 2.89.

In the town, the population was spread out, with 25.6% under the age of 18, 8.8% from 18 to 24, 29.6% from 25 to 44, 23.2% from 45 to 64, and 12.8% who were 65 years of age or older. The median age was 38 years. For every 100 females, there were 111.9 males. For every 100 females age 18 and over, there were 93.8 males.

The median income for a household in the town was $28,214, and the median income for a family was $28,571. Males had a median income of $25,625 versus $15,625 for females. The per capita income for the town was $10,584. There were 8.8% of families and 16.8% of the population living below the poverty line, including 7.1% of under eighteens and none of those over 64.
