= South Dakota Public Broadcasting =

Public radio and TV network in South Dakota

- SDPB Logo adopted February 29, 2024
- statewide South Dakota; United States
- Channels: Digital: See below
- Branding: SDPB

Programming
- Affiliations: Television: PBS (1970–present); Radio: NPR, APM, PRX, BBCWS

Ownership
- Owner: South Dakota Bureau of Information and Technology; (South Dakota Board of Directors for Educational Telecommunications)

History
- First air date: Radio: May 29, 1922; Television: July 5, 1961
- Former affiliations: NET (1961–1970)
- Call sign meaning: See below

Links
- Website: www.sdpb.org

South Dakota Public Broadcasting (SDPB) is a network of non-commercial educational television and radio stations serving the U.S. state of South Dakota. The stations are operated by the South Dakota Bureau of Information and Technology, an agency of the state government which holds the licenses for all PBS and NPR member stations licensed in South Dakota except KRSD in Sioux Falls, which is owned and run by Minnesota Public Radio, and KAUR in Sioux Falls, which is owned by Augustana University and operated by MPR. SDPB has studios and offices on Main Street in Rapid City and on North Phillips Avenue in downtown Sioux Falls, with headquarters located in the Al Neuharth Media Center on the campus of the University of South Dakota on North Dakota Street in Vermillion.

== History ==
Educational broadcasting in South Dakota began in 1919 with experimental broadcasts at USD's College of Engineering. USD was granted a full license in 1922, and went on the air that May 29 as WEAJ. It became KUSD in 1925. By 1952, the station settled at 690 AM at 1,000 watts, operating only during daylight hours to protect CBF in Montreal. In 1967, it acquired an FM sister station, KUSD-FM at 89.7. Also in 1967, South Dakota State University in Brookings signed on KESD-FM. The three stations merged in 1982 as South Dakota Public Radio.

On July 5, 1961, KUSD-TV signed on the air as the state's first educational television station. Seven more stations signed on from 1967 to 1975, extending the network's reach to parts of Minnesota and Iowa. The network's name changed from South Dakota ETV to South Dakota Public Television in 1970.

In 1985, South Dakota Public Radio merged with South Dakota Public Television to form South Dakota Public Broadcasting. Ownership of the licenses was transferred from the individual universities to the State Board of Directors for Educational Telecommunications (ET Board). As a part of state government SDPB operates within the Bureau of Information and Technology. Between 1985 and 1991, five other stations joined the radio network. One of them was KCSD, which signed on in 1985 as part of a partnership between Sioux Falls College (now the University of Sioux Falls) and the ET Board in to improve the network's reception in South Dakota's largest city. Until 2013, KCSD's license was held by the University of Sioux Falls and operated by the state network under a management agreement. The network bought KCSD outright in 2013.

In 1992, a Chevrolet Suburban went on a joyride through the Vermillion Golf Course, where KUSD (AM)'s towers were located. The Suburban crashed into one of the AM station's towers and knocked it down. While a judge ordered the suspect to pay $48,000, the insurance settlement was not large enough to restore full operations, and KUSD (AM) went off the air for good in 1994.

KUSD-TV's signal had long been spotty in parts of Sioux Falls, even though the channel 2 analog signal traveled a very long distance under normal conditions. Some parts of the area didn't get a clear signal from KUSD-TV until cable gained more penetration in the 1980s. To solve this problem, KCSD-TV signed on in 1995, significantly improving coverage in the state's largest city.

As of February 2017, SDPB now broadcasts the main network over the fifth digital subchannel of the SDPB Television stations, and classical music (which airs on the radio stations' second HD channel) on the television stations' sixth digital subchannel.

== Radio stations ==
SDPB airs a mix of news and talk from NPR, Public Radio Exchange (PRX), American Public Media (APM), the BBC World Service and other sources. Stations in the lineup include:

Call sign	Frequency (MHz)	City of license	Facility ID	ERP (W)	Height (m (ft))
KESD	88.3	Brookings	58359	50,000	190 m (620 ft)
KPSD-FM	97.1	Faith	62385	100,000	465 m (1,526 ft)
KQSD-FM	91.9	Lowry	58325	100,000	270 m (890 ft)
KZSD-FM	102.5	Martin	59466	100,000	230 m (750 ft)
KWSD	89.1	Mitchell	762343	14,500	59 m (194 ft)
KDSD-FM	90.9	Pierpont	58324	70,000	323.1 m (1,060 ft)
KBHE-FM	89.3	Rapid City	58327	9,800	125 m (410 ft)
KTSD-FM	91.1	Reliance	58326	100,000	451 m (1,480 ft)
KCSD	90.9	Sioux Falls	60485	6,000	80 m (260 ft)
KYSD	91.9	Spearfish	174496	6,000	−28.6 m (−94 ft)
KUSD (Note: Flagship station)	89.7	Vermillion	58426	32,000	202 m (663 ft)
KJSD	90.3	Watertown	171810	10,500	175.2 m (575 ft)

Notes:

SDPB also rebroadcasts on the following translator stations:

Call sign	Frequency (MHz)	City of license	Facility ID
K219CM	91.7	Aberdeen	58385
K201AP	88.1	Belle Fourche	62384
K214BN	90.7	Edgemont	62400
K201AQ	88.1	Hot Springs	62386
K217CE	91.3	Huron	58360
K204GC	88.7	Lead	62445
K215AI	90.9	Mitchell	62102
K242CH	96.3	Pierre	58386
K203BN	88.5	Pringle	62403

In March 2007, then South Dakota Public Radio started broadcasting with HD Radio.

== Television stations ==
Television stations included in the state network are:

Station	City of license	Channels	First air date	Call letters' meaning	ERP	HAAT	FCC Facility ID	Transmitter coordinates	Public license information
KUSD-TV	Vermillion (Yankton)	Digital: 34 (UHF); Virtual: 2	July 5, 1961	University of South Dakota	236 kW	204 m (669 ft)	61072	43°3′1.4″N 96°47′2.3″W	Public file LMS
KBHE-TV	Rapid City	Digital: 26 (UHF); Virtual: 9	September 13, 1967	Black Hills	76.3 kW	191.7 m (629 ft)	61068	44°3′6.5″N 103°14′38.9″W	Public file LMS
KESD-TV	Brookings (Watertown)	Digital: 8 (VHF); Virtual: 8	February 4, 1968		15 kW	229 m (751 ft)	61067	44°20′16.2″N 97°13′42.1″W	Public file LMS
KTSD-TV	Pierre	Digital: 10 (VHF); Virtual: 10	August 1, 1970		54.7 kW	487.7 m (1,600 ft)	61066	43°58′6.3″N 99°35′41.3″W	Public file LMS
KDSD-TV	Aberdeen	Digital: 17 (UHF); Virtual: 16	January 1, 1972		19 kW	349 m (1,145 ft)	61064	45°29′54″N 97°40′28.9″W	Public file LMS
KPSD-TV^{1}	Eagle Butte (North Eagle Butte–Faith)	Digital: 13 (VHF); Virtual: 13	September 16, 1973		27 kW	516 m (1,693 ft)	61071	45°3′13.6″N 102°15′48.6″W	Public file LMS
KQSD-TV	Lowry (Selby–Java–Mobridge)	Digital: 11 (VHF); Virtual: 11	March 9, 1976		37 kW	312.7 m (1,026 ft)	61063	45°16′37.1″N 99°59′11.2″W	Public file LMS
KZSD-TV	Martin	Digital: 8 (VHF); Virtual: 8	February 9, 1978		44.7 kW	266 m (873 ft)	61062	43°25′59.7″N 101°33′19.1″W	Public file LMS
KCSD-TV	Sioux Falls	Digital: 24 (UHF); Virtual: 23	June 13, 1995		29 kW	75 m (246 ft)	60728	43°34′29.2″N 96°39′19.3″W	Public file LMS

Notes:

- 1. KPSD-TV used the callsign KLGC during its construction permit from June 6 to August 28, 1973.

=== Translators ===
The television programming from SDPB is also rebroadcast on the following low-power translators, using the same virtual channel numbers as their parent stations:

City of license	Callsign	Translating	Channel	ERP	HAAT	Facility ID	Transmitter coordinates
Belle Fourche	K19CG-D	KPSD-TV	19	0.007 kW	3 m (10 ft)	59462	44°39′23.9″N 103°50′50.7″W
Edgemont	K15IZ-D	KBHE-TV	15	0.03 kW	155 m (509 ft)	187639	43°22′08.9″N 103°44′08.7″W
Pine Ridge	K10PS-D	KZSD-TV	10	0.03 kW	−33 m (−108 ft)	168678	43°00′57.9″N 102°34′20.5″W
Pringle	K36NX-D	KBHE-TV	36	4.346 kW	385 m (1,263 ft)	187640	43°44′43.0″N 103°28′52.0″W
Spearfish	K04GW-D	KPSD-TV	4	0.028 kW	129 m (423 ft)	59455	44°29′33.0″N 103°50′07.0″W
Wagner	K08PM-D	KUSD-TV	8	0.03 kW	132 m (433 ft)	187638	43°11′21″N 98°04′17.0″W

=== Digital television ===
==== Subchannels ====
The signals of SDPB's TV stations are multiplexed:

SDPB multiplex
Channel	Res.	Short name	Programming
x.1	720p	SDPB-1	PBS
x.2	720p	SDPB-2	World
x.3	720p	SDPB-3	Create
x.4	720p	SDPB-4	PBS Kids
x.5	Audio only	SDPB-5	SDPB Radio audio
x.6	Audio only	SDPB-6	SDPB Classical HD2 network audio

==== Analog-to-digital conversion ====
During 2009, in the lead-up to the analog-to-digital television transition that would ultimately occur on June 12, SDPB shut down the analog transmitters of its stations on a staggered basis. Listed below are the dates each analog transmitter ceased operations as well as their post-transition channel allocations:

- KUSD-TV shut down its analog signal, over VHF channel 2, on February 17, 2009, the original date on which full-power television stations in the United States were to transition from analog to digital broadcasts under federal mandate (which was later pushed back to June 12, 2009). The station's digital signal remained on its pre-transition UHF channel 34, using virtual channel 2.
- KBHE-TV shut down its analog signal, over VHF channel 9, on February 17, 2009. The station's digital signal remained on its pre-transition UHF channel 26, using virtual channel 9.
- KCSD-TV shut down its analog signal, over UHF channel 23, on February 17, 2009. The station's digital signal remained on its pre-transition UHF channel 24, using virtual channel 23.
- KDSD-TV shut down its analog signal, over UHF channel 16, on February 17, 2009. The station's digital signal remained on its pre-transition UHF channel 17, using virtual channel 16.
- KESD-TV shut down its analog signal, over VHF channel 8, on February 17, 2009. The station's digital signal relocated from its pre-transition UHF channel 18 to VHF channel 8 for post-transition operations.
- KPSD-TV shut down its analog signal, over VHF channel 13, on June 12, 2009, the official date on which full-power television stations in the United States transitioned from analog to digital broadcasts under federal mandate. The station's digital signal relocated from its pre-transition UHF channel 25 to VHF channel 13 for post-transition operations.
- KQSD-TV shut down its analog signal, over VHF channel 11, on February 17, 2009. The station's digital signal relocated from its pre-transition UHF channel 15 to VHF channel 11 for post-transition operations.
- KTSD-TV shut down its analog signal, over VHF channel 10, on February 17, 2009. The station's digital signal relocated from its pre-transition UHF channel 21 to VHF channel 10 for post-transition operations.
- KZSD-TV shut down its analog signal, over VHF channel 8, on February 17, 2009. The station's digital signal relocated from its pre-transition UHF channel 23 to VHF channel 8 for post-transition operations.

== Programming ==
Although SDPB provides PBS programming, it also produces original programs such as:

- Dakota Life — a magazine show focusing on South Dakota life.
- A Falconer's Memoir (2000)
- Images of the Past — a series about South Dakota's history as documented in photographs, film, and video.
- Kids' Quest — an educational series for students.
- Nature Adventures — a series about wildlife in South Dakota.
- No Cover No Minimum — a series showing live performances of South Dakota music groups and solo acts such as Big Head Todd and the Monsters, Judd Hoos, and Chancey Williams and the Younger Brothers Band.
- On Call Television — a show which discusses medical topics.
- South Dakota Focus — a panel discussion show.
- Statehouse — a show which focuses on the South Dakota State Legislature.

SDPB has also produced educational programs, such as:

- The Badlands: Nature's Time Capsule — a multimedia project about Badlands National Park.
- By The People, For The People — a series about government in South Dakota.
- Dakota Pathways — a series about the history of South Dakota.
- Draw With Me with Diana Tollefson — a South Dakota educational series about art.
- Infinite Variety — a series about the geography and environment of South Dakota.
- Our Statehouse: A Capitol Idea — a multimedia project about the history of the South Dakota Capitol.
- South Dakota Adventure — a series about the history and culture of South Dakota.

SDPB has also syndicated educational programs, such as:

- Once Upon a Time — a children's show produced by Nebraska ETV in the 1980s which focused on children's reading.
