= Roy J. Harris =

American journalist

Roy J. Harris (1902–1980) was an American journalist, an investigative reporter whose work was rewarded with the 1950 Pulitzer Prize for Public Service.

== Early life and education ==
Harris received a bachelor of arts in journalism in 1925 from the University of Illinois Urbana-Champaign.

== Journalism career ==
The 1950 Pulitzer Prize for Public Service was awarded "[f]or the work of George Thiem and Roy J. Harris, respectively, in exposing the presence of 37 Illinois newspapermen on an Illinois State payroll."
