= Women in Law and Litigation =

Women in Law and Litigation (WILL) was formed by women lawyers, judges and legal professionals to deal with gender discrimination faced by women in the field of law. The litigating public prefers to deal with male lawyers than women lawyers against gender discrimination.

== History ==
The society was formed on 6 September 2014 under the supervision of Supreme Court of India and the justice of Supreme Court of India, Ranjana Desai.

== Purpose and activities ==
WILL was formed to provide professional support, advocacy skills, and a platform for discussion on ways for development of women lawyers. Justice Hima Kohli of the High Court (Delhi) defined WILL as the society would be a "way to give back to the system for senior lawyers and legal practitioners who have "reached high positions".
