= Herb Keinon =

American-born Israeli journalist

Herb Keinon (Hebrew: הרב קינון) is an American-born Israeli journalist and columnist for The Jerusalem Post. Since 2000 he has served as the publication's diplomatic correspondent and analyst. Keinon is often invited to speak on issues concerning Israeli society, security and Middle Eastern politics.

== Biography ==
Herb Keinon was born in Denver. He earned a Bachelor of Arts in political science from the University of Colorado Boulder, and a Master of Arts in journalism from the University of Illinois Urbana-Champaign. He lives in Ma'ale Adumim with his wife and four children.

== Publications ==
- Keinon, Herb (2012). LONE SOLDIERS: Israel's Defenders from Around the World. Devora Publishing. ISBN 978-965-524-116-7.
- Keinon, Herb (2014). French Fries in Pita: A Collection of Herb Keinon's Columns on Life in Israel. CreateSpace. ISBN 978-1496089519.
