= Prairie Fire (TV program) =

- Genre: Television news magazine
- Opening theme: Local Color by Zero Rain
- Ending theme: B Minor by Lanterna
- Country of origin: United States
- Original language: English
- No. of seasons: 15

Production
- Executive producer: Henry Szujewski
- Producer: Alison Davis Wood
- Production location: Urbana, Illinois

Original release
- Network: WILL-TV
- Release: April 9, 1992 – April 15, 2010

Prairie Fire was a United States television news magazine focusing on Central Illinois. It was produced by WILL-TV, a public broadcasting station owned by the University of Illinois at Urbana-Champaign. One of the longest-running local TV programs in central Illinois, it last aired in 2010.
