= WILL-TV =

Television station in Urbana, Illinois

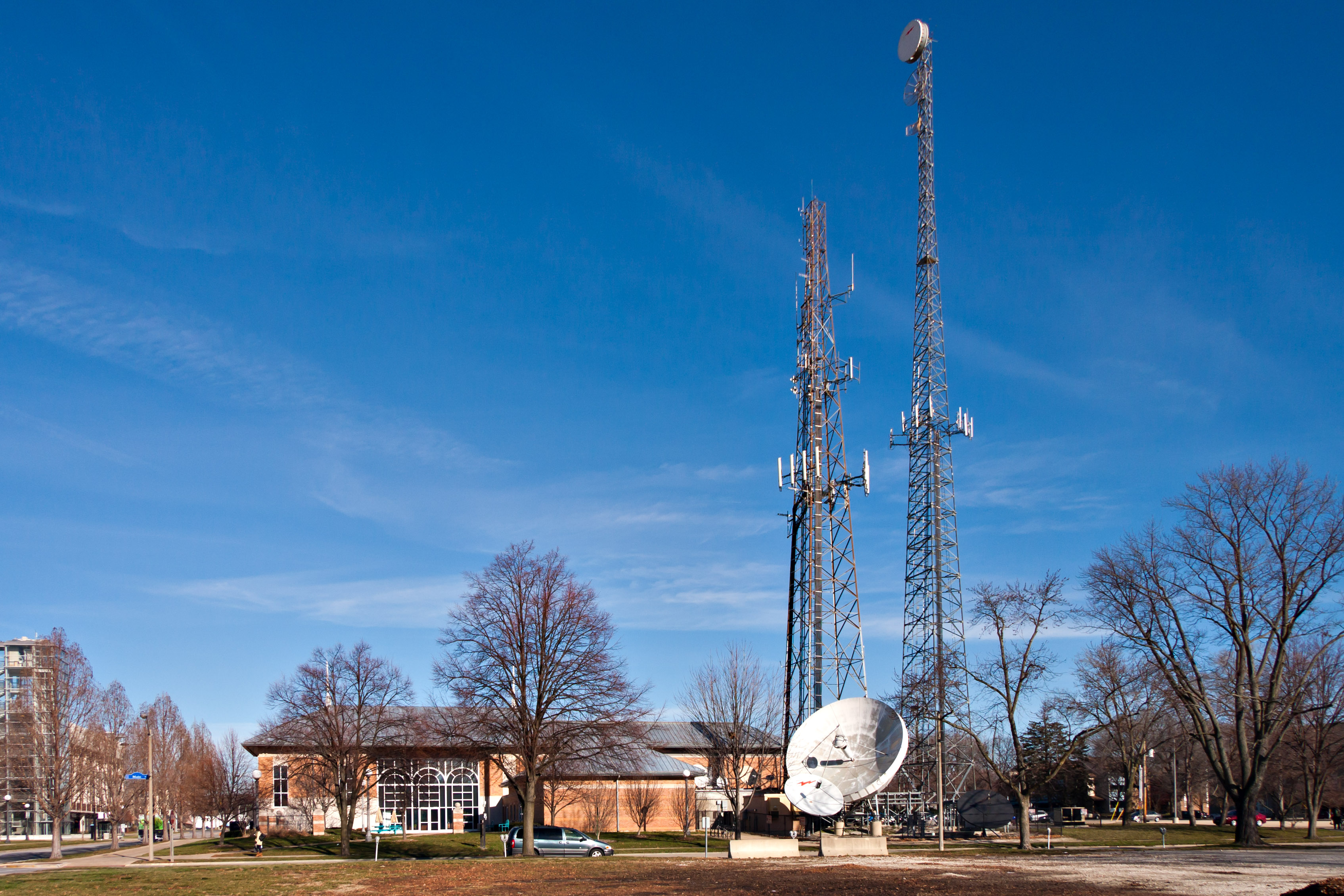
- Campbell Hall at the University of Illinois, home of Illinois Public Media, including the WILL-TV studios.
- Urbana–Champaign, Illinois; United States
- City: Urbana, Illinois
- Channels: Digital: 9 (VHF); Virtual: 12
- Branding: PBS WILL

Programming
- Affiliations: 12.1: PBS; 12.2: PBS Kids; 12.3: Create/World

Ownership
- Owner: University of Illinois Urbana-Champaign; (The Board of Trustees of the University of Illinois)
- Sister stations: WILL, WILL-FM

History
- First air date: August 1, 1955
- Former call signs: WTLC (CP, 1953–1955)
- Former channel numbers: Analog: 12 (VHF, 1955–2009)
- Former affiliations: NET (1955–1970)
- Call sign meaning: Illinois or the word "will"

Technical information
- Licensing authority: FCC
- Facility ID: 68939
- ERP: 30 kW
- HAAT: 302 m (991 ft)
- Transmitter coordinates: 40°2′18″N 88°40′10″W

Links
- Public license information: Public file; LMS
- Website: will.illinois.edu

WILL-TV (channel 12) is a PBS member television station licensed to Urbana, Illinois, United States, serving the Central Illinois region. Owned by the University of Illinois Urbana-Champaign as part of Illinois Public Media, it is sister to NPR member stations WILL (580 AM) and WILL-FM (90.9). The three stations share studios at Campbell Hall for Public Telecommunication on the university's campus on North Goodwin Avenue on the north side of Urbana; WILL-TV and WILL-FM share transmitter facilities on East 1700th Road North, five miles (8 km) west of Monticello.

== History ==
Commercial television operation in the United States was first authorized in 1941. However, by 1948, the Federal Communications Commission (FCC) determined that insufficient channels had been created to provide for national interference-free coverage, and there was also a need to set aside allocations for use by non-commercial educational stations. In order to give itself time to review options, a "freeze" on new TV station construction was announced, which would last until 1952. Meanwhile, in May 1951, the Illinois General Assembly included funding for a University of Illinois TV program-production unit.

In 1952, the FCC announced a new TV allocation plan, which included a reservation for an educational station in Urbana on VHF channel 12. At this time the FCC also announced the creation of 70 UHF TV channels; however, existing receivers could only receive VHF stations, and UHF assignments were considered to be uneconomical for commercial operation. In particular, the Illinois Broadcasters Association complained that the Urbana channel 12 assignment was the only VHF channel allocation in south central Illinois; moreover, that the university should not operate its own TV station, and should only prepare programming for use by commercial stations. There were also petitions filed with the FCC to modify the Urbana educational channel 12 allocation; however, the commission left this assignment unchanged.

In November 1953, the university filed an application to build the new station. After a bill that would have forced the university to withdraw its application was narrowly defeated in the legislature, the Illinois Broadcasters Association funded a taxpayer's lawsuit filed by Evanston restaurant owner Stephen Turkovich, that claimed financial support for the station violated provisions of the state's 1955 Finance Act. The case ultimately went to the Illinois Supreme Court, which in 1957 ruled that the state financing was proper.

Because the station's initial application listed a main studio location in Champaign, regulations at the time meant it could not be assigned the call sign WILL-TV, because sister station WILL was licensed to a different community, Urbana. Thus when the application was approved and a construction permit issued, the TV station was initially issued the call sign WTLC. However, in March 1955, prior to commencing operations, the main studio location was changed to Urbana, which allowed the call sign to be changed to WILL-TV.

WILL-TV inaugurated broadcasting on August 1, 1955, from makeshift studios underneath the west stands of Memorial Stadium. Financial support included a transmitter donated by General Electric, and $100,000 from an independent Ford Foundation agency, the Fund for Adult Education. Originally airing for only a few hours at night, the station began daytime broadcasts in 1958, consisting of telecourses from the university. Also aired during this era was news, documentaries, and children's programming.

WILL-TV became an affiliate of PBS upon the network's formation. The station added Saturday programming in 1974, four years after joining PBS.

== Programming ==
In addition to PBS network and local programming, WILL-TV carries PBS Kids on one digital subchannel, and a mixture of programming from the Create and World networks on a second subchannel.

== Technical information ==
=== Subchannels ===
The station's signal is multiplexed:

Subchannels of WILL-TV
Channel	Res.	Short name	Programming
12.1	1080i	WILL-HD	PBS
12.2	480i	Kids	PBS Kids
12.3	480i	Create	Create (5 a.m.–5 p.m.); World (5 p.m.–5 a.m.)

=== Analog-to-digital conversion ===
WILL-TV shut down its analog signal on VHF channel 12 on June 12, 2009, the official date when full-power television stations in the United States transitioned from analog to digital broadcasts under federal mandate. The station's digital signal remained on its pre-transition VHF channel 9, using virtual channel 12.

== See also ==
- Prairie Fire – a 15+ season running television news magazine and documentary program produced by WILL-TV
