= WPGU =

Student radio station at the University of Illinois at Urbana–Champaign

- Urbana, Illinois; United States
- Broadcast area: Champaign–Urbana
- Frequency: 107.1 MHz
- Branding: WPGU 107.1

Programming
- Format: Alternative

Ownership
- Owner: Illini Media Company

History
- First air date: December 3, 1953; 72 years ago on carrier current AM 640; April 17, 1967; 59 years ago on FM radio
- Call sign meaning: Parade Ground Units

Technical information
- Licensing authority: FCC
- Facility ID: 28283
- Class: A
- ERP: 3,000 watts
- HAAT: 72 meters (236 ft)
- Transmitter coordinates: 40°06′34.0″N 88°14′6.0″W

Links
- Public license information: Public file; LMS
- Webcast: Listen live
- Website: wpgu.com

WPGU (107.1 FM) is a fully commercial, student-run college radio station on the campus of the University of Illinois Urbana-Champaign in Champaign, Illinois. It broadcasts an alternative rock radio format and other programming throughout Champaign-Urbana and surrounding communities. It is owned independently from the university by the Illini Media Company.

WPGU has an effective radiated power (ERP) of 3,000 watts. The transmitter is atop the Tower at Third apartment complex on South 3rd Street in Champaign.

== History ==
=== Early years ===
WPGU is named for the "Parade Ground Units", where the station was originally located on the university campus. The units were Quonset huts, used to house soldiers returning from World War II, while getting training at the university.

When the Parade Ground Units were demolished in the early 1960s to make room for regular dormitories, WPGU moved into the basement of Weston Hall. It remained there until 1995, when the station moved off-campus to 52 E. Green Street in Champaign, a few blocks from where its tower is currently located. In 2006, WPGU along with the other Illini Media outlets (Daily Illini newspaper, Technograph engineering journal, Illio yearbook) moved to a new building at 512 E. Green Street, Champaign. In 2018, the WPGU station moved to the basement of the campus YMCA building at 1001 S. Wright Street, Champaign, and is currently there.

=== Carrier current and FM ===
WPGU began as an experimental radio station by engineering students at the University of Illinois. It was not broadcast over the air, but sent its signal via carrier AM into the dorms and other campus buildings. If a radio was plugged into an electrical outlet, WPGU showed up on 640 AM. After an initial technical problem, WPGU signed on for three hours on December 7, 1953. It played an hour of jazz, an hour of classical music and an hour of news. In 1964, WPGU joined the Illini Publishing Company (forerunner of the Illini Media Company) and procured a Federal Communications Commission (FCC) construction permit for a new FM station. FM broadcasting began on April 17, 1967.

WPGU started broadcasting in FM stereo, with student disc jockey Ted LeBlang at the controls, on April 16, 1972. The first song heard in stereo was "We Can Be Together (Unedited Version)" by Jefferson Airplane from their Volunteers album. In 1973, the station began broadcasting 24 hours a day.

Carrier AM broadcasts were continued by WDBS, a training station for budding WPGU on air personalities. When cable came to Champaign–Urbana, the company agreed to broadcast WDBS on FM 101 for dorm radios that had a special cable hookup. FM cablecasts began on October 8, 1982, and continued until 1992.

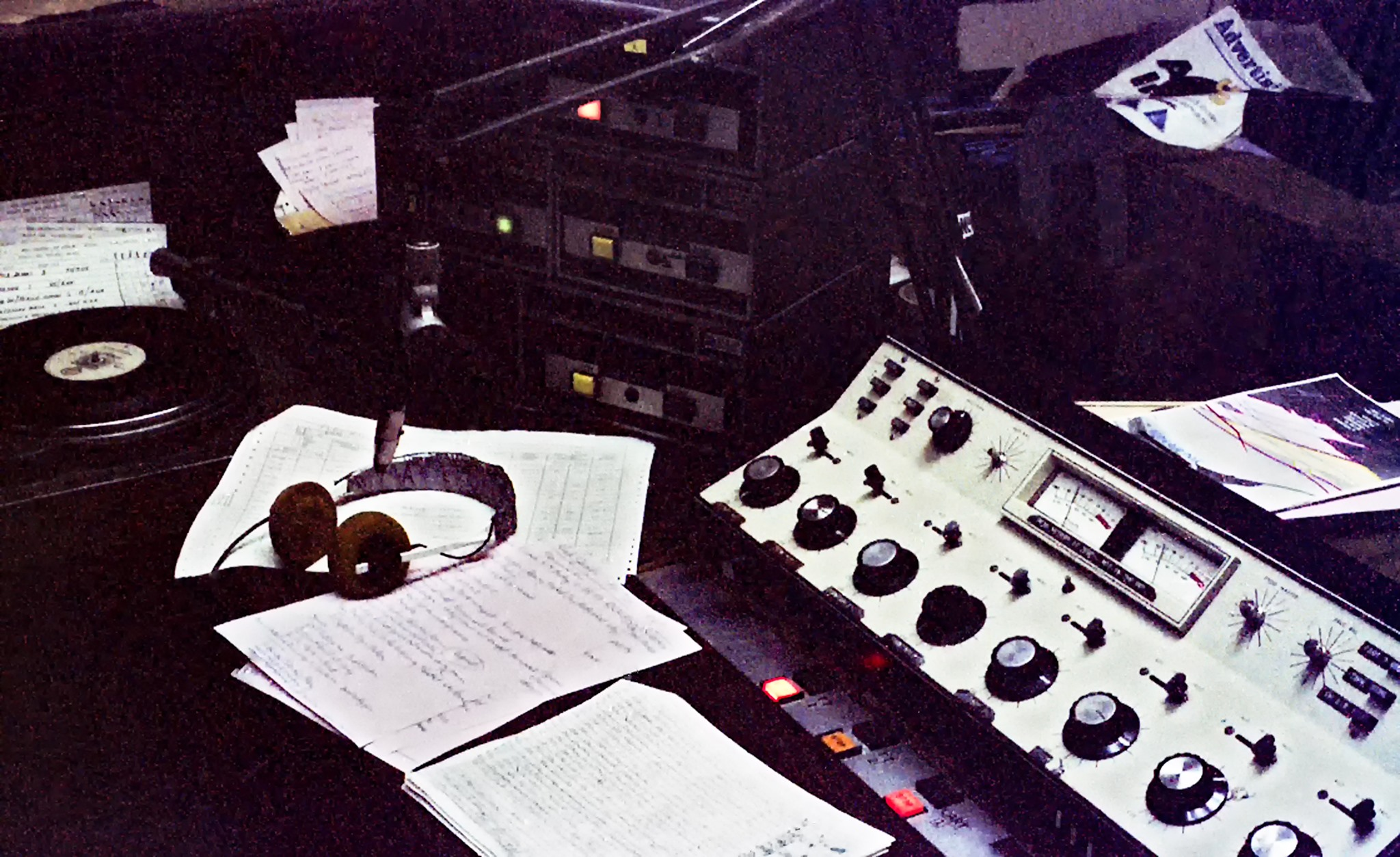
WDBS DJ Console, Weston Hall (1982)

=== Shows and Slogans ===
WPGU has had many slogans through the years. It was "Full Service Radio" in the early 1960s, "Progressive Rock" and "The Sound of the Seventies" in the 1970s, "Rockin' for you!", "Champaign-Urbana's home of Rock 'N' Roll!", and "The Rock of the '80's" in the 1980s. The on-air personalities prided themselves in playing progressive rock, often left to their own devices to play anything from heavy metal to punk rock in the same day.

WPGU was once known, during the heyday of the alternative/grunge music genre in the 1990s, as "Champaign-Urbana's Modern Rock, 107.1, The Planet". It has since reverted to simply "WPGU". It has had various yearly slogans including: "Whether You Insist on the Twist or Strings are Your Things, WPGU for You" (1963), "The Radio Station" (1974), "No Pinhead Radio" (1988), "Twenty Five Years and Still Rockin" (1992), "Either You're Rock or You're Pop!" (1993), "No Rules Radio" (2004), "The Only Alternative"(2002), "Your True Alternative" (2007), and "Champaign's Alternative" (2011).

=== Expansion to the web ===
In late 2007, WPGU joined with weekly entertainment magazine, the buzz, to create the217.com, a fusion of local and national music and entertainment news targeted at the Champaign-Urbana area. Both entities' websites were merged into one larger site containing articles, a searchable index containing every artist WPGU plays, a local events calendar, and a business directory.

In 2011, WPGU split with the217.com and moved its online presence to WPGU.com, where DJ blogs, music news, podcasts, and other content is available. WPGU's hourly playlists are archived and available in real time, and the radio station is also streamed live online.

== Alumni ==
- Tom Merritt - TV and podcast personality, working at CNET, TechTV, and TWiT.tv.
- Charlie Meyerson — radio, newspaper and internet reporter in Chicago.
- Sean Evans (interviewer) — Youtuber, Hot Ones host.

1960s:

- Roger Ebert
- Lane Venardos CBS News Executive Producer Evening News, Special Events
- Jim Hattendorf ABC Chicago & Los Angeles News Executive
- Arnold Klinsky General Manager, WHEC Buffalo NY
- Ken Keller, News Director Quad Cities IL & Professor Southern Illinois University
- Rick Sallinger, Peabody Award Winning Reporter Denver, CNN London, NBC5 Chicago
- Joe Paszczyk, NBC5 Chicago

1970s:

- Bob Epstein, NBC Executive Producer Nightly News, Special Events
- Mitch Locin, Chicago Tribune
- Danice Kern, Executive NBC5 & CBS2 Chicago

1980s: Dave Stern, Minutia Men Podcast, Eckhartz Press

== See also ==
- Campus radio
- List of college radio stations in the United States
