= Illini Media =

Student media company in Illinois, US

Illini Media Company
- Status: Active
- Predecessor: Illini Publishing Company
- Founded: 1911
- Country of origin: United States
- Headquarters location: University YMCA; 1001 S. Wright St. Champaign, Illinois
- Distribution: Nationwide
- Publication types: Books, newspapers, and magazines
- Imprints: Daily Illini; Buzz; Illio; Technograph; WPGU
- Official website: illinimedia.org

The Illini Media Company is a nonprofit, student media company based in Champaign, Illinois. The company owns several student-run media outlets associated with the University of Illinois Urbana-Champaign: the general newspaper, the Daily Illini; the entertainment paper, Buzz Magazine; the engineering quarterly, Technograph; the U of I yearbook, the Illio; and the commercial radio station, WPGU.

The Illini Publishing Company was chartered by the State of Illinois in 1911. In 1984, it became the Illini Media Company. The company helps students prepare for and careers in print media and broadcasting and to inform and entertain the University of Illinois community. Revenues exceed $2.5 million.

In 2012, the Illini Media sought support to keep its business running. Prominent alumni, such as film critic Roger Ebert, urged alumni to donate to the corporation. Additionally, a referendum passed to allow a fee on student's tuition to go towards the company.

== Location ==
The Illini Media Company is housed at what was previously the Illini Media Building, located at 512 East Green Street in Champaign. Illini Media has since sold the building and moved all of its units to the third floor.

== Media ==
=== Daily Illini ===
The Daily Illini (commonly known as the DI) is a student-run newspaper that has been published for the community of the University of Illinois Urbana-Champaign since 1871. Weekday circulation during fall and spring semesters is 20,000; copies are distributed free at more than 200 locations throughout Champaign-Urbana.

Although the Daily Illini claims to be "The independent student newspaper...since 1871," questions about the independence of Illini Media arose after the student fee was imposed – it is estimated that revenue from mandatory student fees accounts for "10-12% of Illini Media's annual budget."

=== WPGU 107.1 ===
WPGU 107.1 is a fully commercial student-run radio station located at the University of Illinois Urbana-Champaign. It is operational 24-7, broadcasting alternative music and other programming throughout Champaign-Urbana and surrounding communities.

=== Buzz Magazine ===
Buzz is a weekly entertainment magazine published every Friday by the Illini Media Company. The magazine was previously included as a weekly insert in The Daily Illini, but is now considered a stand-alone publication. Buzz is the only alt-weekly print publication in Champaign-Urbana. Covering film, television, music and theatre reviews, and local events, Buzz contains feature stories on the local entertainment scene.

=== Illio ===
Cover of the 1916 edition of Illio

Illio is the official yearbook of the University of Illinois Urbana-Champaign. Since 1894, Illio has been documenting and preserving the campus through yearbooks. Today's yearbook has many different sections, including Groups & Greeks, Campus Life, Senior Pictures, and more.

=== Technograph Magazine ===
Technograph is an engineering quarterly at the University of Illinois. It began in 1855 as the Selected Papers of the Civil Engineers' Club of the University of Illinois. The magazine covers engineering and new technology and features profiles of leaders in the field. Technograph is available as a quarterly insert in the Daily Illini. Additionally, more than 1,000 copies are sent to high school libraries across the state of Illinois.

== Famous alumni ==
- Iris Chang, author of the international best-seller, The Rape of Nanking, was a features writer for the Daily Illini from 1987-89.
- Roger Ebert, film critic, was editor-in-chief of the Daily Illini in 1963–64, when he attended the University of Illinois Urbana-Champaign. He also worked for Illini Media's terrestrial radio station WPGU.
- Hugh Hefner, editor in chief and chief creative officer of Playboy Enterprises, worked as a cartoonist for the Daily Illini from 1946 to 1949.
- Will Leitch, editor of the online magazine Deadspin and author of God Save The Fan, was the managing editor of the Daily Illini in 1996.

== Competition ==
The Hub, published between April 2004 and October 2006, was the last of a series of non-university affiliated alternative weeklies that competed with Illini Media. Previous alternative weeklies include The Paper, closed in 2004; The Octopus (under Yesse! Communications and then under the Saga Communications radio conglomerate), published from 1995–2002; C-U Cityview, 2002–2003; and The Optimist, 1994–1995.
