= The Daily Illini =

Student newspaper in Illinois

Daily Illini
- "The independent student newspaper at the University of Illinois"
- Type: Student newspaper
- Format: News magazine
- Owner: Illini Media Company
- Founded: 1871
- Language: English
- Headquarters: University YMCA; 1001 S. Wright St, Champaign, Illinois 61820
- Country: United States
- Circulation: 9,000 (when classes are in session)
- ISSN: 8750-6769
- Website: dailyillini.com
- Free online archives: library.illinois.edu

The Daily Illini, commonly known as The DI, is a student-run newspaper that has been published for the community of the University of Illinois Urbana-Champaign since 1871. It is distributed monthly for free at more than 150 locations across Champaign-Urbana. In May 2018, Illini Media moved from its Green Street location to the University YMCA.

Print editions dating back to 2012 are available on Issuu.

The paper is published by Illini Media Company (IMC), a not-for-profit corporation which owns several other student-run media outlets, and also operates WPGU 107.1 FM, a student-run commercial radio station. While the paper claims to be operationally fully independent from the university, it has faculty on its Board of Directors. This in addition to its funding by mandatory, non-refundable student fees have led to questions about its editorial independence.

== History ==
=== The Student ===
The Daily Illini was preceded by The Student, published as a monthly, beginning with its first issue in November 1871 and concluding with its last issue in December 1873. The first issue of The Student from November 1871 states that the publication was edited by members of the senior class of the Illinois Industrial University, as the University of Illinois was called at the time. In the Salutatory of the first issue, the editors plead with readers to read with a “charitable eye” in regard to any shortcomings of their early issues, such as “inaccuracy” and “dullness”, as well as its visual appearance on account of their inexperience and the desire to improve future issues. Topics covered in the first issue of The Student include Edgar Allan Poe, the study of language, a specific type of caterpillar, color blindness, the training of animals for exhibition purposes, American politics and architecture, as well as other topics in science. Also published in the first issue, an Illinois Central Railroad time table, well wishes for a newly married couple, a plea to readers to financially support the paper, its advertising rates, with one column costing $40 for one year, a list of departments of study at the university, including Mining Engineering, requirements for admission, stating that students must be at least 15 years of age, and various advertisements, including one for a “Manufacturer of Saddles and Harness” in Champaign.

The final issue of The Student was published in December 1873 and was the twenty-third issue of the paper, with more stylization and formatting than its first issue. Topics covered in the final issue of The Student include war and a summary of a university board meeting. The final issue of The Student also mentions uncertainty of the future of the newspaper, citing the potential for it to be run by representatives of the entirety of the student body of the Illinois Industrial University, also referencing a meeting of the General Assembly of Students at which a resolution was passed for The Senate to take over “management and publication of The Student”. A committee was subsequently established to handle the paper and its transition.

=== The Illini ===
In January 1874, the month immediately following the final issue of The Student, the first issue of The Illini was published. In its prospectus, the first issue of The Illini references The Student and a desire to uphold its “former interest as a lively, cheerful, home journal”. The prospectus also states the goal of The Illini as being to “fairly represent the University” as well as “the state and progress of literature, science and human industry elsewhere”. In contrast to The Student, The Illini was to be led by a university faculty committee and students originating from different departments within the university. In an editorial in the same first issue of The Illini, “wishing to make it more worthy the institution which fosters it, we transfer it to the student's Senate of the University, believing that the Faculty and students from being more intimately connected with it, will labor more earnestly for its success”. Topics covered in the first issue of The Illini include The Bau-Akademie, an architecture school in Berlin, Germany, the classification of animals in terms of the work of the late Professor Louis Agassiz, statements made at a dedication ceremony for the campuses Adelphic Society, an account of a writer’s dream in which they wished for Ancient History exam answers instead of studying, Natural History, the time the university ran on, and a campus forest tree plantation handled by the Department of Horticulture.

=== The Daily Illini ===
The last issue titled The Illini was published In June 1907 and was at this point published daily, except for on Mondays. The following issue, published in September 1907, resuming after publication ended for the summer, was the first to be titled The Daily Illini, without mention of the change in either the June 1907 issue or September 1907 issue. Despite the title change coming in September 1907, The Illini had begun daily publication five years prior, in September 1902. By 1975, The Daily Illini was published daily, except Sunday and Monday during the academic year and daily except Sunday, Monday, and Saturday during the summer.

== Staff ==
The editorial, business and production departments are staffed by students who are enrolled in a wide variety of degree programs, not just journalism. The company's limited full-time professionals, including the newspaper’s publisher and business directors, are employees of IMC. Some students are paid for their jobs in reporting, editing, production and advertising, but some of the students work for free.

The Daily Illini staff completely changes once per year, known as "turnover" in the DI offices. "Turnover" means the current group of editors (editor-in-chief, news editors, sports editors, opinions editors and features editors, among others) finish their tenure at the DI in their current editing position, and a new group of editors fills these positions. The new editor-in-chief is chosen by some members of the IMC, and then the editor-in-chief chooses all of the other editors that will work under him/her.

At the beginning of each fall and spring semester, the DI hires new reporters and staff members. All University of Illinois students, regardless of major, are encouraged to apply.

== Prominent staff emeriti ==
Notable alumni of the newspaper include author and famed New Yorker editor William Maxwell, novelist Nelson Algren, ABC News political director Hal Bruno, Rape of Nanking author Iris Chang, Simpsons producer/writer Larry Doyle, film critic Roger Ebert, novelist Dave Eggers, folk singer Dan Fogelberg, High Times editor Steven Hager, Playboy founder/CEO Hugh Hefner, attorney Albert E. Jenner Jr., columnist Robert Novak, Coast to Coast Live radio host Ian Punnett, advice columnist Dan Savage, film critic Gene Shalit, author Dave Cullen, author and international correspondent Ted Kemp, and several Pulitzer Prize winners.

== Controversies ==
=== Antisemitism ===
In January 2003, The Daily Illini printed a letter in its opinion section titled "Jews Manipulate America." A large amount of criticism followed soon after, calling into question the paper's editorial policy. The editors responded by defending their right to publish it. Critics stated that the publishing of this letter was not surprising to them after The Daily Illini's history of publishing other articles that they held to be anti-Semitic. Previous letters published in The Daily Illini had accused Israel of being guilty of genocide, and another compared the Jews to Nazis. Moreover, while The Daily Illini apologized when it published a photo thought to be demeaning to black students, it refused to apologize for publishing a letter claiming that Jews manipulate America.

In December 2003, the paper published an article by Miriam Sobh called "Stop Turning a Blind Eye" that contained a quote attributed to Ariel Sharon that was fabricated. (See Alleged Ouze Merham interview of Ariel Sharon.) The author later gave a full apology for using the fabricated quote. Despite the controversy that occurred from printing the falsely attributed quote the first time, The Daily Illini printed it a second time on November 19, 2004, in another article.

The DI also published an antisemitic comic strip on November 5, 2004, strip of I Hate Pam. The paper acknowledged in a later editorial that the strip mocked Jews. The comic was suspended for approximately four weeks.

=== Jyllands-Posten participation ===
The newspaper's former editor-in-chief Acton Gorton and opinions editor Chuck Prochaska made a controversial decision in February 2006 to print the cartoons from the Jyllands-Posten Muhammad cartoons controversy that had previously been printed in Europe and had led to protests around the world and a few instances of violent rioting by offended Muslims. Gorton's column that accompanied the cartoons was cited to support the first view. Prochaska and Gorton were also criticized by fellow editors in a later editorial for not following protocol in previously discussing their printing, though it was revealed later that some of the staff did know about it in the hours prior to printing. A firestorm of letters and calls from all over the country and the world came into the Daily Illini expressing both support and outrage. Gorton and Prochaska were suspended with pay for two weeks to investigate whether proper procedures were followed. As of March 14, 2006, Gorton was terminated from the Daily Illini. Prochaska was offered the opportunity to return to his position but refused.

=== Editorial accuracy ===
The Daily Illini editorials were halted on September 22, 2006, after the September 20, 2006 editorial on the Midnight Madness basketball event was found to contain misinformation and misinterpretation. The paper resumed publishing editorials on October 9, 2006 with an editorial explaining the changes to the way editorials will be researched and published. However, even with the new guidelines, on November 29, 2006, the newspaper printed an editorial calling Representative Charles B. Rangel a Republican when describing his draft bill. Rangel is a Democrat.

== 2012 financial crisis ==
In February 2012, The Daily Illini enlisted the help of University of Illinois alumnus and film critic Roger Ebert to raise funds for the newspaper. The Daily Illini owed nearly $250,000 loan on their building. The twelve-page broadsheet, which is very costly, played a part in the struggling company. As the paper is funded and published by the Illini Media Company, it receives money from the University of Illinois Urbana-Champaign via mandatory student fees. These fees were approved by the University Board of Trustees.
