= Marie Rivière =

French actress and filmmaker (born 1956)

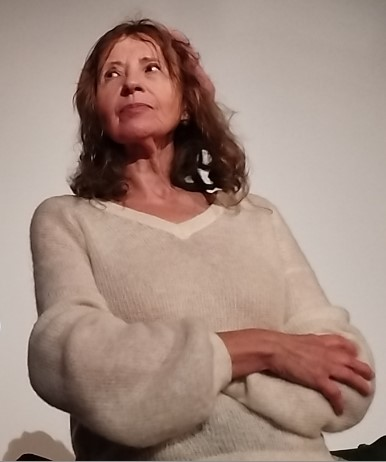
- Rivière in 2024
- Born: 22 December 1956 (age 69); Montreuil, Seine-Saint-Denis, France
- Occupations: Actress, director, screenwriter, cinematographer, editor, producer
- Years active: 1978–present

Marie Rivière (French pronunciation: [maʁi ʁivjɛʁ]; born 22 December 1956) is a French actress and filmmaker. She is known for her collaborations with director Éric Rohmer.

From a working-class background, Marie Rivière grew up on a housing estate/project in Montreuil before working as a schoolteacher, then as a shop assistant. At 21, having seen L'Amour l'après-midi, she sent a letter and photo to Éric Rohmer. He saw her in his office at Les Films du Losange, in the presence of Arielle Dombasle and Thierry Lhermitte, and offered her a small role in Perceval le Gallois. Two years later she appeared in Rohmer's The Aviator's Wife, the first in the Comédies et Proverbes series. The Green Ray, in which she played the fragile dreamer Delphine, was a critical and popular success, and won the Golden Lion at Venice. In 1998 she appeared again for Rohmer in Conte d'automne (Autumn Tale), alongside another Rohmer muse, Béatrice Romand.

She co-directed her first film in 1993, with Marc Rivière, La règle du silence.

== Filmography ==
Year	Title	Role	Director	Notes
1978	Perceval le Gallois	Garin's daughter	Éric Rohmer	
1978	La vie comme ça	Florence	Jean-Claude Brisseau	TV movie
1979	Confidences pour confidences	A student	Pascal Thomas	
1980	Catherine de Heilbronn	Brigitte	Éric Rohmer (2)	TV movie
1981	The Aviator's Wife	Anne	Éric Rohmer (3)	
1981	La vie des autres	Catherine Sarrazin	Jean-Pierre Prévost	TV series (1 episode)
1982	Chassé-croisé		Arielle Dombasle	
1983	Life Is a Bed of Roses		Alain Resnais	
1983	Rosette sort le soir	Marie	Rosette	Short
1984	Raison perdue	Paula	Michel Favart	TV movie
1985	Folie suisse	Anna Daubigny	Christine Lipinska	
1985	Rosette vend des roses	Rosette's friend	Rosette (2)	Short
1986	The Green Ray	Delphine	Éric Rohmer (4)	Also writer Venice Film Festival - Pasinetti Award for Best Actress
1986	La Barbe-bleue	The dead	Alain Ferrari	TV movie
1986	Le rire de Caïn		Marcel Moussy	TV mini-series
1987	Four Adventures of Reinette and Mirabelle	Swindler	Éric Rohmer (5)	
1987	Rosette cherche une chambre	Florence	Rosette (3)	Short
1987	Côté nuit		Jean-Baptiste Huber	Short
1987	La nuit du coucou	Françoise	Michel Favart (2)	TV movie
1988	Le bonheur se porte large	Isabelle	Alex Métayer	
1988	Rosette vole les voleurs	Rosette's friend	Rosette (4)	Short
1988	Les lutteurs immobiles	Judith	André Farwagi	TV movie
1989	Papa est parti, maman aussi	The mother	Christine Lipinska (2)	
1990	Les bottes de sept lieues		Hervé Baslé	TV movie
1991	Le sommeil d'Adrien		Caroline Champetier	Short
1991	Paparoff		Didier Albert	TV series (1 episode)
1992	A Tale of Winter	Dora	Éric Rohmer (6)	
1992	Le cahier volé	Lucie	Christine Lipinska (3)	
1993	Couples et amants	Juliette	John Lvoff	
1995	Muriel fait le désespoir de ses parents	Muriel's Mum	Philippe Faucon	
1995	Sept en attente		Françoise Etchegaray	
1995	La règle du silence	Co-director	Marie & Marc Rivière	TV movie
1996	Les jumeaux	Mother	Catherine Klein	Short
1998	Autumn Tale	Isabelle	Éric Rohmer (7)	
1999	Venus Beauty Institute	The client with boots	Tonie Marshall	
2000	Girls Can't Swim	Anne-Marie	Anne-Sophie Birot	
2000	Marie-Line	Louise	Mehdi Charef	
2000	Samia	The counselor	Philippe Faucon (2)	
2001	The Lady and the Duke	Madame Laurent	Éric Rohmer (8)	
2001	Le temps qu'il fait		Nicolas Leclère	Short
2001	L'interpellation	Hélène Brunel	Marco Pauly	TV movie
2003	Zéro défaut	Simone	Pierre Schoeller	
2003	Clandestino	The driver	Paule Muxel	
2003	Anna, 3 kilos 2		Laurette Polmanss	Short
2003	Un autre homme		Catherine Klein (2)	Short
2005	Time to Leave	The mother	François Ozon	
2005	Love Is in the Air	Charlotte's mother	Rémi Bezançon	
2005	Le canapé rouge	The woman	Éric Rohmer (9)	Short
2007	Actrices	The costume designer	Valeria Bruni Tedeschi	
2007	Romance of Astree and Celadon	Céladon's mother	Éric Rohmer (10)	
2007	Femme femme	Annie	Marina Deak	Short
2009	The Refuge	The woman on the beach	François Ozon (2)	
2009	Adresse inconnue	Adèle Fontaine	Alain Wermus	TV series (1 episode)
2010	Memory Lane	Aude	Mikhaël Hers	
2011	La noyée	Elise	Mathieu Hippeau	Short
2012	El Turrrf	Suzanne	Louis-Ronan Choisy	Short
2012	Sous la neige	Mother	Aurélien Héraud	Short
2012	Lupa		Clémentine Poidatz	Short
2013	Bright Days Ahead	Jocelyne	Marion Vernoux	
2013	A Castle in Italy	Nathan's mother	Valeria Bruni Tedeschi (2)	
2013	Où je mets ma pudeur	The teacher	Sébastien Bailly	Short
2013	La peur	The teacher	Grégoire Pontécaille	Short
2014	The Missionaries	Martine	Tonie Marshall (2)	
2014	Madeleine et les deux Apaches	Madeleine	Christelle Lheureux	Short
2014	Petit lapin	Eva's mother	Hubert Viel	Short
2015	Courted	Marie-Laure Racine	Christian Vincent	
2015	This Summer Feeling	Adélaïde	Mikhaël Hers (2)	
2015	Deux femmes au cinéma		Mathieu Hippeau (2)	Short
2016	Down by Love	Anna's mother	Pierre Godeau	

== Theater ==
Year	Title	Author	Director
1979	Das Käthchen von Heilbronn	Heinrich von Kleist	Éric Rohmer
2004	La Cour	Monique Jouvancy	Bruno Boussagol
2009	Elisa's Skin	Carole Fréchette	Carole Anderson
2014	Balakat	Delphine Hecquet	Delphine Hecquet

== Author ==
Year	Book	Publishing	Notes
1988	Un amour aux assises	Bernard Barrault	Novel
