= The Aviator's Wife =

1981 film by Éric Rohmer

- Theatrical release poster
- French: La Femme de l'aviateur
- Directed by: Éric Rohmer
- Written by: Éric Rohmer
- Produced by: Margaret Ménégoz
- Starring: Philippe Marlaud; Marie Rivière; Anne-Laure Meury; Mathieu Carrière; Philippe Caroit; Haydée Caillot; Mary Stephen; Rosette; Fabrice Luchini
- Cinematography: Bernard Lutic
- Edited by: Cécile Decugis
- Music by: Georges Prat
- Production company: Les Films du Losange
- Distributed by: Gaumont Distribution
- Release date: 4 March 1981 (France)
- Running time: 104 minutes
- Country: France
- Language: French
- Box office: $835,000

The Aviator's Wife (French: La Femme de l'aviateur) is a 1981 French romantic comedy-drama film written and directed by Éric Rohmer. The film stars Philippe Marlaud, Marie Rivière and Anne-Laure Meury. Like many of Rohmer's films, it deals with the ever-evolving love lives of a group of young Parisians.

The film is the first instalment in Rohmer's "Comedies & Proverbs" series—a collection of six films the director made during the 1980s. Each of these films begins with a proverb, in the case of The Aviator's Wife this is: "On ne saurait penser à rien" or "It is impossible to think about nothing".

== Plot ==
Twenty-year-old François is in love with the fiercely independent 25-year-old Anne. One morning, Anne's airline-pilot ex, Christian, visits her to tell her that it is over between them and that he will return to his wife. François just happens to see the two leave Anne's building together and becomes obsessed with the idea that she is cheating on him.

As he strolls aimlessly through the streets of Paris, he catches sight of Christian in a café with another woman. As they leave and jump on a bus, François decides to follow them. A 15-year-old girl from the same bus, Lucie, is interested in François and playfully joins in with his amateur espionage.

Throughout the day, their stories and explanations for Christian's action become increasingly complex and outlandish. Later, Lucie leaves François at a cafe giving him her address but not phone number ("mother would object") - Lucie wants François to write to her if or when he finds out what Christian and the woman were up to. Alone, François sees the pair get in a taxi. François returns to Anne where he learns that all was not as it seemed between Christian and the blonde woman (it is revealed to be his sister). The two mend their relationship, though Anne appears hurt after François begrudgingly tells her about the afternoon he spent with Lucie.

Later that night, François goes to Lucie's place to place a postcard in her mailbox. He spots Lucie embracing a young man (who is coincidentally a co-worker of François'), obviously after a date. He leaves, considers tossing the postcard, but stops on the way home to buy a stamp and posts it to her.

== Cast ==
- Philippe Marlaud as François
- Marie Rivière as Anne
- Anne-Laure Meury as Lucie
- Mathieu Carrière as Christian
- Philippe Caroit as François' friend
- Coralie Clément as Anne's colleague
- Lisa Hérédia as Anne's friend
- Haydée Caillot as blonde woman
- Mary Stephen as tourist in Parc des Buttes Chaumont
- Neil Chan as tourist in Parc des Buttes Chaumont
- Rosette as concierge
- Fabrice Luchini as Mercillat

== Background ==
After completing his "Six Moral Tales" series in 1972 with Love in the Afternoon, Rohmer spent the remainder of the decade filming historical literary adaptations, such as The Marquise of O (1976) and Perceval le Gallois (1978). At the beginning of the next decade, the director returned to writing his own material and The Aviator's Wife is the first of the "Comedies & Proverbs" series.

== Reception ==
On Rotten Tomatoes the film has an approval rating of 90% based on reviews from 10 critics.

Roger Ebert praised the film, particularly the acting, giving it 3.5 out of 4. Dave Kehr of the Chicago Reader called it "A perfect film." Janet Maslin of The New York Times gave the film a positive review, but notes that there is a lot of talk, and that characters "express their fears and wishes in a relatively simple fashion" and that this "makes the material seem thin."
