= François-Marie Banier =

French novelist (born 1947)

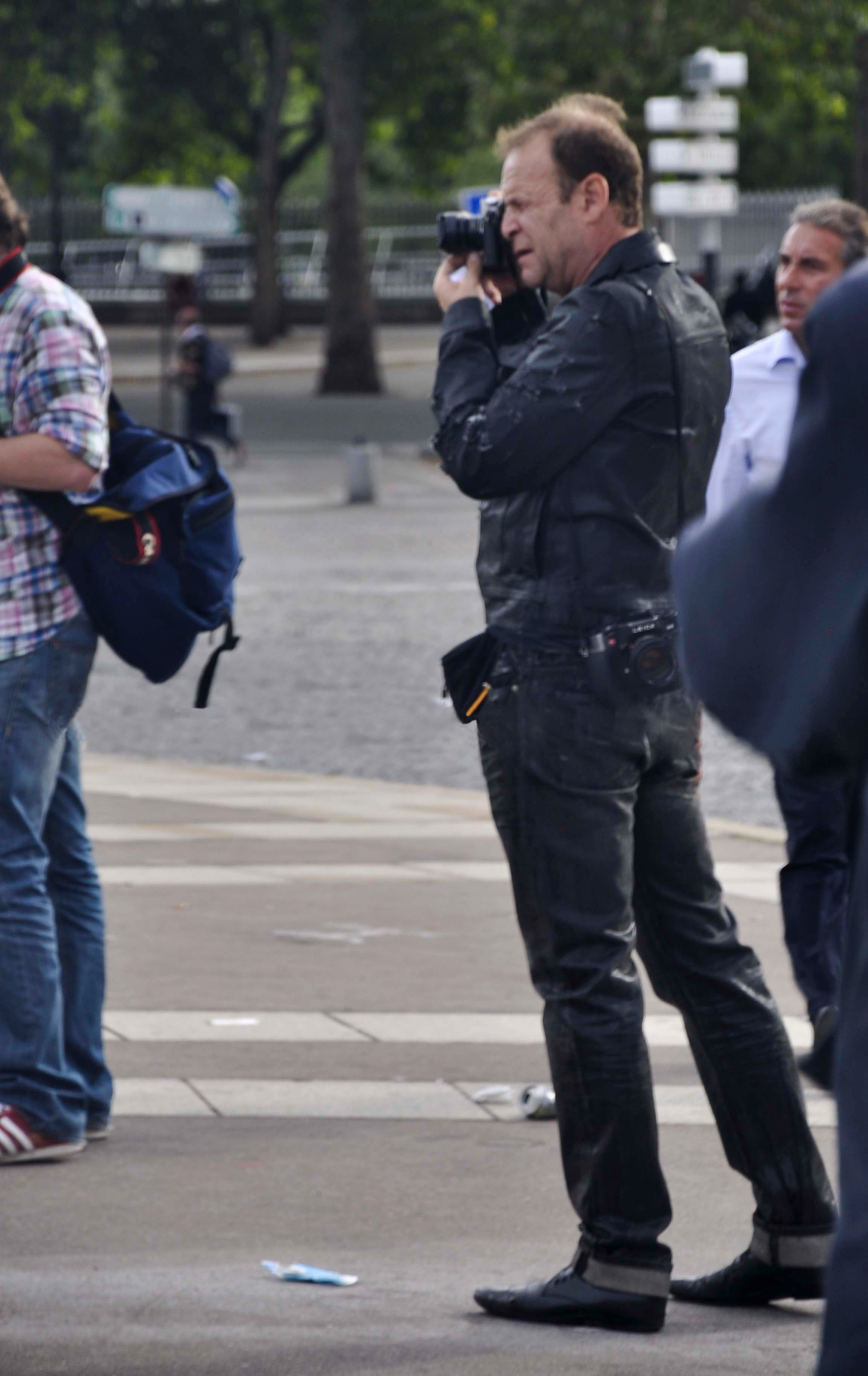
- Banier in 2010
- Born: 27 June 1947 (age 79); Paris, France
- Occupations: Novelist, playwright, artist, actor and photographer

François-Marie Banier (French pronunciation: [fʁɑ̃swa maʁi banje]) (born 27 June 1947) is a French novelist, playwright, artist, actor and photographer. His published works include Le Passé Composé (1971) and Balthazar, Fils de Famille (1985).

Banier is particularly known for his photographs of celebrities and other public figures and for his friendships with members of high society. In a prominent legal case, in 2016, he was convicted of 'abuse of weakness' of the elderly billionaire Liliane Bettencourt.

== Early life ==
Banier was born on June 27, 1947, in Paris, France. A second son, he grew up in a middle-class family in the 16th arrondissement of Paris. He has claimed he had been "completely incomprehensible to [his] parents". Although Banier was brought up as a Catholic, his Hungarian-born father (actual name: Banyaï) concealed the fact that he had converted from Judaism under the Nazi regime. His father was an advertising executive, who beat him for disobeying “idiotic rules” and this led him to attempt suicide at the age of 15.

Despite his modest background, from an early age he was a precocious and hyperactive talent, who was able to develop friendships with some of Paris' wealthiest arts patrons and artists. At the age of 16, he met Salvador Dalí, who would send his car to bring Banier to his suite at the Hotel Meurice to discuss art. At the age of 19, he befriended the wealthy heiress and patron of the arts Marie-Laure de Noailles who was then 64.

== Career ==
At the age of 19, Banier was given the responsibility of managing press relations for fashion designer Pierre Cardin's two boutiques on the Left Bank of Paris. While working for Cardin, he began taking photographs, and among his earliest subjects was novelist Truman Capote.

In 1969, Banier published his first novel, Les Résidences secondaires ou la Vie distraite (Second Homes or Distracted Life), at the age of 22. Around the same time, a well-known Parisian designer and antique dealer Madeleine Castaing collected some of his photographs.

In 1971, Banier published his second novel, Le Passé Composé.

In August 1972, The Sunday Times Magazine ran a cover story by James Fox titled "François-Marie Banier—Golden Boy of Paris," accompanied by photos of Banier around Paris by Eve Arnold. "When James's story came out I received thousands of letters from English boys. Girls sent me pictures of themselves in the nude. I received money in the mail … James's article was cretinous. It did me a disservice by missing the anxiety of my youth, the difficulty I was experiencing as a young boy alone, in front of life without family," Banier said.

His third novel, La Tête la Première (Head First), was published in 1972.

In 1975, he wrote his first play, Hôtel du Lac. It was produced by Sao Schlumberger and opened at the Theatre Moderne in Paris to great acclaim. She then offered to financially support him, but he declined. "São was so generous," he later recalled. "One day she said, 'François-Marie, the purpose of your life is to write. But you have no money. So Pierre and I decided we are going to buy you a flat and give you an income every month. You can turn out to be Proust or nobody. But for us you are a treasure.' And I said to her, 'São, I am sorry, but I am paying for the lunch today. And never talk to me again like that!' When I think of what a cretin I was! She said, 'You won’t be dependent on us. We have a fortune. We want to do this.'"

Banier's photographs were first exhibited at the Centre Pompidou in Paris in 1991. He has since exhibited his work internationally including at the Metropolitan Museum of Photography in Tokyo, Museum Haus Lange in Krefeld, and Villa Medici in Rome.

== Personal life ==
Banier was romantically linked to interior designer Jacques Grange. In 1972, fashion designer Yves Saint Laurent invited them to Marrakech for Easter where they met artist Andy Warhol. He dated actor Pascal Greggory, and they lived together for seven years. Banier lives with his partner, Greggory's nephew, Martin d’Orgeval, in Paris.

Over the years, Banier befriended many well-known public figures and celebrities, including Salvador Dalí, Yves Saint Laurent, Françoise Sagan, Samuel Beckett, Vladimir Horowitz, Louis Aragon, François Mitterrand, Kate Moss, Mick Jagger, and Princess Caroline of Monaco.

Banier is a friend of Johnny Depp and his former partner Vanessa Paradis, whom he met at his home in the south of France. Banier is godfather to their daughter, Lily-Rose Depp.

Banier is also a close friend of Lord Cholmondeley and is the godfather of his twins, Alexander Hugh George and Oliver Timothy George.

=== Relationship with Liliane Bettencourt ===
In 1987, Banier was commissioned to photograph Liliane Bettencourt and Federico Fellini for the French magazine Egoiste. Bettencourt was one of the principal shareholders of L'Oréal and one of the wealthiest people in the world with an estimated fortune of US$40.1 billion. Over the ensuing years, Banier and Bettencourt became friends and she became his chief benefactor, bestowing gifts upon him estimated to be worth as much as €1.3 billion. These gifts included a life insurance policy worth €253 million in 2003, another life insurance policy worth €262 million in 2006, 11 works of art in 2001 valued at €20 million, including paintings by Picasso, Matisse, Mondrian, Delaunay and Léger and a photograph by surrealist Man Ray and cash. The life insurance policies were allegedly signed over to Banier after Bettencourt was recovering from two hospital stays in 2003 and 2006.

In December 2007, Françoise Bettencourt Meyers, the daughter of Bettencourt, lodged a criminal complaint against Banier, accusing him of abus de faiblesse (or the exploitation of a physical or psychological weakness for personal gain) over Bettencourt. As a result of her complaint, the Brigade Financière, the financial investigative arm of the French national police, opened an investigation and, after interviewing members of Bettencourt's staff, determined to present the case to a court in Nanterre for trial in September 2009. In December 2009, the court delayed ruling on the case until April 2010 (later extended until July 2010) pending the results of a medical examination of Bettencourt's mental state. However, Bettencourt refused to submit to these examinations.

In July 2010, the trial was adjourned again until autumn 2010, at the earliest, after details of tape recordings made by Bettencourt's butler became public. The tapes allegedly reveal that Bettencourt had made Banier her "sole heir" (excluding the L'Oréal shares which made up the bulk of her estate and which had already been signed over to her daughter and two grandsons). Bettencourt later removed Banier from her will.

In 2015 Banier was convicted of 'abuse of weakness' of Liliane Bettencourt, prosecutor Gérard Aldigé stating he had "imposed his control over her like a spider spinning its web. And once he had her in his net, he never let her go. She became his thing. He dealt with her like a vampire." Banier was sentenced to two and a half years prison, and ordered to pay €158 million in damages to Liliane Bettencourt. Seven other defendants, including Liliane Bettencourt's financial advisor, lawyer, and notary, were also convicted and given lesser sentences.

Banier appealed. The second trial, which concluded in May 2016, upheld the conviction, but reduced his sentence to four years suspended and a €375,000 fine, cancelling the other damages.

== In popular culture ==
The 2025 movie The Richest Woman in the World, loosely based on Liliane Bettencourt, features a character based on Banier.

== Selected works ==
Novels

- Les Résidences Secondaires, Grasset, 1969
- Le Passé composé, Grasset, 1971
- La Tête la première, Grasset, 1972
- Balthazar, fils de famille, Gallimard, 1985, Grand prix des lectrices de Elle
- Sur un air de fête, Gallimard, 1990
- Les Femmes du métro Pompe, Gallimard, 2006
- Johnny Dasolo, Gallimard, 2008

Plays

- Hôtel du lac, Gallimard, 1975
- Nous ne connaissons pas la même personne, Grasset, 1978
- Je ne t'ai jamais aimé, Gallimard, 2000

Art books

- On N'est Jamais Tranquile, Steidl, 2010

Photography books

- Photographies, Gallimard/Denoël, 1991
- Past-Present, William Morrow, New York, 1996; Schirmer/Mosel, Munich 1997
- Vivre, São Paulo, Pinacoteca do Estado; Rio de Janeiro, Museum de Arte Moderna, 1999
- François-Marie Banier, Tokyo Metropolitan Museum of Photography, Asahi Schimbun, 2000
- Brésil, Gallimard, 2001
- François-Marie Banier, Miami Beach, Bass Museum of Art; Gallimard, 2003
- Le Chanteur muet des rues, en collaboration avec Erri de Luca, éd. Martin d'Orgeval, Gallimard, 2006
- Perdre la tête, Die schönsten deutschen Bücher (Prix du meilleur livre allemand, section photographie), 2006; Silver Crown Award, Moscou, 2007
- Vive la vie, with photographs of Natalia Vodianova. Steidl, Göttingen, Germany, 2008. ISBN 978-3-86521-821-6.
- Beckett, Steidl, 2009

== Exhibitions ==
- 1991 : Musée national d'Art moderne, Centre Georges-Pompidou, Paris
- 1994 : Bunkamera Gallery, Tokyo; galerie Beatrice Wassermann, Munich
- 1997 : Villa Farnèse, Rome
- 1998 : Private Heroes, Württembergischer Kunstverein, Stuttgart
- 2000 : Fotos y Pinturas, musée national des Beaux Arts d'Argentine, Buenos Aires
- 2001 : Täglich Neues, musée Ludwig; Coblence; Budapest
- 2003 : Maison européenne de la photographie, Paris
- 2003 : Transphotographiques, Lille, Crypte de la Cathédrale de la Treille
- 2005 : Perdre la tête, Académie de France à Rome, Villa Medici
- 2006 : True Stories, Istanbul Modern, Istanbul
- 2007 : Perdre la tête, Manège de Moscou
- 2007 : Galerie Gagosian, Los Angeles
- 2007 : Written Photos, Villa Oppenheim, Berlin
- 2007 : Transphotographiques, Lille, Eglise St Maurice
- 2009 : Beckett, Maison de la Photographie, Lille

== Filmography ==
- Chassé-croisé, film by Arielle Dombasle, 1982
- L'Argent, film by Robert Bresson, 1983
- La Nuit porte-jarretelles, film by Virginie Thévenet, 1985
- 4 aventures de Reinette et Mirabelle, film by Éric Rohmer, 1987
- L'Arbre, le maire et la médiathèque, film by Éric Rohmer, 1993
- L'Anglaise et le Duc, film by Éric Rohmer, 2001
- L'Heure d'été, film by Olivier Assayas, 2008
