= Alexia Portal =

French actress

Alexia Portal is a French actress best known for her role as Béatrice Romand's son's girlfriend in the 1998 film Autumn Tale.

== Filmography ==
- "Navarro"
  - Jour de colère (2006) TV Episode .... Sonya
  - Manipulation (2005) TV Episode .... Sophie
- Si j'étais elle (2004) (TV) .... Léa
- Tout pour l'oseille (2004) .... Marion
- "Cordier, juge et flic, Les"
  - Liens de sang (2004) TV Episode .... Sophie Lestrade
- Compagnon, Le (2003) (TV) .... Betty Tardieu
- "Avocats & associés"
  - Secrets de campagne (2003) TV Episode .... Clarisse
- Pont de l'aigle, Le (2002) (TV) .... Mathilde Coudert
- Monsieur Batignole (2002) .... Micheline Batignole
- Compagnon - choisir son père, Le (2002) (TV) .... Betty Tardieu
- Maigret et la croqueuse de diamants (2001) (TV) .... Gloria
- Un jeune Français (2000) (TV) .... Laure
- "Un homme en colère"
  - La peur de l'autre (2000) TV Episode .... Marine
- "Mai con i quadri" (1999) (mini) TV Series
- Temps d'un éclair, Le (1998) (TV) .... Jennifer
- Conte d'automne (1998) .... Rosine
  - a.k.a. Autumn Tale (USA)
- Bonnes vacances (1998) (TV) .... Justine
- Quand un ange passe (1998) (TV) .... Martine 68
- "Madame le proviseur"
  - a.k.a. Madame la proviseur (France: new title)
  - Bob et Samantha (1996) TV Episode .... Samantha
