= Four Adventures of Reinette and Mirabelle =

1987 film by Éric Rohmer

- Theatrical release poster
- French: Quatre aventures de Reinette et Mirabelle
- Directed by: Éric Rohmer
- Written by: Éric Rohmer
- Produced by: Margaret Ménégoz
- Starring: Joëlle Miquel; Jessica Forde; Philippe Laudenbach; Marie Rivière; Fabrice Luchini
- Cinematography: Sophie Maintigneux
- Edited by: María Luisa García
- Music by: Jean-Louis Valéro
- Production companies: Compagnie Éric Rohmer; Les Films du Losange
- Distributed by: Les Films du Losange
- Release date: 4 February 1987 (France)
- Running time: 99 minutes
- Country: France
- Language: French
- Box office: $575,000

Four Adventures of Reinette and Mirabelle (French: Quatre aventures de Reinette et Mirabelle) is a 1987 French comedy-drama film written and directed by Éric Rohmer, starring Joëlle Miquel, Jessica Forde, Philippe Laudenbach, Marie Rivière and Fabrice Luchini.

== Synopsis ==
The film consists of four episodes in the relationship of two young women: Reinette, a country girl, and Mirabelle, a Parisian. The first episode, "L'Heure bleue" ("The Blue Hour"), recounts their meeting, and Reinette's wish to share the blue hour, a moment of silence between the natural sounds of the night and the dawn. The second episode, "Le Garçon de café" ("The Waiter"), centers on a café and a difficult waiter. In the third, "Le Mendiant, la Kleptomane et l'Arnaqueuse" ("The Beggar, the Kleptomaniac and the Hustler"), the girls discuss their differing views on people at the margins of society: beggars, thieves and swindlers. In the fourth episode, "La Vente du tableau" ("Selling the Painting"), Reinette and Mirabelle succeed in selling one of Reinette's paintings to an art dealer, while Reinette pretends to be mute and Mirabelle, acting as if she does not know Reinette, does all the talking.

== Cast ==
- Joëlle Miquel as Reinette
- Jessica Forde as Mirabelle

"The Waiter"

- Philippe Laudenbach as the waiter
- François-Marie Banier as the first passer-by
- Jean-Claude Brisseau as the second passer-by

"The Beggar, the Kleptomaniac and the Hustler"

- Yasmine Haury as the kleptomaniac
- Gérard Courant as the male inspector
- Béatrice Romand as the female inspector
- Marie Rivière as the scammer
- David Rocksavage as the English tourist
- Jacques Auffray as the tapeur
- Haydée Caillot as the charitable woman

"Selling the Painting"

- Fabrice Luchini as the art dealer
- Marie Bouteloup and Françoise Valier as visitors in the gallery

== Reception ==
On review aggregator website Rotten Tomatoes, the film holds an approval rating of 100% based on 13 reviews, with an average rating of 8.5/10.
