= Virginie Thévenet =

French actress, director and screenwriter

- Born: 12 January 1957 (age 69); Paris, France
- Occupations: Film director, screenwriter, actress

Virginie Thévenet (born 12 January 1957, in Paris) is a French actress, director and screenwriter.

== Films with Virginie Thévenet as actress ==
- 1970 : Les Stances de Sophie, by Moshé Mizrahi
- 1972 : Faustine et le Bel Été
- 1972 : Les Zozos, by Pascal Thomas, Martine
- 1976 : Small Change, by François Truffaut
- 1976 : La Surprise du chef, by Pascal Thomas, Sabine
- 1977 : Une sale histoire, by Jean Eustache
- 1977 : La Nuit tous les chats sont gris , by Gérard Zingg, Jeannette
- 1978 : La Tortue sur le dos , by Luc Béraud, Nathalie
- 1981 : Quartet, by James Ivory, Mademoiselle Chardin
- 1981 : L'Année prochaine... si tout va bien , bye Jean-Loup Hubert, The girl who loves comics
- 1982 : Le Beau Mariage, by Éric Rohmer, La mariée
- 1983 : Debout les crabes, la mer monte !, by Jean-Jacques Grand-Jouan, Agnès
- 1984 : Il ne faut jurer de rien , by Christian Vincent (director) (short film)
- 1984 : Les Nuits de la pleine lune, by Éric Rohmer, Camille
- 1985 : Rosette vend des roses , by Rosette
- 1987 : Rosette cherche une chambre , by Rosette
- 1987 : Le Cri du hibou, by Claude Chabrol, Véronique
- 1988 : Ada dans la jungle, by Gérard Zingg

== Films directed by Virginie Thévenet ==
- La Nuit porte-jarretelles (1984)
- Jeux d'artifices (1986)
- Sam suffit (1992)
