= The Billionaire, the Butler and the Boyfriend =

- L'Affaire Bettencourt : Scandale chez la femme la plus riche du monde
- Directed by: Baptiste Etchegaray; Maxime Bonnet
- Country of origin: France
- Original language: French
- No. of seasons: 1
- No. of episodes: 3

Original release
- Release: 8 November 2023

The Billionaire, the Butler and the Boyfriend is a French docuseries which followed the life of L'Oreal heiress Lilianne Bettencourt and the scandals around her. It consists of 3 episodes, and was released on Netflix on 8 November 2023.

== Plot ==
The series follows the life of Lilianne Bettencourt and the people around her in the years leading up to her death. The major characters included her daughter, Françoise Bettencourt Meyers, photographer, Francois-Marie Banier and her butler, Pascal Bonnefoy.

== Episodes ==
No.	Title	Directed by	Written by	Original release date
1	"Because He Was Worth It"	Unknown	Unknown	8 November 2023
2	"A Tangled Web"	Unknown	Unknown	8 November 2023
3	"The Profiteers' Ball"	Unknown	Unknown	8 November 2023
