= Andy Gillet =

French fashion model and actor (born 1981)

- Born: 8 July 1981 (age 44); Saint-Denis, Réunion
- Occupation: Actor
- Years active: 2004–present

Andy Gillet (born 8 July 1981) is a French fashion model and actor primarily known for his work in European auteur cinema in such films as Éric Rohmer's Romance of Astree and Celadon (2007) and Andrzej Żuławski's Cosmos (2015). As a model, Gillet has represented numerous brands for their ad campaigns, including Hermès, Valentino, and Burberry, the last two shot by Mario Testino; he was also the face of the fragrance Kenzo Power by Kenzo Takada.

== Early life and education ==
Gillet grew up in Sallanches in Haute Savoie, the son of a policeman and a secretary, he has a younger brother. He completed his studies at Nancy Business School and moved to Paris.

== Career ==
Before he could manage to make a living from acting, Gillet was a theater usher but didn't have enough money to enroll in the 'Eva-Saint-Paul Drama School'. Due to his androgynous beauty, Gillet was then sent to Japan by an agency for four months to land modelling contracts but once in Tokyo, he found no work or relationship and felt lost in translation. From this failure, Gillet drew motivation declaring:

"This period of hardship I went through there forced me to reflect and made me mature. I returned to France with the 'niaque': no more dilemmas, I want to play. I changed my life."

He first appeared on stage in the title role of Caligula, in a celebrated staging by Charles Berling. He made his television debut in 2005, in the role of Hugh Despenser the Younger in the remake miniseries Les Rois maudits, based on the French novel series of the same name by Maurice Druon. He also appeared in series such as Éternelle and Un village français. His debut in cinema came in 2006, with Nouvelle chance by Anne Fontaine and L'homme de sa vie by Zabou Breitman. The following year, he appeared in acclaimed director Eric Rohmer's final film, Les Amours d'Astrée et de Céladon.

== Private life ==
Gillet has publicly shared on social media that his partner is musician, singer, and actor Brice Michelini, who appeared in Rebecca Zlotowski's Planétarium (2016). When Michelini was asked why he chose to write the song "Andy, I Love You" (French: "Andy, je t'aime") and have his boyfriend act in the music video, Michelini declared:

Because I love Andy. Andy, he's the man I love. This name came to me before I even made music. Andy is a muse: not just mine, a lot of people's muse. For me it was a waste to live with a muse and not do anything with it.

== Filmography ==
=== Film ===
Year	Title	Director	Role	Notes
2006	Oh La La!	Anne Fontaine	Raphaël	
2006	The Man of My Life	Zabou Breitman	Hugo	
2007	Romance of Astree and Celadon	Éric Rohmer	Céladon	
2008	Antique (서양골동양과자점 엔티크)	Min Kyu-dong	Jean-Baptiste Evan	
2009	La Dérive	Philippe Terrier-Hermann	Antonin	
2012	Mirror of Happiness	Sam Samore	Pierrot	
2014	Fort Buchanan (film)	Benjamin Crotty	Roger Sherwood	
2015	La Duchesse de Varsovie	Joseph Morder	Valentin	
2015	French Blood	Diastème	the second henchman	
2015	Cosmos	Andrzej Żuławski	Lucien	
2016	Chocolat	Roschdy Zem	the transvestite	
2016	The Misfortunes of François Jane	Patrick Pearse	Federick	
2016	Belle Dormant	Adolfo Arieta	King of Kentz	
2019	An Easy Girl	Rebecca Zlotowski	the diner guest	

=== Television ===
Year	Title	Director	Role	Notes
2006	Les Rois maudits (miniseries)	Josée Dayan	Hugh Despenser the Younger	
2009	Un village français	Philippe Triboit	Michel Bellini	Episode: Marchés noirs
2009	Éternelle	Didier Delaître	Thierry	Episodes: Plante disparue & Sang contaminé
2010	Gossip Girl	Mark Piznarski	Frenchman	Season 4, episode 1: Belles de Jour
2011	À la recherche du temps perdu	Nina Companeez	Robert de Saint-Loup	
2011	Le Destin de Rome	Fabrice Hourlier	Octave	
2011	L'Amour fraternel	Gérard Vergez	Henri	
2015	Don Juan & Sganarelle	Vincent Macaigne	The party guy	
2016	Les Petits Meurtres d'Agatha Christie	Éric Woreth	Adrien Sauvignac	Season 2, episode 15: La Mystérieuse affaire de Styles
2017	Bonaparte : La Campagne d'Egypte	Fabrice Hourlier	Desaix	Mini series
2017	Mystère au Louvre	Léa Fazer	Pierre Gamblin	Mini series

== Theatre ==
Year	Title	Playwright	Director	Role	Venue & Notes
2004	A Month in the Country	Ivan Turgenev	-	Beliaev	
2004	Bajazet	Jean Racine	-	Bajazet	
2005	Caligula	Albert Camus	Charles Berling	Caligula	Théâtre de l'Atelier
2010	Chéri	Colette	Robert Carsen	-	
2010–2013	Silenzio	Véronique Caye	Véronique Caye		French tour venues: Chartreuse in Villeneuve-lès-Avignon, Numerica (Montbéliard), Centre des Arts in Enghien-les-Bains, La Filature (Mulhouse), Le Pavillon Noir (Aix-en-Provence).
2021	The Normal Heart	Larry Kramer	Virginie de Clausade	-	Théâtre du Rond-Point
