= Pocket money =

Pocket money may refer to:

- In British English, an allowance for children
- Pocket Money, a 1972 film starring Paul Newman and Lee Marvin
- Small Change (film), a 1976 film directed by François Truffaut, titled Pocket Money outside the United States
- Operation Pocket Money, a U.S. Navy aerial mining campaign during the Vietnam War
