= Le Beau Mariage =

1982 film by Éric Rohmer

- Theatrical release poster
- Directed by: Éric Rohmer
- Written by: Éric Rohmer
- Produced by: Margaret Ménégoz
- Starring: Béatrice Romand; André Dussollier; Arielle Dombasle; Thamila Mezbah; Féodor Atkine; Vincent Gauthier
- Cinematography: Bernard Lutic
- Edited by: Cécile Decugis
- Music by: Ronan Girre; Simon des Innocents
- Production companies: Les Films du Losange; Les Films du Carrosse
- Distributed by: Acteurs Auteurs Associés
- Release date: 19 May 1982
- Running time: 97 minutes
- Country: France
- Language: French

Le Beau Mariage (lit. 'The Good Marriage') is a 1982 French romantic comedy-drama film written and directed by Éric Rohmer, starring Béatrice Romand, André Dussollier, Arielle Dombasle and Féodor Atkine. It follows a young art history student (Romand) who swears off affairs with married men in favor of finding a husband, and soon pursues a successful and single lawyer (Dussollier).

The film is the second instalment in Rohmer's "Comedies & Proverbs" (Comédies et Proverbes) series. It opens with a proverb by Jean de La Fontaine: "Quel esprit ne bat la campagne? Qui ne fait château en Espagne?" ("Who doesn't daydream? Who doesn't build castles in the air?").

== Plot ==
Sabine, a 25-year-old art history student, travels between Paris, where she studies, Le Mans, where she works as a saleswoman in an antique shop, and Ballon, where she lives with her mother and younger sister. She is having an affair with a married painter, Simon. One evening, while they are having sex in Simon's studio in Paris, they are interrupted by a phone call from his wife and son. Tired of being a mistress, Sabine ends her affair with Simon and impulsively decides to get married, though she does not yet know who her husband will be.

Returning to Le Mans, Sabine informs her best friend, Clarisse, of her decision to get married. At her own brother's wedding party, Clarisse introduces Sabine to her cousin Edmond, a wealthy, handsome and single 35-year-old Parisian lawyer. The two become acquainted before Edmond abruptly leaves. The next day, convinced that Sabine and Edmond have fallen in love at first sight, Clarisse urges Sabine to make the first move, but Sabine declares that if Edmond likes her, he will find a way to see her.

Ultimately, Sabine calls Edmond, who is looking for a porcelain vase for his mother. She suggests that they go together to a porcelain saleswoman, who is a customer of Sabine's boss. After completing the purchase, Edmond invites Sabine to lunch at a restaurant, where she tries to attract his interest and mainly discusses her desire to pursue a job that she enjoys and not just to make money. Afterwards, as they leave the restaurant, she briefly rests her head on Edmond's chest.

Sabine tells Clarisse that she is waiting for Edmond to call her, insisting that although she can seduce any man she wants, she wants Edmond to want to marry her. At work, Sabine's boss scolds her for doing business with the porcelain saleswoman. Enraged, Sabine resigns and announces her plans to get married. In a local church, she encounters an old fling, Claude, who is now married. Claude takes Sabine to his apartment, where she tells him about her marriage plans and her intention to stop working once she is married. He finds it degrading that her only ambition is to be a housewife.

When Sabine informs her mother of her plans to marry Edmond, her mother questions Sabine's old-fashioned ideas due to her refusal to engage in premarital sex, suggesting that they should live together before marrying, but is happy for her daughter. After an unsuccessful attempt to meet with Edmond in Paris, Sabine invites him to her birthday party. When Edmond finally arrives towards the end of the party, Sabine takes him to her bedroom, where he seemingly reciprocates her advances until her sister accidentally interrupts them. Edmond announces that he has to leave, citing a business trip the following morning, which upsets Sabine.

In the following days, Sabine repeatedly tries to call Edmond's office, leaving messages through his secretary, but he never calls her back. She shows up unannounced at Edmond's office, where he apologizes for leaving Sabine's birthday party suddenly, and tells her that although he considers her attractive, he is not in love with her. He also explains that he is not interested in emotional attachments because he has just come out of a stormy relationship and wants to focus on his career. Visibly upset, Sabine lashes out at Edmond and storms off, arguing with one of his clients on her way out.

Back in Le Mans, Sabine confides in Clarisse that, deep down, she was never truly in love with Edmond. Sabine later takes the train to Paris and sits across from a young man who notices her and smiles.

== Cast ==
- Béatrice Romand as Sabine
- André Dussollier as Edmond
- Féodor Atkine as Simon
- Arielle Dombasle as Clarisse
- Huguette Faget as Maryse, the antique dealer
- Thamila Mezbah as Sabine's mother
- Sophie Renoir as Lise, Sabine's sister
- Hervé Duhamel as Frédéric
- Pascal Greggory as Nicolas, Clarisse's brother
- Virginie Thévenet as the bride, Nicolas' wife
- Denise Bailly as the countess
- Vincent Gauthier as Claude
- Anne Mercier as the secretary
- Catherine Rethi as the client
- Patrick Lambert as the traveler

== Release ==
The film is available in the United States via the Xfinity streaming service.

== Reception ==
On the review aggregator website Rotten Tomatoes, the film holds an approval rating of 85% based on 13 reviews, with an average rating of 6.9/10. FrenchFilms.org gave it 4 out of 5.

Tom Milne of Sight & Sound wrote: "It was perhaps high time that one of the delightful women who have led Rohmer's heroes such a teasing dance was put in her place." Vincent Canby of The New York Times wrote: "The scope of Le Beau Mariage is limited, but everything within it is well-defined and magically, unexpectedly, illuminating."
