= Catherine de Heilbronn =

- Based on: Das Käthchen von Heilbronn by Heinrich von Kleist
- Written by: Éric Rohmer
- Directed by: Éric Rohmer
- Starring: Pascale Ogier; Pascal Greggory
- Country of origin: France
- Original language: French

Production
- Cinematography: Francis Junek
- Editor: Thérèse Sonntag
- Running time: 138 mins

Original release
- Network: Antenne 2
- Release: 1980

Catherine de Heilbronn is a 1980 French TV film made by Éric Rohmer for the television channel Antenne 2. It is a recording of Rohmer's stage production of the play Das Käthchen von Heilbronn by Heinrich von Kleist at the Théâtre des Amandiers in 1979. The cast includes Pascale Ogier, Arielle Dombasle, Marie Rivière, Jean-Marc Bory and Pascal Greggory.

== Plot ==
In the Middle Ages, the earl Wetter von Strahl is accused of having bewitched Catherine, the daughter of the gunsmith of Heilbronn; the earl tries to exonerate himself in the interrogation of the young woman.

== Cast ==
- Pascale Ogier as Catherine de Heilbronn
- Pascal Greggory as Friedrich Wetter, comte Strahl
- Arielle Dombasle as Kunigunde de Thurneck
- Jean-Marc Bory as Theobald Friedeborn
- Marie Rivière as Brigitte
