= Didier Sandre =

French actor (born 1946)

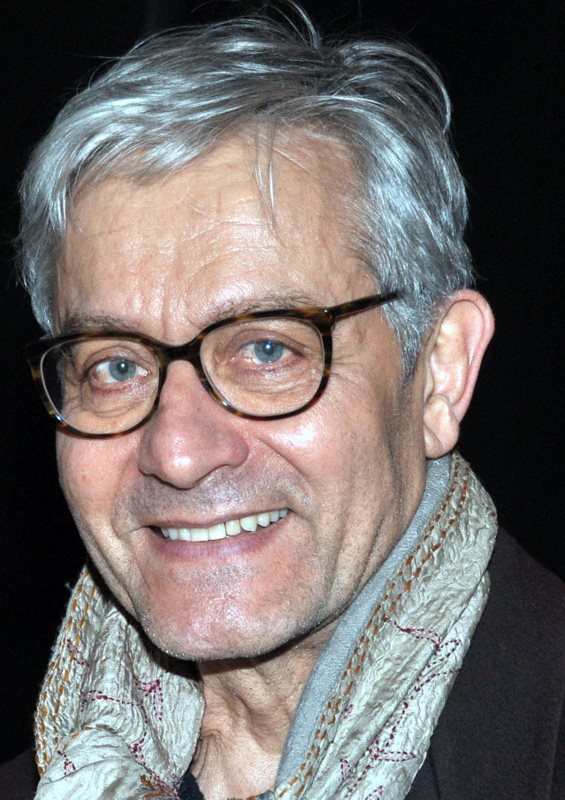
- Born: 17 August 1946 (age 80); Paris, France
- Occupation: Actor
- Years active: 1973-present

Didier Sandre (born 17 August 1946) is a French actor. He appeared in more than sixty films since 1973. He was appointed a member of the Comédie-Française in 2013.

== Selected filmography ==
| Year | Title | Role | Notes |
|---|---|---|---|
| 1986 | The Woman of My Life | Xavier | |
| 1994 | Coming to Terms with the Dead | Vincent | |
| 1998 | Autumn Tale | Étienne | |
| 2011 | À la recherche du temps perdu | Baron de Charlus | TV |
| 2012 | One Night | Lacourt | |
| 2013 | Under the Rainbow | Guillaume Casseul | |
| 2014 | Not My Type | Clément's father | |
| 2019 | An Officer and a Spy | Raoul Le Mouton de Boisdeffre | |
