= Eric Rohmer's Film Theory (1948–1953) =

2018 book by Marco Grosoli

- Author: Marco Grosoli
- Language: English
- Publisher: Amsterdam University Press
- Publication date: 16 April 2018
- Publication place: Netherlands
- Pages: 301
- ISBN: 9789462985803

Eric Rohmer's Film Theory (1948–1953): From 'école Scherer' to 'politique des auteurs' is a 2018 book by the film-studies scholar Marco Grosoli. It is a study of the French filmmaker Éric Rohmer's early writings on cinema, his role as the informal leader of the circle around the magazine Cahiers du Cinéma, and a reevaluation of the auteur theory that came out of this milieu, which Grosoli argues is based on much more nuanced writings than it later has been given credit for.
