= Madeleine Castaing =

French antique dealer and designer

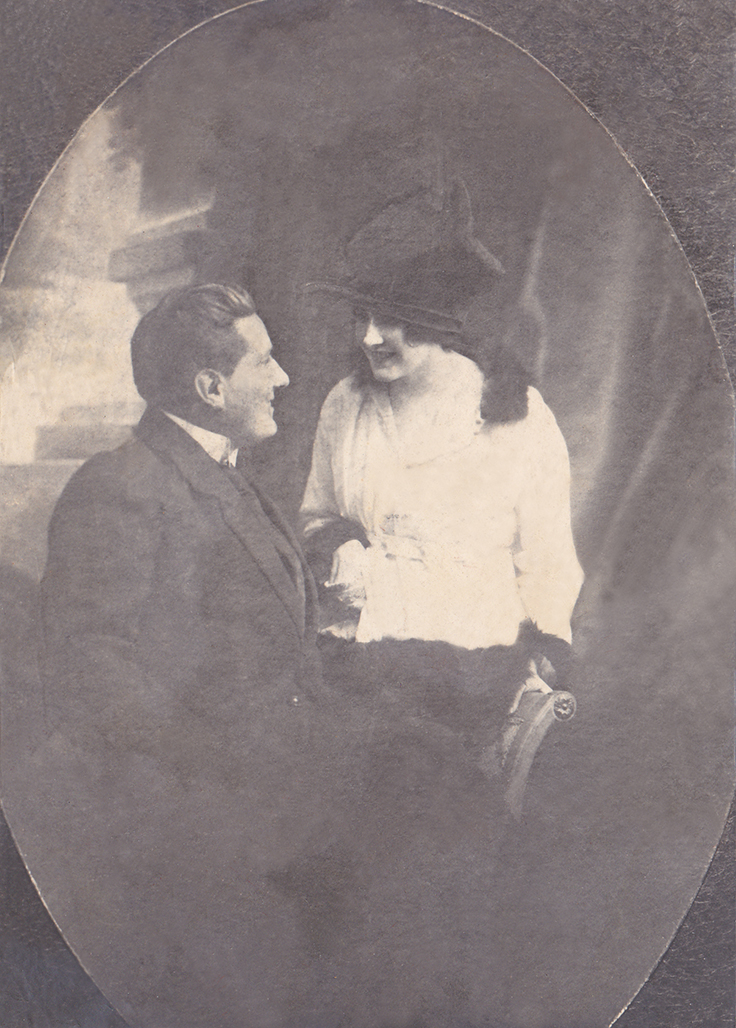
- Marcellin and Madeleine Castaing in the 1920s
- Born: Marie Madeleine Marcelle Magistry; 19 December 1894; Chartres
- Died: 17 December 1992 (aged 97); 6th arrondissement of Paris
- Occupation: Art collector
- Spouse(s): Marcellin Castaing

Madeleine Castaing (French pronunciation: [madlɛn kastɛ̃], née Magistry; 1894–1992) was a French antiques dealer and interior designer of international renown. She was the friend and the sponsor of many artists, including Soutine, who made her portrait in 1928. Original, even whimsical, she revolutionized the world of decoration, creating the style Castaing which is now a reference.

== Debuts ==
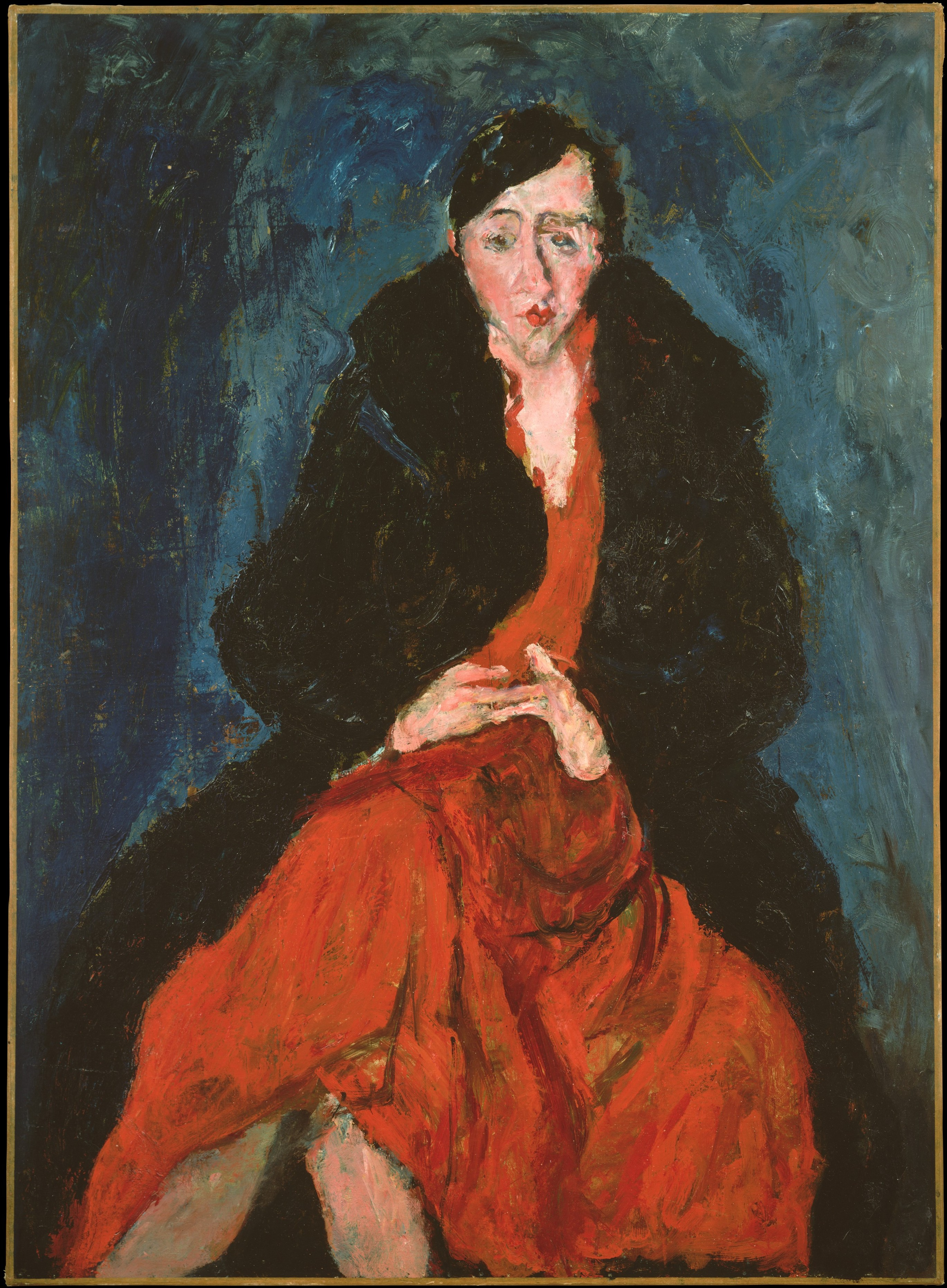
Portrait of Madeleine Castaing by Chaïm Soutine, ca. 1929, at The Metropolitan Museum of Art

The daughter of an engineer who built the train station in Chartres, Madeleine Magistry early married an heir from Toulouse, the art critic Marcellin Castaing. Their very romantic meeting had been concluded by her "kidnapping"; she was barely fifteen or sixteen at the time. Twenty years older than she was, Marcellin Castaing was known for his impressive literary and artistic culture. During the fifty years of their marriage, he remained his wife's great love, according to all the couple's friends, including the writer and photographer François-Marie Banier, who remembers "Madeleine's legendary love for her husband".

In the 1920s, Madeleine Castaing made her débuts as an actress in silent films; then gave up the career while being already nicknamed "the French Mary Pickford".

At that time, her husband had offered her a neoclassical manor that she had been longing for, in Lèves, not far from Chartres, where he wanted for her to "unwind", he explained. The young woman had indeed discovered her own vocation for interior design.

== Sponsorship ==
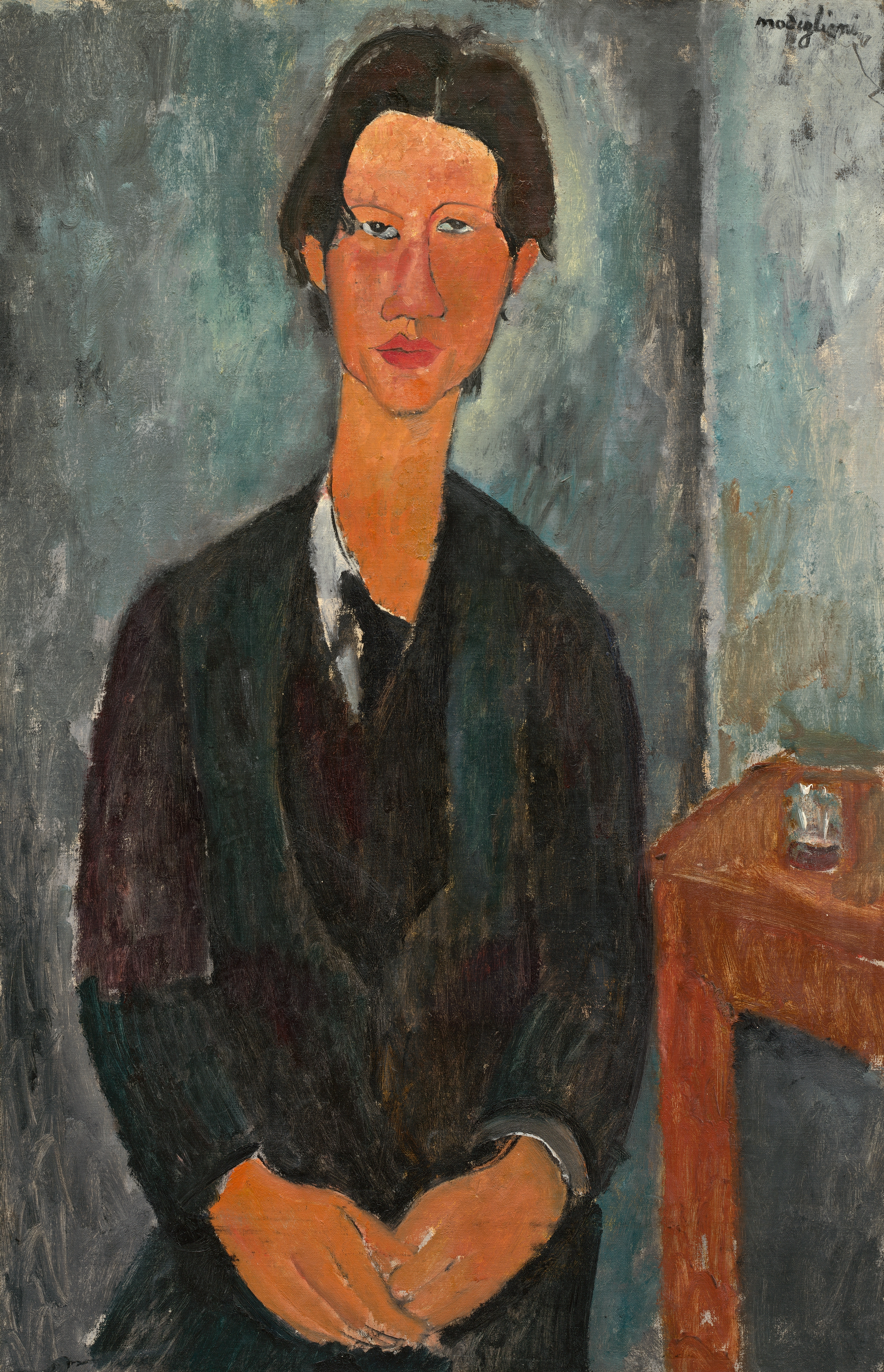
Soutine by Modigliani

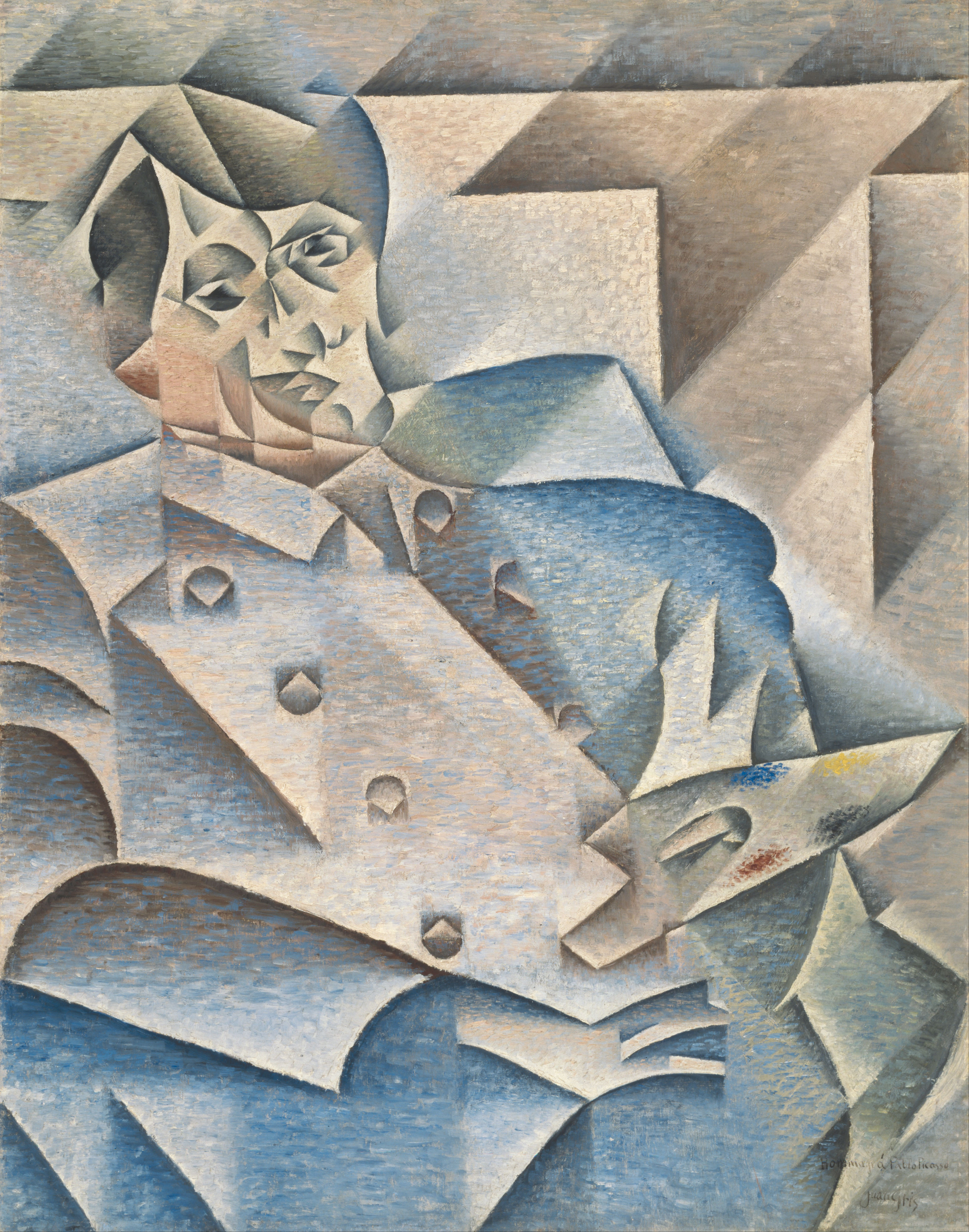
Picasso by Juan Gris

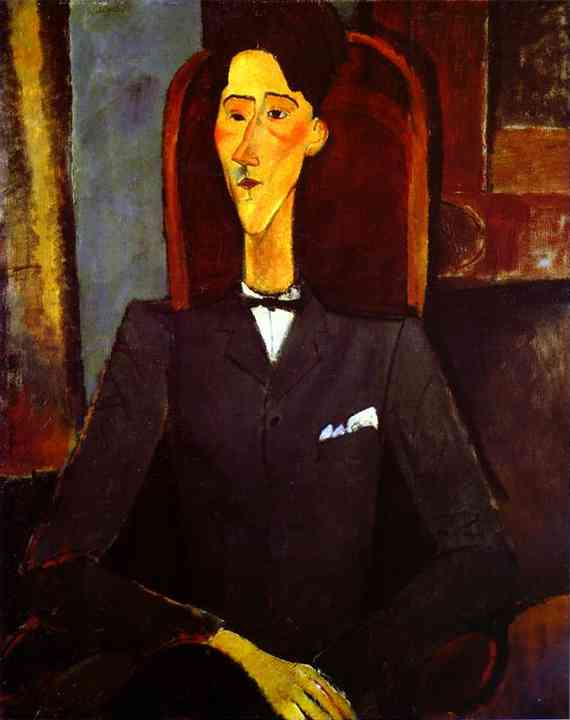
Cocteau by Modigliani

Shortly after their friend Modigliani's death, the Castaings made the acquaintance of Soutine at the Café de la Rotonde in Montparnasse. The first meeting was difficult. Soutine refused the 100 franc note handed to him by Marcellin Castaing for a painting that Castaing had not even looked at it. A few years later, in 1925, the Castaings could buy their first painting by this artist at Leopold Zborowski's, the primary art dealer of Soutine and of Modigliani, and became friends with him. From 1930 to 1935, he was a guest during the summer in their mansion in Lèves. They became the patrons and main buyers of Zborowski. Thanks to them, Soutine could hold his first exhibition in Chicago in 1935.

The Castaings possessed more than 40 paintings by this artist, which became the most important private collection of Soutine's works. Madeleine Castaing considered that he was the greatest painter of the 20th century. "Above others, he gives his hand to the Greco and Rembrandt", she claimed.

Madeleine Castaing's portrait by Soutine, La Petite Madeleine des décorateurs, is now at The Metropolitan Museum of Art in New York. The words petite madeleine refer to the petite madeleine of Proust, an author whom Madeleine Castaing was especially interested; she spent decades reading In Search of Lost Time again and again, fully, several times. She had discovered this work in 1913.

Generally speaking, the Castaings were patrons of artists belonging to the École de Paris and to the Académie de la Grande Chaumière.

Madeleine Castaing was a friend of Erik Satie, Maurice Sachs, Blaise Cendrars, André Derain, Jean Cocteau (arranging his house in Milly-la-Forêt), Marc Chagall, Iché, Picasso, Henry Miller, Louise de Vilmorin (to whom she inspired the character of Julietta in the novel of the same name), and Francine Weisweiller (for whom she decorated the Villa Santo Sospir in Saint-Jean-Cap-Ferrat). In the 1970s, she helped François-Marie Banier by purchasing a dozen of his photographs for 70,000 francs.

The historian and politician Michel Castaing (1918–2004), the Castaings' younger son, was a famous expert in paleography. Michel's son, Frédéric Castaing, is a specialist in autographs and also a novelist.

When Michel Castaing died in 2004, the family mansion in Lèves was sold at auction by Sotheby's, as well as the family collection of paintings and art objects, including seven paintings by Soutine. Count Bruno de Caumont, artistic director at Edmond Petit, the company who edits Madeleine Castaing’s fabrics, and an expert of her style, arranged the items to be sold into decoration scenes.

== Bibliography ==
=== Books ===
- (in English) Emily Evans Eerdmans (2010). The World of Madeleine Castaing. Rizzoli. ISBN 978-0-8478-3281-1. (prefaces by Jacques Grange and Frédéric Castaing)
- (in French) Pierre Levallois et al., La Décoration (5e volume de la collection « Connaissance des Arts », 1963, p. 60)
- (in French) Jean-Noël Liaut, Madeleine Castaing, Mécène à Montparnasse, décoratrice à Saint-Germain-des-Prés, Payot, 2008
- (in English) Lisa Lovett-Smith, Paris Interiors, Taschen
- (in French) Patrick Mauriès et Christian Lacroix, Styles d'aujourd'hui, Gallimard/Le Promeneur, 1995
- (in French) Barbara et René Stoeltie, Chez Elles : le décor au féminin, Flammarion, 2003, pp. 13 à 19
- (in English) Suzanne Trocmé, Influential Interiors, Michtell Beazley, 1999
- (in English) Adam Lewis, The Great Lady Decorators: The Women Who Defined Interior Design, 1870-1955, Rizzoli, New York, 2010

=== Reviews ===
- (in French) Hervé Joubeaux et Pierre Falicon, Le Temps retrouvé chez Madeleine Castaing, photographies de Claire Flanders, musée des Beaux-Arts, Chartres, 1997
- (in French) Hervé Leroux, « L'appartement de Madeleine Castaing », Maison française n° 509, 2000
- (in Spanish) Anne de Royère, « Madeleine Castaing, Lla Mujer de los azules », Casas e Gente, septembre 2004
- (in English) Barbara Stoeltie, « Au revoir, Lèves », photographs by René Stoeltie, The World of Interiors, 2004
- (in English) Catalog of Soutine Exhibition (1963), Tate Gallery, London
- (in French) Catalogue de l'exposition François-Marie Banier, « Madeleine Castaing », Maison européenne de la photographie, Paris, 2003
- (in French) Catalogue Sotheby's, L'Univers de Madeleine Castaing, Galerie Charpentier, Paris, septembre-octobre 2004

== Filmography ==
- The Proprietor, film by Ismail Merchant with Jeanne Moreau and Sean Young (1996), filmed in Madeleine Castaing's apartment
- Madeleine Castaing et Peggy Guggenheim, television documentary directed by Benjamin Roussel, France 5 (2006) for the series Le Bal du siècle, produced by Jean-Louis Remilleux
- Madeleine Castaing, documentary by Christopher Flach, New York City (2006)
