= Autumn Tale =

1998 film by Éric Rohmer

- Theatrical release poster
- French: Conte d'automne
- Directed by: Éric Rohmer
- Written by: Éric Rohmer
- Produced by: Françoise Etchegaray
- Starring: Béatrice Romand; Marie Rivière; Didier Sandre; Alain Libolt; Alexia Portal; Stéphane Darmon; Aurélia Alcaïs
- Cinematography: Diane Baratier
- Edited by: Mary Stephen
- Production companies: Les Films du Losange; La Sept Cinéma; Rhône-Alpes Cinéma
- Distributed by: Les Films du Losange
- Release dates: 7 September 1998 (Venice); 23 September 1998 (France)
- Running time: 112 minutes
- Country: France
- Language: French
- Budget: $2.8 million
- Box office: $2.2 million

Autumn Tale (French: Conte d'automne) is a 1998 French romantic comedy-drama film written and directed by Éric Rohmer, starring Béatrice Romand, Marie Rivière, Didier Sandre, Alain Libolt, Alexia Portal, Stéphane Darmon and Aurélia Alcaïs. It is the fourth and final instalment in Rohmer's Tales of the Four Seasons series, which also includes A Tale of Springtime (1990), A Tale of Winter (1992) and A Summer's Tale (1996).

== Plot ==
Winemaker and widow, Magali (Béatrice Romand) is 45 years old and absorbs herself in her vineyards to distract herself from her loneliness. Her good friends Rosine (Alexia Portal) and Isabelle (Marie Rivière), individually concoct plans to get her dating again, but using their own social abilities to lure the men into their plans. Isabelle finds an appropriate middle-aged man named Gerald (a widower himself) on a dating service and makes first contact. Magali refuses to use personal ads to meet men, and her work has prevented her from having any personal life, so Isabelle has to continuously go out on dates with Gerald to warm him up.

Rosine uses her youth and sexuality as a lure with her older university professor, Etienne, who is hoping to have a relationship with the younger student. As both couples' relationships advance, both women reveal that the plan all along was to have them date Magali-presenting a picture of her. Both men are taken aback at the deception, but find themselves curious enough to meet her.

Both independent plans come to their conclusion at the wedding of Isabelle's daughter, when Rosine's professor shows more interest in another youthful woman from the school. Magali meets Gerald at the wine table and they instantly create a bond discussing their Northern African experiences and lives in the winery business. Milling around the wedding, Gerald runs into Isabelle and they move to a quieter location to discuss how the first meeting unfolded. When Isabelle hugs Gerald, Magali opens the door on the couple by accident and sees the embrace. Despondent, Magali reverts into her anti-social behavior, disappointed that her friend is having an affair with a man she was connecting with.

Magali wants to leave the wedding, but her son takes the car, so she is dependent on getting a ride home. Isabelle and Gerald, not knowing that Magali had seen them hugging, offer a ride to her. On the ride home, Magali gets into an argument with the confused Gerald, who is forced to drop her off at a remote train station near Orange.

After waiting for hours, Magali gives up on the train and takes a taxi back to the wedding-hoping her son has returned the car.

Gerald also has returned to the wedding, which is near ending, to complain and tell Isabelle about the incident with Magali.

As the two converge on Isabelle, the plot is revealed and Isabelle says that the presumption of the affair with Gerald was impossible as she loves her husband. Magali and Gerald begin to laugh and decide to make another try, without all the confusing deception, at her Fall harvest party later in the month.

== Cast ==
- Béatrice Romand as Magali
- Marie Rivière as Isabelle
- Didier Sandre as Étienne
- Alain Libolt as Gérald
- Alexia Portal as Rosine
- Stéphane Darmon as Léo
- Aurélia Alcaïs as Émilia

== Themes ==
Autumn is traditionally the time to harvest wine grapes as the cooling begins. The grapes are mature and have the correct balance of sugar for fermentation. Thematically also representative of advancing age, where middle-aged adults are approaching the second half of their lives with a balance of romanticism, pragmatism and ambition. Rohmer uses Rosine's ambitious and naïve assumptions and compares it to the older Isabelle's practicality and softer approach to find the right person for Magali.

== Reception ==
Sight & Sound called it a "beautiful, witty and serene film" which "never falls into the talking-heads trap. Encounters in cars, cafés, gardens and restaurants are visually dramatised, allowing the characters' philosophies (the action of the film, as it were) to be expressed dynamically. And this literary emphasis on language, something of a cliché with Rohmer, and the simplicity of the mise en scène rest on tight plotting in the tradition of Rohmer's master, Hitchcock."

Stephen Holden, in excerpts re-published after the film's New York City opening but originally written after the film's appearance as part of the 1998 New York Film Festival, called the film "as sublimely warming an experience as the autumn sun that shines benevolently on the vineyard owned by the film's central character, Magali (Beatrice Romand)"; although the film has its "labored moments" and "except for a twist here and there, you know where the story is going to go", the film nevertheless "evokes such a sensuous atmosphere — bird song, wind and light and shadow that delineate the season and time of day with an astonishing precision — that you are all but transported into Magali's fields, where this year's grapes promise to yield an especially fine vintage."

The Boston Review said "The Autumn Tale... outshines its [Tales of Four Seasons] predecessors....Throughout this film one senses that both the characters and the audience are in the hands of a great psychologist–if one knew more about the Rhône Valley, its old towns and its new factories, one would appreciate even more how Rohmer's women are suited to their local social reality, which is filmed as carefully as they are."

Roger Ebert gave the film four stars out of four, saying "Even though I enjoy Hollywood romantic comedies like Notting Hill, it's like they wear galoshes compared to the sly wit of a movie like Autumn Tale. They stomp squishy-footed through their clockwork plots, while Rohmer elegantly seduces us with people who have all of the alarming unpredictability of life."

== Awards ==
The film won the Golden Osella ("Best Screenplay") at the 55th Venice International Film Festival. It was selected as the 1999 Best Foreign Language Film by the National Society of Film Critics.

== DVD release ==
In the United Kingdom, a region 2 DVD was released by Artificial Eye, with English subtitles and an interview with the writer/director.
