= The Green Ray (film) =

1986 film by Éric Rohmer

- Theatrical release poster
- French: Le Rayon vert
- Directed by: Éric Rohmer
- Written by: Éric Rohmer; Marie Rivière (Note: Collaboration)
- Produced by: Margaret Ménégoz
- Starring: Marie Rivière; Vincent Gauthier; Rosette; Carita Holmström; Béatrice Romand; Lisa Hérédia
- Cinematography: Sophie Maintigneux
- Edited by: María Luisa García
- Music by: Jean-Louis Valéro
- Production company: Les Films du Losange
- Distributed by: Les Films du Losange
- Release dates: 29 August 1986 (United States); 3 September 1986 (France)
- Running time: 98 minutes
- Country: France
- Language: French
- Budget: 4 million F ($615,000)

The Green Ray (French: Le Rayon vert), released in North America as Summer, is a 1986 French romantic drama film written and directed by Éric Rohmer. It is the fifth instalment in Rohmer's "Comedies and Proverbs" series. The film was inspired by the novel of the same name by Jules Verne. It was shot in France on 16 mm film and much of the dialogue is improvised. The film won the Golden Lion and the FIPRESCI Prize at the 43rd Venice International Film Festival.

== Plot ==
At the start of summer vacation, Delphine has just suffered the breakup of a relationship and her traveling companion has ditched her so that her new boyfriend can accompany her to Greece instead. She is left without plans at a time when Paris is emptying for the summer. Another friend invites Delphine to join a beach party in Cherbourg for the weekend, but she finds that she is the only one amongst the group who is single so she quickly returns to Paris. Her family pressures her to spend the holidays with them in Ireland, but she resists. She travels alone to the Alps, but is put off by hordes of vacationers and turns around. Traveling restlessly, the theme of the movie (characterized by Roger Ebert) becomes clear: Delphine "is incapable of playing the dumb singles games that lead to one-night stands".

She meets a new girlfriend, who flirts with two young men and she flees in anger. She recoils from the chat-up lines of the guys she meets in bars and on trains. She simply cannot engage in that kind of mindless double-talk any longer. Beneath her boredom is genuine anger at the roles that single people are sometimes expected to play. While in Biarritz, she eavesdrops on a conversation about Jules Verne's novel Le Rayon vert (The Green Ray). According to Verne, when one sees a rare green flash at sunset, one's own thoughts and those of others are revealed as if by magic. At the Biarritz railway station she meets a young man who is travelling to Saint-Jean-de-Luz. She goes with him and together they observe le rayon vert (the green flash).

== Cast ==
- Marie Rivière as Delphine
- Amira Chemakhi as a friend of Delphine's in Paris
- Lisa Hérédia as Manuella in Paris
- Béatrice Romand as Béatrice in Paris
- Rosette as Françoise in Paris
- Eric Hamm as Édouard in Cherbourg
- Carita Holmström as Léna in Biarritz
- Marc Vivas as Pierrot in Biarritz
- Joël Comarlot as Joel in Biarritz
- Vincent Gauthier as Jacques in Biarritz

== Production ==
In 1980, Rohmer began a series of films each based on a proverb, the "Comedies and Proverbs". The fifth of the series was The Green Ray in 1986. The theme was given by a phrase from Arthur Rimbaud, Ah ! que le temps vienne / Où les cœurs s'éprennent ("Oh! May the time come when hearts fall in love"). As was becoming his custom in pre-production, Rohmer gathered his cast together to discuss the project and their characters and allowed each actor to invent their dialogue. Rohmer stated that lead actress Marie Rivière was "clearly freer because all the technicians were women. That created an intimacy and a closeness."

The film was shot chronologically and in 16 mm so as to be "as inconspicuous as possible, to have Delphine blend into the crowd as a way, ultimately, of accentuating her isolation". Rohmer also instructed his cinematographer, Sophie Maintigneux, to keep technical aspects of the shoot to a minimum so as to not interrupt or distract the actors. The film's only major expense was a trip to the Canary Islands to film the green rays there. Rohmer chose to premiere the film on Canal Plus, a pay-TV station that paid $130,000 for the film, which was one fifth of its budget. The experiment paid off when the film was a commercial success after being released three days after its initial broadcast.

== Reception ==
The Green Ray won the Golden Lion and the FIPRESCI Prize at the 43rd Venice International Film Festival. It was mostly praised by film critics, although Alain Robbe-Grillet wrote an unfavourable review, stating, "I didn't like it very much". In the 2012 Sight & Sound polls of the greatest films ever made, The Green Ray made the top-10 lists of six critics and three directors. Roger Ebert of the Chicago Sun-Times gave the film 3 out of 4 and wrote Rohmer "is interested in the times between the big moments, the times when boredom and disenchantment set in" and "Perhaps he believes that you can best judge a person's character by observing how they behave when they feel they are not being judged".

On review aggregator website Rotten Tomatoes, the film holds an approval rating of 94% based on 32 reviews, with an average rating of 8.6/10.

== Interpretation ==
Alex Clayton analyzes the use of the color green in the film, arguing that “ green consistently features as emblem and waymarker in the central character’s grasping for a route out of despondency.” Andrew Utterson argues that the film’s attempts to capture the elusive color green also reflects the transitioning material conditions of film.
