= Présentation ou Charlotte et son steak =

1951 film by Éric Rohmer

Présentation ou Charlotte et son steak is a French short drama film written and directed by Éric Rohmer in 1951 and post-synchronised in 1961. It features Jean-Luc Godard and the voices of Stéphane Audran and Anna Karina.

== Plot ==
In a Swiss village in winter, Walter is walking with Charlotte, who is about to leave the country, when they meet Clara. Walter introduces Clara to Charlotte, hoping Charlotte will become jealous. When Clara walks away, Charlotte continues to her house, and Walter follows her, though she does not want him to. She fries herself a steak and gives Walter a piece, reminding him that she did not invite him over to eat when he asks for some bread. He tells her to kiss him, but she refuses, suggesting he kiss Clara. He says he prefers her, but Charlotte just continues to eat, and then cleans up. As she prepares to leave, she notices Walter is trembling, and he kisses her. He asks if she knows how much he loves her, and says he will be faithful to her while she is gone. Unswayed by his romanticism, Charlotte kisses Walter, before saying she thinks they both know that they do not love each other. Walter walks Charlotte to the station to catch her train.

== Cast ==
- Jean-Luc Godard as Walter
- Anne Couderet as Charlotte (voiced by Stéphane Audran)
- Andrée Bertrand as Clara (voiced by Anna Karina)

== Production ==
Though Rohmer shot the film in 1951, it was not until 1961 that sound was added and it was blown up from 16mm stock to 35mm stock and released at the Journées internationales du court métrage.

== Reception ==
The film is considered a precursor of the Nouvelle Vague, as it was shot on location in black-and-white with a hand-held camera and amateur actors, and, in Godard and Rohmer, united two major figures of the movement.
