= Hitchcock: The First Forty-Four Films =

1957 book by Éric Rohmer and Claude Chabrol

- Authors: Éric Rohmer; Claude Chabrol
- Original title: Hitchcock
- Translator: Stanley Hochman
- Language: French
- Subject: Alfred Hitchcock
- Publisher: Éditions Universitaires
- Publication date: 1957
- Publication place: France
- English publication date: 1979
- Pages: 184

Hitchcock: The First Forty-Four Films (original French title: Hitchcock) is a 1957 book by the French film critics Éric Rohmer and Claude Chabrol. It is a study of the films of the English director Alfred Hitchcock. Hitchcock was highly regarded by the critics-filmmakers of the French New Wave, to which Rohmer and Chabrol belonged. The book was the first major study of Hitchcock as a serious filmmaker.

An English translation of the book was published in 1979. Its focus on ethics and theological issues had significant impact on early academic studies of Hitchcock's films. According to the film studies scholar John Orr in 2005, it "remains the best critical book on his work in any language".
