= Tribute to Eric Rohmer =

Tribute to Éric Rohmer
- Directed by: Jean-Luc Godard
- Release date: 8 February 2010 (Cinémathèque Française)
- Running time: 3.5 minutes
- Countries: France; Switzerland
- Language: French

Tribute to Éric Rohmer (French: Hommage à Éric Rohmer) (a.k.a. Maurice Schérer) is a short 2010 video commissioned by Les Films du Losange as a tribute to Éric Rohmer by his friend and former colleague Jean-Luc Godard, and is the work that directly precedes the release of the 2010 feature Film Socialisme in Godard's filmography. It was first presented at the Soirée en hommage à Éric Rohmer on 8 February 2010 at the Cinémathèque Française. The short film consists of various titles of articles that Rohmer wrote for Cahiers du Cinéma appearing on a black background as Godard's narration muses about brief, fragmented memories of Rohmer. It ends with a shot of Godard looking directly into the camera, the 16:9 image's aspect ratio suddenly squished into 4:3, as he finishes his monologue.
