= The Romance of Astrea and Celadon =

2007 film by Éric Rohmer

- Theatrical release poster
- French: Les Amours d'Astrée et de Céladon
- Directed by: Éric Rohmer
- Written by: Éric Rohmer
- Based on: L'Astrée by Honoré d'Urfé
- Produced by: Françoise Etchegaray; Jean-Michel Rey; Philippe Liégeois
- Starring: Andy Gillet; Stéphanie Crayencour; Cécile Cassel; Véronique Reymond; Rosette; Jocelyn Quivrin; Rodolphe Pauly; Mathilde Mosnier; Serge Renko
- Cinematography: Diane Baratier
- Edited by: Mary Stephen
- Music by: Jean-Louis Valero
- Production companies: Compagnie Éric Rohmer; Rezo Productions; BIM Distribuzione; Alta Producción
- Distributed by: Rezo Films (France); BIM Distribuzione (Italy); Alta Films (Spain)
- Release dates: 1 September 2007 (Venice); 2 September 2007 (Italy); 5 September 2007 (France); 7 September 2007 (Spain)
- Running time: 109 minutes
- Countries: France; Italy; Spain
- Language: French
- Box office: $386,621

The Romance of Astrea and Celadon (French: Les Amours d'Astrée et de Céladon) is a 2007 historical romantic comedy-drama film written and directed by Éric Rohmer and starring Andy Gillet and Stéphanie Crayencour. Based on Honoré d'Urfé's 17th-century novel L'Astrée, it is the final feature film directed by Rohmer. It was released in France on 5 September 2007.

== Plot ==
In 5th-century Gaul, shepherd Céladon falls in love with Astrée. Falsely believing that Céladon has been unfaithful to her, Astrée banishes him from her sight. Céladon throws himself into the river, but he is saved by a nymph. Céladon tries to meet Astrée again.

== Cast ==
- Andy Gillet as Céladon
- Stéphanie Crayencour as Astrée
- Cécile Cassel as Léonide
- Véronique Reymond as Galathée
- Rosette as Sylvie
- Jocelyn Quivrin as Lycidas
- Mathilde Mosnier as Phillis
- Rodolphe Pauly as Hylas
- Serge Renko as Adamas
- Arthur Dupont as Semyre
- Priscilla Galland as Amynthe

== Reception ==
On Rotten Tomatoes, the film holds an approval rating of 67% based on 42 reviews, with an average rating of 6.11/10. The website's critics consensus reads, "A disappointing melodrama with a pedestrian script and direction."

Peter Bradshaw of The Guardian gave the film 4 out of 5 stars, writing, "it is a quietly delightful film, that calmly puts its faith in poetry and idealism; it is performed with serene confidence and poise, and succeeds in being gently affecting, mysterious and often erotic."
