= A Tale of Winter =

1992 film by Éric Rohmer

- Theatrical release poster
- French: Conte d'hiver
- Directed by: Éric Rohmer
- Written by: Éric Rohmer
- Produced by: Margaret Ménégoz
- Starring: Charlotte Véry; Frédéric van den Driessche; Hervé Furic; Michel Voletti
- Cinematography: Luc Pagès
- Edited by: Mary Stephen
- Music by: Sébastien Erms
- Production companies: Les Films du Losange; Compagnie Éric Rohmer
- Distributed by: Les Films du Losange
- Release date: 29 January 1992 (France)
- Running time: 114 minutes
- Country: France
- Language: French
- Box office: $1.6 million

A Tale of Winter (French: Conte d'hiver; released in the United Kingdom as A Winter's Tale) is a 1992 French drama film written and directed by Éric Rohmer, and starring Charlotte Véry, Frédéric van den Driessche, Hervé Furic and Michael Voletti. It is the second instalment in Rohmer's "Contes des quatre saisons" ("Tales of the Four Seasons") series, which also includes A Tale of Springtime (1990), A Summer's Tale (1996) and Autumn Tale (1998). The film was entered into the 42nd Berlin International Film Festival.

== Synopsis ==
Prologue

During her summer holidays at the French coast, young Félicie falls in love and has a romantic relationship with Charles, a young and handsome cook. Charles is planning to work in the United States in the fall. Before they part, Félicie gives Charles her contact information at the train station. Nervous, she misremembers the name of the town she is moving to, and consequently, he cannot reach her.

Synopsis

Five years later, Félicie is raising Charles's daughter, Élise, in Paris with her mother. She maintains the slim hope she will meet Charles again while working at a hair salon managed by an older man, Maxence. Maxence and Félicie are having an affair, even though he is in a long-term relationship. Concurrently, she is dating Loïc, a librarian roughly Charles's age. Félicie feels she should commit to one of these men but does not love either of them as much as she loved Charles.

Maxence leaves his partner for Félicie and she follows him to Nevers, where the salon franchise has a new managerial role for him. While Félicie works, Élise languishes in the upstairs apartment and Maxence does not appear very fatherly or sympathetic. After two days, Félicie announces her dissatisfaction and intent to return to Paris. Maxence tries to dissuade her to no avail.

In Paris, she begins seeing Loïc again but is frank about her lack of romantic interest in him. Élise likes Loïc much more than Maxence. Loïc and Félicie attend a performance of Shakepeare's The Winter's Tale, which has several similarities to Félicie's circumstances. She is moved to tears by the play and discusses her reaction with Loïc. On New Year's Eve, she decides to go home with Élise rather than spend the evening with Loïc.

On the bus ride home, she sits across from a man and a woman. The man recognizes Félicie. It is Charles. Even Élise recognizes Charles from photos. After a brief conversation about how they lost contact with each other, Félicie spontaneously darts out of the bus. Charles chases after her and she explains that she presumed he was married to the woman. Charles tells her the woman is just a friend he sees in Paris and the family is joyously reunited. Charles joins Félicie's family for a New Year's dinner.

== Cast ==
- Charlotte Véry as Félicie
- Frédéric van den Driessche as Charles
- Michel Voletti as Maxence
- Hervé Furic as Loïc
- Ava Loraschi as Elise
- Christiane Desbois as Félicie's mother
- Rosette as Félicie's sister
- Jean-Luc Revol as brother-in-law
- Haydée Caillot as Edwige
- Jean-Claude Biette as Quentin
- Marie Rivière as Dora
- Claudine Paringaux as customer
- Roger Dumas as Leontes
- Danièle Lebrun as Paulina
- Diane Lepvrier as Hermione

== Themes ==
A watershed moment for Félicie is seeing The Winter's Tale. In the play, Queen Hermione, who has been accused of having an illegitimate daughter with another man, is put on trial and flees to Bohemia. Hermione dies of a broken heart, but is resurrected by the forgiveness of the King when he sees her statue begin to come alive. Félicie reawakens as a romantic and her practical persona melts. Both the play and the movie use a miraculous reunion as a final plotline.

Beach and winter scenes are juxtaposed. The summer setting's bright colors and easy lifestyle represent a flourishing relationship. Paris in winter is like the statue—gray, bundled up, restrained, and without freedom.

== Reception ==
On the review aggregator website Rotten Tomatoes, the film holds an approval rating of 95% based on reviews from 22 critics, with an average rating of 7.8/10.

Roger Ebert included A Tale of Winter in his "Great Movies" series in 2001, writing, "What pervades Rohmer's work is a faith in love—or, if not love, then in the right people finding each other for the right reasons. There is sadness in his work but not gloom." Vincent Canby of The New York Times wrote: "At least part of the comic appeal of Mr. Rohmer's work is the complete confidence, clarity and decisiveness with which he dramatizes the utter confusion of his emotionally besieged heroines." Hal Hinson of The Washington Post called it "a small work, but nearly perfect."

== Year-end lists ==
- Honorable mention – Mike Clark, USA Today
