= Rohmer in Paris =

2013 film directed by Richard Misek

- Directed by: Richard Misek
- Written by: Richard Misek
- Produced by: Richard Misek
- Cinematography: Richard Misek
- Edited by: Richard Misek
- Music by: Tatsujiro Oto
- Release date: 2013
- Running time: 67 minutes
- Country: United Kingdom
- Language: English

Rohmer in Paris is a 2013 British documentary film by Richard Misek. It is about the depictions of Paris in the films of Éric Rohmer, one of the key figures of the French New Wave. The documentary consists almost exclusively of footage from Rohmer's Paris-set films, creating what Mark Adams of Screen calls "a historical and cultural snapshot of the city, all essentially viewed though Rohmer's Nouvelle Vague prism".

Misek produced, wrote, directed and edited the film. It features original music by Tatsujiro Oto.
