= La Nuit porte-jarretelles =

- Directed by: Virginie Thévenet
- Written by: Virginie Thévenet
- Starring: Jezabel Carpi; Ariel Genet; Caroline Loeb; Patrick Bauchau; Arielle Dombasle; Amidou
- Cinematography: Alain Lasfargues
- Edited by: Jacqueline Mariani
- Music by: André Demay; Mikado; Virginie Thévenet
- Distributed by: Forum Distribution
- Release date: 20 March 1985
- Running time: 85 minutes
- Country: France
- Language: French

La Nuit porte-jarretelles (English title: The Night Wears Suspenders) is a 1985 French film directed by Virginie Thévenet. The film stars Jezabel Carpi, Ariel Genet and Arielle Dombasle.

== Synopsis ==
A young woman leads a timid and innocent young man in an initiation and exploration of Paris by night.

== Analysis ==
The film is an odd mixture, with Rohmerian cast and dialogues, mixed with a complacent night tour of the red-light districts of Paris, bordering on sexploitation.

La Nuit porte-jarretelles got a César Award nomination (Best First Work) in 1986.
