= The Taste for Beauty =

1984 book by Éric Rohmer

- Editor: Jean Narboni
- Author: Éric Rohmer
- Original title: Le Goût de la beauté
- Translator: Carol Volk
- Language: French
- Publisher: Éditions de l'Étoile
- Publication date: 1984
- Publication place: France
- English publication date: 1989
- Pages: 214
- ISBN: 2-86642-016-0

The Taste for Beauty (French: Le Goût de la beauté) is a collection of writings on cinema by the French journalist and filmmaker Éric Rohmer. It was edited by Jean Narboni and contains texts originally published in periodicals such as Cahiers du Cinéma, Les Temps modernes and Combat. The original edition contains material from 1948 to 1979; several revised editions have followed.

The book was first published in French by Éditions de l'Étoile in 1984 and in Carol Volk's English translation by Cambridge University Press in 1989. Reviewing the book for Film Quarterly in 1991, Gregg Rickman wrote it was "long overdue", published long after similar English-language anthologies of Jean-Luc Godard's and François Truffaut's writings, and called it "one of the most useful books published anywhere in the last few years". He described the English-language edition as "handsomely produced".
