= Élisabeth (novel) =

1946 novel by Maurice Schérer

- Author: Gilbert Cordier (Maurice Schérer a.k.a. Éric Rohmer)
- Translator: Aaron Kerner
- Language: French
- Publisher: Éditions Gallimard
- Publication date: 8 July 1946
- Publication place: France
- English publication date: 7 July 2026
- Pages: 234

Élisabeth is a 1946 novel by the French writer Maurice Schérer, published under the pen name Gilbert Cordier. It is set in northern France in the summer of 1939 and follows the personal dramas in and around a family, focusing on flirtations between teenagers.

It was Schérer's first and only published novel, appearing before he adopted the pseudonym Éric Rohmer, under which he became a well-known film critic at Cahiers du Cinéma and filmmaker in the French New Wave. Élisabeth received very little attention in France upon the original publication. Aaron Kerner's English translation was published in 2026.
