= The House of the Yellow Carpet =

- Directed by: Carlo Lizzani
- Screenplay by: Lucio Battistrada; Filiberto Bandini
- Based on: Teatro a Domicilio by Aldo Selleri
- Produced by: Filiberto Bandini
- Starring: Erland Josephson; Beatrice Romand; Vittorio Mezzogiorno
- Cinematography: Giuliano Giustini
- Edited by: Angela Cipriani
- Music by: Stelvio Cipriani
- Production companies: RPA; RAI2
- Release date: 1983
- Running time: 89 minutes
- Country: Italy

The House of the Yellow Carpet (Italian: La casa del tappeto giallo) is a 1983 Italian mystery film directed by Carlo Lizzani.

== Plot ==
Franca and her husband Antonio decide to sell a yellow rug which was a gift from Franca's stepfather. One day, while Antonio is out, a strange man responding to their advertisement rings saying he wishes to buy the rug. But the man's visit becomes a nightmare as he overstays his welcome. He kidnaps Franca and tells her he murdered his wife on that same yellow rug. Franca winds up killing the man.

== Cast ==
Cast adapted from Blood & Black Lace.

- Beatrice Romand as Franca
- Erland Josephson as Achille Cimatti
- Vittorio Mezzogiorno as Antonio
- Milena Vukotic as The Psychiatrist

== Production and style ==
The House of the Yellow Carpet was the first film by Carlo Lizzani after his four-year tenure as the director of the Venice Film Festival. The film was adapted from Aldo Selleri's 1978 radio play Teatro a domicilio and was adapted by Filiberto Bandini and Lucio Battistrada.

Film critic and historian Roberto Curti stated that despite promotional material suggested that the material was part of a "horror-thriller fad", that the film was closer to the gialli of the 1930s. Adrian Luther Smith, echoed this statement referring to the film as a psychological thriller, stating despite some more violent scenes, "the emphasis is on pulling the proverbial rug, er carpet from beneath the audience's feet."

== Release and reception ==
The House of the Yellow Carpet was released in 1983. It was released by Lightning video in the United States as The House of the Yellow Carpet.

Adrian Luther Smith, wrote in his book Blood & Black Lace that viewers "willing to accept a dose of strong black humor with your giallo, then you'll be able to stomach the eccentricities on offer here."

== See also ==
- List of Italian films of 1983
