= Perceval le Gallois =

1978 film by Éric Rohmer

- Theatrical release poster
- Directed by: Éric Rohmer
- Screenplay by: Éric Rohmer
- Based on: Perceval, the Story of the Grail by Chrétien de Troyes
- Produced by: Barbet Schroeder; Margaret Ménégoz
- Starring: Fabrice Luchini; André Dussollier
- Cinematography: Néstor Almendros
- Edited by: Cécile Decugis
- Music by: Guy Robert
- Production companies: Les Films du Losange; FR3
- Distributed by: Gaumont Distribution
- Release dates: 8 October 1978 (New York City); 7 February 1979 (France); 6 November 1979 (West Germany)
- Running time: 140 minutes
- Countries: France; Italy; West Germany
- Language: French

Perceval le Gallois (transl. Perceval the Welshman) is a 1978 historical drama film written and directed by Éric Rohmer, based on the 12th-century Arthurian romance Perceval, the Story of the Grail by Chrétien de Troyes.

== Synopsis ==
The film chronicles Percival's knighthood, maturation and eventual peerage amongst the Knights of the Round Table, and also contains brief episodes from the story of Gawain and the crucifixion of Christ.

== Cast ==
- Fabrice Luchini as Perceval
- André Dussolier as Gauvain
- Arielle Dombasle as Blanchefleur
- Marie Rivière as Garin's daughter
- Pascale de Boysson as widow lady

== Presentation ==
Unlike other screen adaptations of Arthurian legend, the film makes no attempt at situating the characters in a natural or supernatural world. Instead, Perceval and his cohorts inhabit a colorful theatrical realm replete with rudimentary props, stylized backdrops, and a singing chorus that participates in the drama. At many points, characters narrate their own actions and thoughts rather than expressing them manifestly, and dialog is frequently spoken lyrically in rhyming couplets taken directly from the original text. The film's deliberate artificiality, ironic vision of youthful valor, and frequently shifting narrative modes prevent emotional attachment to the story while leaving space for a more cerebral engagement with the elements of storytelling Rohmer has interpreted from 12th-century literature.
