= Béatrice Romand =

French actress (born 1952)

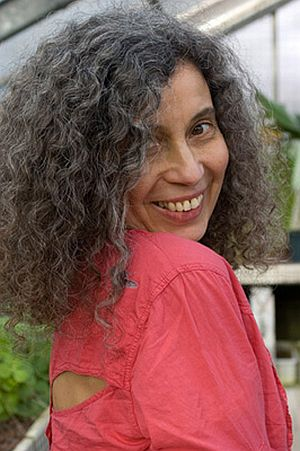
Image of Beatrice Romand

Béatrice Romand (born 1952, Birkhadem, French Algeria) is a French actress. She is best known for her work with director Éric Rohmer in such films as Claire's Knee, Love in the Afternoon, A Good Marriage, Le Rayon vert and Autumn Tale.

She also appeared on television in Graf Yoster gibt sich die Ehre, a German detective show.

== Selected filmography ==
Year	Title	Role	Director
1968	Mayerling	uncredited	Terence Young
1970	Claire's Knee	Laura	Éric Rohmer
1972	Love in the Afternoon	the woman in the dream	Éric Rohmer
1973	Themroc	Themroc's sister	Claude Faraldo
1974	Soft Beds, Hard Battles	Marie-Claude	Roy Boulting
1974	Le comte Yoster a bien l'honneur (TV show, 4th season only)	Charlie	miscellaneous
1975	The Romantic Englishwoman	Catherine	Joseph Losey
1982	Le Beau Mariage	Sabine	Éric Rohmer
1983	The House of the Yellow Carpet	Franca	Carlo Lizzani
1986	The Green Ray	Béatrice	Éric Rohmer
1987	Four Adventures of Reinette and Mirabelle	the female inspector	Éric Rohmer
1998	Autumn Tale	Magali	Éric Rohmer
