= Jacques Grange =

French interior designer

- Born: 27 June 1944 (age 82)
- Occupation: Interior designer

Jacques Grange (born 27 June 1944) is a French interior designer.

== Biography ==
After completing his training at the École Boulle and the École Camondo, Grange made a career as a decorator in France and abroad from the 1970s. His main customers included Yves Saint Laurent and Pierre Bergé, for whom he decorated the Château Gabriel, in Benerville-sur-Mer. The residence was previously owned by the publisher of Marcel Proust. As Saint Laurent was an admirer of Proust, Grange modelled the house around the themes of his great novel, In Search of Lost Time.

His usual customers include Isabelle Adjani, Princess Caroline of Monaco, Alain Ducasse, François Pinault, Robert Agostinelli, Valentino and Karl Lagerfeld. In New York City, he provided the decoration of jewelry shop of Paloma Picasso, of the Mark Hotel on Madison Avenue, and of the Barbizon Hotel.

His style is characterized by a harmony between traditional and contemporary tastes, with an assortment of styles that follows the line of Madeleine Castaing, who taught him the art of decoration.

In 1980, Grange acquired Colette's apartment, at the Palais-Royal in Paris. He rearranged it in order to make it his residence while respecting the spirit of the place.

== Bibliography ==
- Pierre Passebon, Jacques Grange, Éditions du Regard, 2008
