= Small Change (film) =

- Directed by: François Truffaut
- Written by: François Truffaut; Suzanne Schiffman
- Produced by: Marcel Berbert
- Starring: Jean-François Stévenin; Virginie Thévenet
- Cinematography: Pierre-William Glenn
- Edited by: Yann Dedet; Martine Barraqué-Curie
- Music by: Maurice Jaubert
- Production company: Les Films du Carrosse
- Distributed by: Les Artistes Associés
- Release date: 17 March 1976
- Running time: 105 minutes
- Country: France
- Language: French
- Box office: 2,071,040 admissions (France) $1.5 million (US)

Small Change (French: L'Argent de poche) is a 1976 French film directed by François Truffaut about childhood innocence and child abuse. In English-speaking countries outside North America, the film is known as Pocket Money. The film had a total of 1,810,280 admissions in France, making it one of Truffaut's most successful films. Only his films The 400 Blows and The Last Metro were more popular in France.

== Plot ==
Small Change is a story of the struggles and yearnings of young children in Thiers, France, in the summer of 1976. The main characters are Patrick Desmouceaux, who is motherless and just starts getting interested in women such as his young teacher, and his friend Julien Leclou, who lives in poverty and is physically abused at home. Julien cannot stay awake at school after nights without sleep and constantly refuses to change for gym class in order to hide his bruises. The film mixes the story of these characters with other more or less innocent childhood experiences and challenges of a number of children. Scenes include life at school, a toddler and a cat perilously playing on an open windowsill but falling down unhurt, a girl causing confusion with a bullhorn in an apartment window, Bruno showing his friends how to chat up girls, a double date at a movie theater, a child telling a dirty joke, a botched haircut, first love and first kisses.

In the end, Julien's abuse becomes public and he is taken away from his family. The story ends with the message of one of the teachers about child abuse, injustice, children's rights, hope, love and resilience: 'Of all mankind's injustices, injustice to children is the most despicable! Life isn't always fair, but we can fight for justice. [...] If kids had the right to vote, they would have better schools [...] Life isn't easy. You must learn to be tough. I don't mean 'gangster-tough'. What I mean is having endurance and resilience. [...] Time flies. Before long, you will have children of your own. If you love them, they will love you. If they don't feel you love them, they will transfer their love and tenderness to other people. Or to things. That's life! Each of us needs to be loved!'

== Cast ==
All young characters were acclaimed child actors at the time of filming:

Children

- Philippe Goldmann as Julien Leclou
- Bruno Staab as Bruno
- Geory Desmouceaux as Patrick Desmouceaux
- Laurent Devlaeminck as Laurent Riffle
- Sylvie Grezel as Sylvie
- Dov Prehn as Un élève Student
- Pascale Bruchon as Martine
- Claudio Deluca as Mathieu
- Franck Deluca as Frank
- Sebastien Marc as Oscar
- Richard Golfier a Richard
- Grégory as Little Grégory, a toddler

Adults

- Nicole Félix as Grégory's mother (as Nicole Felix)
- Chantal Mercier as Chantal Petit, the Schoolteacher
- Jean-François Stévenin as Jean-François Richet, the Schoolteacher
- Virginie Thévenet as Lydie Richet
- Tania Torrens as Nadine Riffle, hairdresser, Laurent's mother
- Francis Devlaeminck as Monsieur Riffle, hairdresser, Laurent's father
- René Barnerias as Monsieur Desmouceaux, Patrick's father
- Katy Carayon as Sylvie's Mother
- Jean-Marie Carayon as Police inspector, Sylvie's father
- Annie Chevaldonne as Nurse
- Michel Dissart as Monsieur Lomay, constable
- Michele Heyraud as Madame Deluca, Mathieu and Frank's mother
- Paul Heyraud as Monsieur Deluca, Mathieu and Frank's father
- Jeanne Lobre as Julien's grandmother (as Jane Lobre)
- Vincent Touly as Concierge
- Francois Truffaut as Martine’s father

== Production ==
Truffaut had been collecting anecdotes about children since the time of The 400 Blows. Some of the events were autobiographical, like his first kiss. By 1972, the script was only a ten-page synopsis. In the summer of 1974, Truffaut became more serious about the project and started developing it further. He and his co-writer did not create a standard script because he wanted the freedom to improvise. In April 1975, Truffaut did location scouting, settled on the town of Thiers, then started casting. The filming lasted from 17 July until October that same year. The original rough cut was three hours.

== Release ==
=== Box office ===
Small Change was popular at the box office, in France, the US, Germany, Scandinavia and Japan. It was the 17th most popular film of the year in France.

=== Critical acclaim ===
When released, Small Change amassed critical acclaim. It was nominated for a Golden Globe for Best Foreign Film. Vincent Canby, writing for the New York Times, called Small Change 'an original, a major work in minor keys' and Pauline Kael described it as 'that rarity, a poetic comedy that's really funny'. Roger Ebert named it his favorite of the year, calling it a 'magical film' and singled out the window-sill scene as 'Truffaut at his best'. Leonard Maltin gave the movie four stars (out of four) and called it 'wise, witty and perceptive'. Small Change was also entered into the 26th Berlin International Film Festival. It was nominated for Best Foreign Language Film by the US National Board of Review.
