= Margaret Ménégoz =

Film producer (1941–2024)

- Born: 21 April 1941; Budapest, Hungary
- Died: 7 August 2024 (aged 83); Montpellier, Occitania, France
- Occupation: Film producer
- Years active: 1976–2022

Margaret Ménégoz (born Margit Katalin Baranyai; 21 April 1941 – 7 August 2024) was a Hungarian-born German-French film producer. She produced more than 60 films since 1976. She was a member of the jury at the 40th Berlin International Film Festival. She was the longtime manager of the French film company Les Films du Losange, which she sold to Charles Gillibert and Alexis Dantec in 2021. She worked with Michael Haneke on several of his films, including Amour, which was nominated for the Academy Award for Best Picture in 2012. Ménégoz died in Montpellier, Occitania on 7 August 2024, at the age of 83.

== Selected filmography ==
- Perceval le Gallois (1978)
- Koko: A Talking Gorilla (1978)
- Le Pont du Nord (1981)
- The Lady of the Camellias (1981)
- The Aviator's Wife (1981)
- Le Beau Mariage (1982)
- Danton (1983)
- Pauline at the Beach (1983)
- Sheer Madness (1983)
- Liberty Belle (1983)
- Improper Conduct (1984)
- Full Moon in Paris (1984)
- Le tartuffe (1984)
- The Green Ray (1986)
- Boyfriends and Girlfriends (1987)
- The Possessed (1988)
- Europa Europa (1990)
- A Tale of Springtime (1990)
- A Tale of Winter (1992)
- Louis, the Child King (1993)
- A Summer's Tale (1996)
- The Season of Men (2000)
- Our Lady of the Assassins (2000)
- Time of the Wolf (2003)
- Hidden (2005)
- The White Ribbon (2009)
- Early One Morning (2011)
- Amour (2012)
- Une Enfance (2015)
- Amnesia (2015)
- Happy End (2017)
