= Rosette (actress) =

French actress and producer (born 1959)

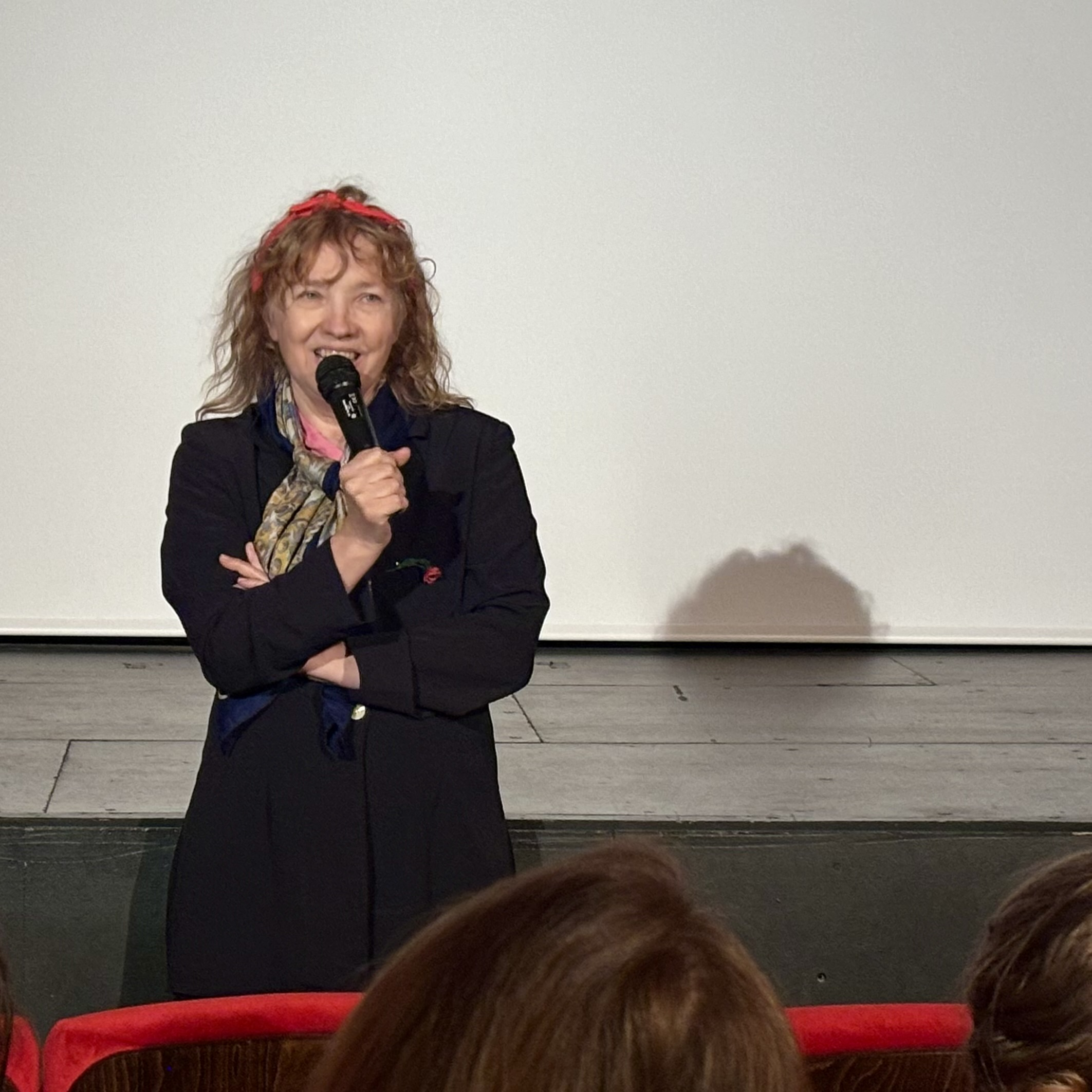
- Born: Françoise Quéré; September 6, 1959 (age 67); Cherbourg, Manche, France
- Occupations: Actress, producer
- Years active: 1979–2001

Rosette (real name Françoise Quéré; born 6 September 1959) is a French actress and producer.

== Roles ==
- Immoral Women (1979)
- Pauline at the Beach (1983)
- Exploits of a Young Don Juan (1986)
- The Green Ray (1986)
- A Tale of Winter (1992) : Irma
- The Lady and the Duke (2001)
- Let's Dance (2007)
- Diary of a Chambermaid (2015)

== Short films by Rosette ==
- Anniversaires (1997) with Isild Le Besco
- Les amis de Ninon (1998) with Isild Le Besco

== Production company ==
- Rosette sort le soir (1983) with Arielle Dombasle
- Rosette prend sa douche (1984) with Arielle Dombasle
- Rosette vend des roses (1985) with Virginie Thévenet and Pascale Ogier
- Rosette cherche une chambre (1987) with Virginie Thévenet and Amanda Langlet
