= Éric Rohmer =

French film director (1920–2010)

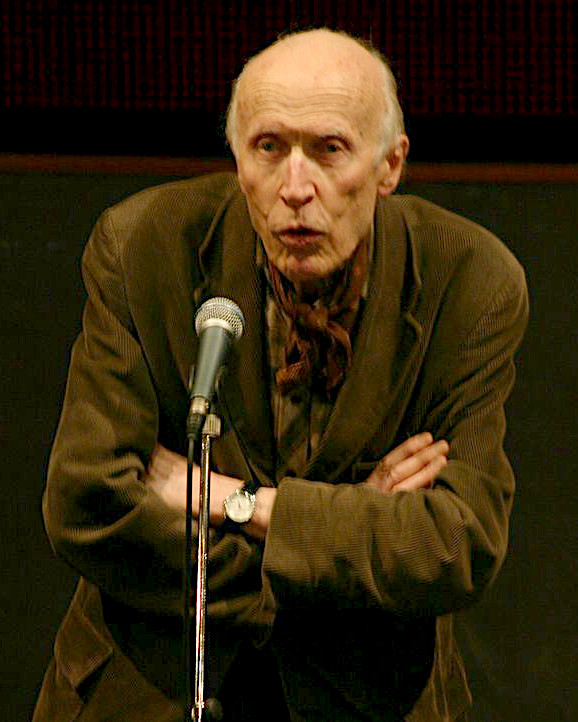
- Rohmer at the Cinémathèque Française in 2004
- Born: Maurice Henri Joseph Schérer or Jean Marie Maurice Schérer; 21 March 1920; Tulle, France
- Died: 11 January 2010 (aged 89); Paris, France
- Education: Université Paris I
- Occupations: Film director; journalist; teacher
- Years active: 1945–2009
- Spouse: Thérèse Schérer (m. 1957)
- Children: 2

Jean Marie Maurice Schérer or Maurice Henri Joseph Schérer, known as Éric Rohmer (French: [eʁik ʁomɛʁ]; 21 March 1920 (Note: Rohmer was obsessively private and gave out different dates of birth; other dates that appear in sources include 4 April 1920, 1 December 1920 and 4 April 1923.) – 11 January 2010), was a French film director, film critic, journalist, novelist, screenwriter, and teacher. Rohmer was the last of the post-World War II French New Wave directors to become established. He edited the influential film journal Cahiers du cinéma from 1957 to 1963, while most of his colleagues—among them Jean-Luc Godard and François Truffaut—were making the transition from critics to filmmakers and gaining international attention.

Rohmer gained international acclaim around 1969 when his film My Night at Maud's was nominated at the Academy Awards. He won the San Sebastián International Film Festival with Claire's Knee in 1971 and the Golden Lion at the Venice Film Festival for The Green Ray in 1986. In 2001, Rohmer received the Venice Film Festival's Career Golden Lion. After his death in 2010, his obituary in The Daily Telegraph called him "the most durable filmmaker of the French New Wave", outlasting his peers and "still making movies the public wanted to see" late in his career.

== Early life ==
Rohmer was born Jean-Marie Maurice Schérer (or Maurice Henri Joseph Schérer) in Nancy (also listed as Tulle), Meurthe-et-Moselle department, Lorraine, France, the son of Mathilde (née Bucher) and Lucien Schérer. Rohmer was a Catholic. He was secretive about his private life and often gave different dates of birth to reporters. He fashioned his pseudonym from the names of two famous artists: actor and director Erich von Stroheim and writer Sax Rohmer, author of the Fu Manchu series. Rohmer was educated in Paris and received an advanced degree in history, though he seemed equally interested in other subjects, also studying literature, philosophy, and theology.

== Career as a journalist ==
Rohmer first worked as a teacher in Clermont-Ferrand. In the mid-1940s he quit his teaching job and moved to Paris, where he worked as a freelance journalist. In 1946 he published a novel, Elisabeth (AKA Les Vacances) under the pen name Gilbert Cordier. While living in Paris, Rohmer first began to attend screenings at Henri Langlois's Cinémathèque Française, where he first met and befriended Jean-Luc Godard, François Truffaut, Claude Chabrol, Jacques Rivette and other members of the French New Wave. Rohmer had never been very interested in film, preferring literature, but soon became an intense lover of films and about 1949 switched from journalism to film criticism. Rohmer wrote film reviews for such publications as Révue du Cinéma, Arts, Temps Modernes and La Parisienne.

In 1950, he co-founded the film magazine La Gazette du Cinéma with Rivette and Godard, but it was short-lived. In 1951 Rohmer joined the staff of André Bazin's newly founded film magazine Cahiers du Cinéma, of which he became the editor in 1956. There, Rohmer established himself as a critic with a distinctive voice; fellow Cahiers contributor and French New Wave filmmaker Luc Moullet later remarked that, unlike the more aggressive and personal writings of younger critics like Truffaut and Godard, Rohmer favored a rhetorical style that made extensive use of questions and rarely used the first person singular. Rohmer was known as more politically conservative than most of the Cahiers staff, and his opinions were highly influential on the magazine's direction while he was editor. Rohmer first published articles under his real name but began using "Éric Rohmer" in 1955 so that his family would not find out that he was involved in the film world, as they would have disapproved.

Rohmer's best-known article was "Le Celluloïd et le marbre" ("Celluloid and Marble", 1955), which examines the relationship between film and other arts. In the article, Rohmer writes that in an age of cultural self-consciousness, film is "the last refuge of poetry" and the only contemporary art form from which metaphor can still spring naturally and spontaneously. In 1957, Rohmer and Chabrol wrote Hitchcock (Paris: Éditions Universitaires, 1957), the earliest book-length study of Alfred Hitchcock. It focuses on Hitchcock's Catholic background and has been called "one of the most influential film books since the Second World War, casting new light on a filmmaker hitherto considered a mere entertainer". Hitchcock helped establish the auteur theory as a critical method and contributed to the reevaluation of the American cinema that was central to that method. By 1963, Rohmer was becoming more at odds with some of the more radical left-wing critics at Cahiers du Cinéma. He continued to admire American films while many of the other left-wing critics had rejected them and were championing cinéma vérité and Marxist film criticism. Rohmer resigned that year and was succeeded by Rivette. An anthology of Rohmer's writings on cinema was published in French in 1984 and in English translation in 1989 as The Taste for Beauty.

== Film career ==
=== 1950–1962: Shorts and early film career ===
In 1950 Rohmer made his first 16mm short film, Journal d'un scélérat. The film starred writer Paul Gégauff and was made with a borrowed camera. By 1951 Rohmer had a bigger budget provided by friends and shot the short film Présentation ou Charlotte et son steak. The 12-minute film was co-written by and starred Jean-Luc Godard. The film was not completed until 1961. In 1952 Rohmer began collaborating with Pierre Guilbaud on a one-hour short feature, Les Petites Filles modèles, but the film was never finished. In 1954 Rohmer made and acted in Bérénice, a 15-minute short based on a story by Edgar Allan Poe. In 1956 Rohmer directed, wrote, edited and starred in La Sonate à Kreutzer, a 50-minute film produced by Godard. In 1958 Rohmer made Véronique et son cancre, a 20-minute short produced by Chabrol.

Chabrol's company AJYM produced Rohmer's feature directorial debut, The Sign of Leo (Le Signe du lion) in 1959. In the film an American composer spends the month of August waiting for his inheritance while all his friends are on vacation and gradually becomes impoverished. It included music by Louis Saguer. The Sign of Leo was later recut and rescored by distributors when Chabrol was forced to sell his production company, and Rohmer disowned the recut version. In 1962 Rohmer and Barbet Schroeder co-founded the production company Les Films du Losange (they were later joined by Pierre Coltrell in the late 1960s). Les Films du Losange produced all of Rohmer's work (except his last three features produced by La Compagnie Eric Rohmer).

=== 1962–1972: Six Moral Tales and television work ===
Rohmer's career began to gain momentum with his Six Moral Tales (Six contes moraux). Each of the films in the cycle follows the same story, inspired by F. W. Murnau's Sunrise: A Song of Two Humans (1927): a man, married or otherwise committed to a woman, is tempted by a second woman but eventually returns to the first.

For Rohmer, these stories' characters "like to bring their motives, the reasons for their actions, into the open, they try to analyze, they are not people who act without thinking about what they are doing. What matters is what they think about their behavior, rather than their behavior itself." The French word "moraliste" does not translate directly to the English "moralist" and has more to do with what someone thinks and feels. Rohmer cited the works of Blaise Pascal, Jean de La Bruyère, François de La Rochefoucauld and Stendhal as inspirations for the series. He clarified, "a moraliste is someone who is interested in the description of what goes on inside man. He's concerned with states of mind and feelings." Regarding the repetition of a single storyline, he explained that it would allow him to explore six variations of the same theme. Moreover, he said, "I was determined to be inflexible and intractable, because if you persist in an idea it seems to me that in the end you do secure a following."

The first Moral Tale was The Bakery Girl of Monceau (1963). This 26-minute film portrays a young man, a college student, who sees a young woman in the street and spends days obsessively searching for her. He meets a second woman who works in a bakery and begins to flirt with her, but abandons her when he finally finds the first woman. Schroder starred as the young man and Bertrand Tavernier was the narrator. The second Moral Tale was Suzanne's Career (1963). This 60-minute film portrays a young student who is rejected by one woman and begins a romantic relationship with a second. The first and second Moral Tales were never theatrically released and Rohmer was disappointed by their poor technical quality. They were not well known until after the release of the other four.

In 1963 Les Films du Losange produced the New Wave omnibus film Six in Paris, of which Rohmer's short "Place de l'Etoile" was the centerpiece. After being driven out of his editor position at Cahiers, Rohmer began making short documentaries for French television. Between 1964 and 1966 Rohmer made 14 shorts for television through the Office de Radiodiffusion Télévision Française (ORTF) and Télévision Scolaire. These included episodes of Filmmakers of Our Time on Louis Lumiere and Carl Theodor Dreyer, educational films on Blaise Pascal and Stéphane Mallarmé, and documentaries on the Percival legend, the Industrial Revolution and female students in Paris. Rohmer later said that television taught him how to make "readable images". He later said, "When you show a film on TV, the framing goes to pieces, straight lines are warped...the way people stand and walk and move, the whole physical dimension...all this is lost. Personally I don't feel that TV is an intimate medium." In 1964 Rohmer made the 13-minute short film Nadja à Paris with cinematographer Nestor Almendros.

Rohmer and Schroder then sold the rights of two of their short films to French television in order to raise $60,000 to produce the feature film La Collectionneuse in 1967, the third Moral Tale. The film's budget went only to film stock and renting a house in St. Tropez as a set. Rohmer described it as a film about l'amour par désoeuvrement ("love from idleness"). La Collectionneuse won the Jury Grand Prix at the 17th Berlin International Film Festival and was praised by French film critics, though US film critics called it "boring".

The fourth Moral Tale was My Night at Maud's in 1969. The film was made with funds raised by Truffaut, who liked the script, and was initially intended to be the third Moral Tale. But because the film takes place on Christmas Eve, Rohmer wanted to shoot the film in December. Actor Jean-Louis Trintignant was not available so filming was delayed for a year. The film centers on Pascal's Wager and stars Trintignant, Françoise Fabian, Marie-Christine Barrault and Antoine Vitez. My Night at Maud's was Rohmer's first successful film both commercially and critically. It was screened and highly praised at the 1969 Cannes Film Festival and later won the Prix Max Ophüls. It was released in the US and praised by critics there as well. It eventually received Oscar nominations for Best Original Screenplay and Best Foreign Film. James Monaco wrote, "Here, for the first time the focus is clearly set on the ethical and existential question of choice. If it isn't clear within Maud who actually is making the wager and whether or not they win or lose, that only enlarges the idea of le pari ("the bet") into the encompassing metaphor that Rohmer wants for the entire series."

The fifth Moral Tale was Le genou de Claire (Claire's Knee, 1970). It won the Grand Prix at the San Sebastián International Film Festival, the Prix Louis Delluc and the Prix Méliès, and was a huge international success. Vincent Canby called it "something close to a perfect film." It was Rohmer's second film in color. Rohmer said, "the presence of the lake and the mountains is stronger in color than in black and white. It is a film I couldn't imagine in black and white. The color green seems to me essential in that film...This film would have no value to me in black and white."

The sixth and final Moral Tale was 1972's Love in the Afternoon (released as Chloe in the Afternoon in the US). Molly Haskell criticized the film for betraying the rest of the series by making a moral judgment of the main character and approving of his decision in the film.

Overall, Rohmer said he wanted the Six Moral Tales "to portray in film what seemed most alien to the medium, to express feelings buried deep in our consciousness. That's why they have to be narrated in the first person singular...The protagonist discusses himself and judges his actions. I film the process."

=== 1972–1987: Adaptations and Comedies and Proverbs ===
In 1974, Rohmer completed a doctoral thesis on Murnau at the Université Paris I under the supervision of Étienne Souriau.

After the Moral Tales, Rohmer wanted to make a less personal film and adapted Heinrich von Kleist's novella The Marquise of O as La Marquise d'O... in 1976. It was one of Rohmer's most critically acclaimed films, with many critics ranking it with My Night at Maud's and Claire's Knee. Rohmer said: "It wasn't simply the action I was drawn to, but the text itself. I didn't want to translate it into images, or make a filmed equivalent. I wanted to use the text as if Kleist himself had put it directly on the screen, as if he were making a movie ... Kleist didn't copy me and I didn't copy him, but obviously there was an affinity."

In 1978 Rohmer made the Holy Grail legend film Perceval le Gallois, based on a 12th-century manuscript by Chrétien de Troyes. The film received mostly poor reviews. Tom Milne said the film was "almost universally greeted as a disappointment, at best a whimsical exercise in the faux-naif in its attempt to capture the poetic simplicity of medieval faith, at worse an anticlimatic blunder" and that it was "rather like watching the animation of a medieval manuscript, with the text gravely read aloud while the images—cramped and crowded, coloured with jewelled brilliance, delighting the eye with bizarre perspectives—magnificently play the role traditionally assigned to marginal illuminations." In 1980 Rohmer made a film for television of his stage production of Kleist's play Catherine de Heilbronn, another work with a medieval setting.

Later in 1980 Rohmer embarked on a second series of films: the "Comedies and Proverbs" (Comédies et Proverbes), with each film based on a proverb. The first of these is The Aviator's Wife, which is based on an idea Rohmer had had since the mid-1940s. This was followed in 1981 by Le Beau Mariage (A Perfect Marriage). Rohmer said: "what interests me is to show how someone's imagination works. The fact that obsession can replace reality." Film critic Claude Baignères wrote, "Eric Rohmer is a virtuoso of the pen sketch...[He had not been] at ease with the paint tubes that Persival required, [but in this film he created] a tiny figurine whose every feature, every curl, every tone is aimed at revealing to us a state of soul and of heart." Raphael Bassan wrote, "the filmmaker fails to achieve in these dialogues the flexibility, the textual freedom of The Aviator's Wife. A Perfect Marriage is only a variation on the spiritual states of the petty bourgeoisie who go on and on forever about the legitimacy of certain institutions or beliefs confronted by problems of the emotions. Quite simply, this is a minor variation on this central Rohmerian theme."

The third "Comedy and proverb" is Pauline at the Beach (1983). It won the Silver Bear for Best Director at the 33rd Berlin International Film Festival. It is based on an idea Rohmer had in the 1950s, originally intended for Brigitte Bardot. Rohmer often made films he had been working on for many years. He said: "I can't say 'I make one film, then after that film I look for a subject and write on that subject...then I shoot.' Not at all...these are films that are drawn from one evolving mass, films that have been in my head for a long time and that I think about simultaneously."

The fourth "Comedy and Proverb" is Full Moon in Paris (1984). The film's proverb was invented by Rohmer himself: "The one who has two wives loses his soul, the one who has two houses loses his mind." Its cinematographer, Renato Berta, called it "one of the most luxurious films ever made" because of the large amount of preparation put into it. The film began with Rohmer and the actors discussing their roles and reading from the film's scenario while tape-recording the rehearsals. Rohmer then rewrote the script based on these sessions and shot the film on Super 8mm as a dress rehearsal. When the film was finally shot, Rohmer often did three or fewer takes of a scene. Alain Bergala and Alain Philippon said that "all the art of Eric Rohmer consists of creating on the set a veritable osmosis among himself, the actors and the technicians." Rohmer even encouraged actress Pascale Ogier to design sets for the film since her character is an interior decorator. Ogier later won the Best Actress award at the Venice Film Festival. Philippon called the film "one of the most accomplished films that Rohmer has given us...and that if the film moves it is because of its own risk-taking."

The fifth "Comedy and Proverb" is The Green Ray (1986). Rohmer said: "I was struck by the naturalness of television interviews. You can say that here, nature is perfect. If you look for it, you find it because people forget the cameras." As was becoming his custom in pre-production, Rohmer gathered his cast together to discuss the project and their characters but then allowed each actor to invent their own dialogue. Rohmer said lead actress Marie Rivière "is the one who called the shots, not only by what she said, but by the way she'd speak, the way she'd question people, and also by the questions her character evoked from the others." The film was shot chronologically and in 16mm so as to be "as inconspicuous as possible, to have Delphine blend into the crowd as a way, ultimately, of accentuating her isolation." Rohmer also instructed his cinematographer, Sophie Maintigneux, to keep technical aspects of the shoot to a minimum so as to not interrupt or distract the actors. The film's only major expense was a trip to the Canary Islands to film the green rays there. Rohmer chose to première the film on Canal Plus TV, a pay-TV station that paid $130,000 for the film, one fifth of its budget. Rohmer said: "Cinema here will survive only because of television. Without such an alliance we won't be able to afford French films." The experiment paid off when the film was a theatrical hit after being released three days after its initial broadcast. It won the Golden Lion and the FIPRESCI Prize at the 1986 Venice Film Festival. Critics mostly praised it, though Alain Robbe-Grillet wrote an unfavorable review.

The Sixth "Comedy and Proverb" is Boyfriends and Girlfriends (L'Ami de mon amie, 1987).

=== 1987–2009: Tales of the Four Seasons and later film career ===
Rohmer filmed a third series in the 1990s: Tales of the Four Seasons (Contes des quatre saisons), comprising A Tale of Springtime (1990), A Tale of Winter (1992), A Summer's Tale (1996) and Autumn Tale (1999), released when Rohmer was 79. In this series, Rohmer no longer seeks to illustrate moral lessons or rationalise his protagonists' choices, as he had in his earlier series. Rather, he examines how different people respond when chance encounters and discoveries alter their plans and undermine their independence. Even though the protagonists are different from each other, all are shown over a one- to two-week period grappling with uncertainty and change. That seasons themselves are impermanent highlights the films' themes.

In the 2000s, Rohmer returned to period drama with The Lady and the Duke and Triple Agent. The Lady and the Duke caused considerable controversy in France, where its negative portrayal of the French Revolution led some critics to call it monarchist propaganda. It was well received elsewhere for its innovative cinematic style and strong performances.

In 2001, Rohmer's life's work was recognised when he received the Golden Lion at the Venice Film Festival.

In 2007, Rohmer's final film, The Romance of Astrea and Celadon, screened at the Venice Film Festival, where he spoke of retiring.

== Style ==
Rohmer's films concentrate on intelligent, articulate protagonists who frequently fail to own up to their desires. The contrast between what they say and what they do fuels much of the drama. Gerard Legrand said, "he is one of the rare filmmakers who is constantly inviting you to be intelligent, indeed, more intelligent than his (likable) characters." Rohmer considered filmmaking "closer to the novel—to a certain classical style of novel which the cinema is now taking over—than the other forms of entertainment, like the theater."

Many of Rohmer's films have a circular structure, with the main part consisting of a digression that will "seem to promise escape from a trap which the protagonist feels closing around him or her, but will come to be seen rather as itself a trap from which the protagonist must escape". This is most easily observable in films such as Pauline at the Beach and A Summer's Tale, which begin with their protagonists arriving and end with their protagonists leaving in the same manner in which they arrived.

Rohmer saw the full-face closeup as a device that does not reflect how we see each other and avoided it. He avoided non-diegetic music (music not from in-story sound sources), seeing it as breaking the fourth wall, but inserted occasional soundtrack music in The Green Ray. Rohmer also tended to spend considerable time in his films showing his characters going from place to place, walking, driving, bicycling or commuting on a train, conveying that mundane travel is part of the most people's days. This is most evident in Le Beau Mariage (1982), in which the protagonist constantly travels, particularly between Paris and Le Mans.

Rohmer typically populates his films with people in their twenties and the settings are often on pleasant beaches and popular resorts, notably in La collectionneuse, Pauline at the Beach, The Green Ray, and A Summer's Tale. These films are immersed in bright sunlight, blue skies, green grass, sandy beaches, and clear water. He said: "people sometimes ask me why most of the main characters in my films are young. I don't feel at ease with older people ... I can't get people older than forty to talk convincingly."

Half a dozen of Rohmer's films are set in the summertime, which he depicts as a time of beauty, leisure, and "stagnation and aimlessness". He does this through cinematography and sound design, but primarily by presenting "reflective characters with too much time on their hands and too many thoughts in their heads". Rohmer said he wanted to look at "thoughts rather than actions", dealing "less with what people do than what is going on in their minds while they are doing it." Given his professed interest in the anticipation rather than the climax in his tales, summer gives his characters the time and space to show their self-consciousness and anxiety, rather than the solitude and relaxation they desire.

Rohmer preferred to use nonprofessional actors. He usually held many rehearsals before shooting and shot his films very quickly. He spent little time editing. He usually shot his films chronologically, and often shot scenes at the time of day at which they take place. He said: "my films are based on meteorology. If I didn't call the weather service everyday, I couldn't make my films because they're shot according to the weather outside. My films are slaves to weather."

Similarly, Rohmer's films all have a strong sense of place. They clearly depict their settings and how the characters fit into them. Characters travel or walk past signposts or monuments, or converse about these places. The locations are as important an element as what his characters say and do. Rohmer has been called a "poet of place".

Rohmer's characters engage in long conversations—mostly about man–woman relationships but also mundane issues like trying to find a vacation spot. Characters also occasionally digress on literature and philosophy; most of them are middle-class and well-educated.

A Summer's Tale has most of the elements of a typical Rohmer film: no soundtrack music, no closeups, a seaside resort, long conversations between beautiful, young, middle-class, educated people, and discussions of the characters' interests. Melvil Poupaud, who plays the protagonist, said that no other filmmaker could write dialogue like that and make it ring true.

Beginning in the late 1970s, during the production of Perceval le Gallois, Rohmer began to reduce the number of crew members on his films. He first dispensed with the script supervisor, then (controversially) cut out the assistant director, then all other assistants and technical managers until, by the time he shot The Green Ray in 1986, his crew consisted only of a camera operator and a sound engineer. On the set of A Summer's Tale, he even made the sandwiches himself. Rohmer said, "I even wonder if I could work in the usual conditions of filmmaking."

In the 1975 film Night Moves, Gene Hackman's character says watching Rohmer's films is "kind of like watching paint dry".

Rohmer was a highly literary man. His films frequently refer to ideas and themes in plays and novels, such as references to Jules Verne (in The Green Ray), William Shakespeare (in A Winter's Tale) and Pascal's wager (in Ma nuit chez Maud).

== Personal life and death ==
Rohmer's brother was the philosopher René Schérer. In 1957, Rohmer married Thérèse Barbet. The couple had two sons. The elder, René Monzat (b. 1958), is an author and investigative journalist at, most recently, Le Monde and Mediapart. His work focuses on critiquing the French far-right.

Rohmer was a devout Catholic, monarchist, and "ecological zealot". For years he had no telephone and refused to get into cars, which he called "immoral pollutors". For many years he was known to jog two miles to his office every morning. He was well known for his need for personal privacy and sometimes wore disguises, such as a false moustache at the New York premiere of one of his films. Rohmer's mother died without ever knowing that her son was a famous film director.

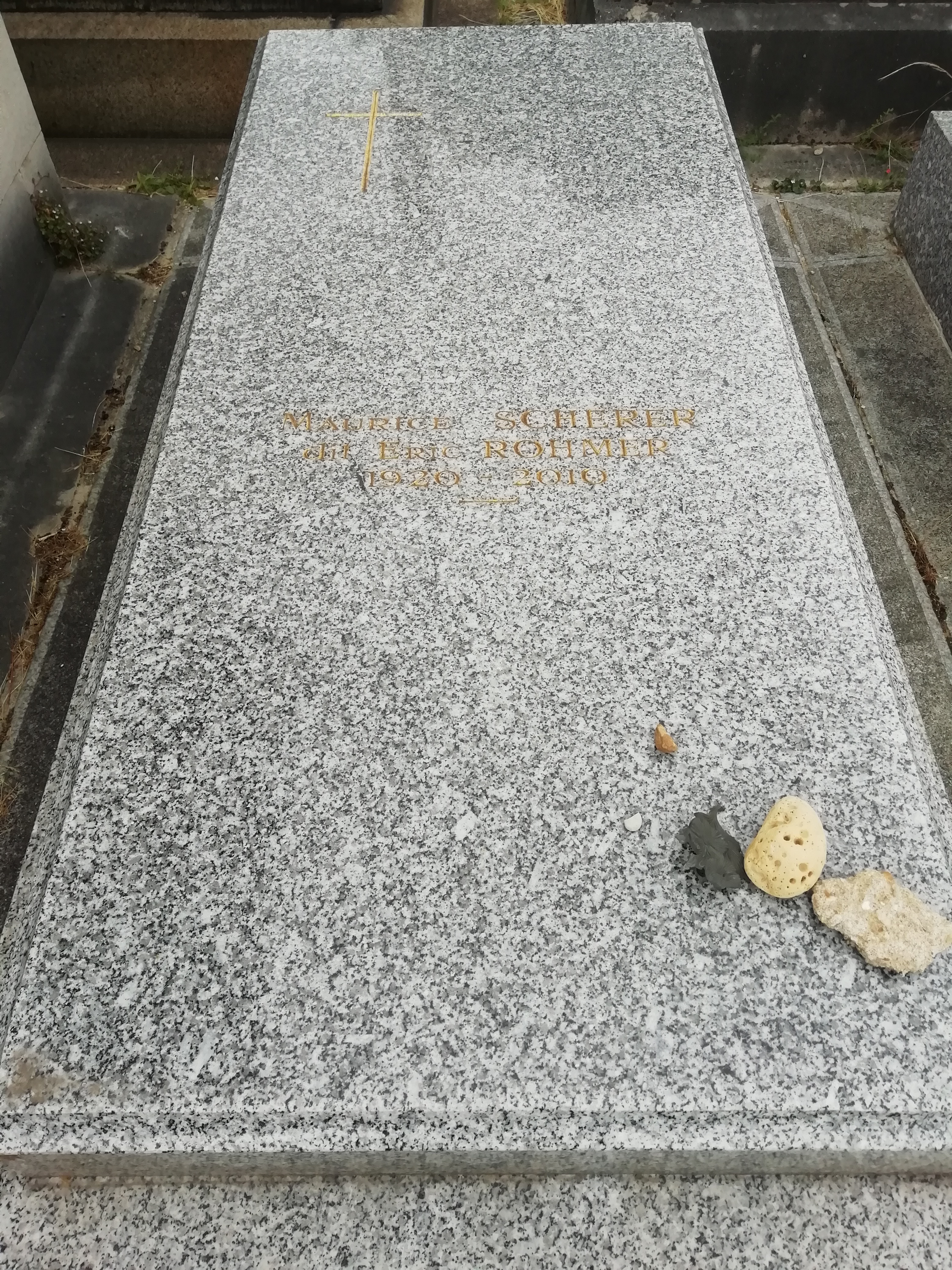
Rohmer's grave in Montparnasse Cemetery

Rohmer died on the morning of 11 January 2010 at the age of 89 after a series of strokes. He had been admitted to hospital the previous week.

The former Culture Minister Jack Lang called Rohmer "one of the masters of French cinema". Director Thierry Fremaux called his work "unique".

Rohmer's grave is in district 13 of Montparnasse Cemetery.

At the 2010 César Awards, actor Fabrice Luchini presented a special tribute to Rohmer:

I'm going to read a remarkable text written by Jacques Fieschi, writer, director, creator of "the cinematographe", challenger of Les cahiers du cinéma, which recently published a special edition on Eric Rohmer. Truffaut once said he was one of the greatest directors of the 20th century, Godard was his brother, Chabrol admired him, Wenders couldn't stop taking photos of him. Rohmer is a tremendous international star. The one and only French director who was in coherence with the money spent on his films and the money that his films made. I remember a phrase by Daniel Toscan Du Plantier the day Les Visiteurs opened, which eventually sold 15 million tickets: "Yes but there is this incredible film called L'arbre, le maire et la médiathèque that sold 100,000 tickets, which may sound ridiculous in comparison, but no, because but it was only playing in one theater for an entire year." A happy time for cinema when this kind of thing could happen. Rohmer. Here is a tribute from Jacques Fieschi: "We are all connected with the cinema, at least for a short time. The cinema has its economical laws, its artistic laws, a craft that once in a while rewards us or forgets us. Éric Rohmer seems to have escaped from this reality by inventing his own laws, his own rules of the game. One could say his own economy of the cinema that served his own purpose, which could skip the others, or to be more accurate that couldn't skip the audience with its originality. He had a very unique point of view on the different levels of language and on desire that is at work in the heart of each and every human being, on youth, on seasons, on literature, of course, and one could say on history. Éric Rohmer, this sensual intellectual, with his silhouette of a teacher and a walker. As an outsider he made luminous and candid films in which he deliberately forgot his perfect knowledge of the cinema in a very direct link with the beauty of the world." The text was by Jacques Fieschi and it was a tribute to Éric Rohmer. Thank you.

On 8 February 2010, the Cinémathèque Française held a special tribute to Rohmer that included a screening of Claire's Knee and a short video tribute to Rohmer by Jean-Luc Godard.

== Legacy ==
Rohmer's depictions of Paris are the subject of Richard Misek's 2013 documentary Rohmer in Paris.

Éric Rohmer: A Biography, by Antoine de Baecque and Noël Herpe, was published in French in 2014 and English translation in 2016.

Marco Grosoli's 2018 book Eric Rohmer's Film Theory (1948–1953) analyzes and reevaluates Rohmer's early writings on cinema.

== Awards and nominations ==
Year	Award	Category	Nominated work	Result
1967	Berlin International Film Festival	Golden Bear	La Collectionneuse	Nominated
1967	Berlin International Film Festival	Silver Bear Extraordinary Jury Prize	La Collectionneuse	Won
1967	Berlin International Film Festival	Best Feature Film Suitable for Young People	La Collectionneuse	Won
1969	Cannes Film Festival	Palme d'Or	My Night at Maud's	Nominated
1970	Academy Awards	Best Foreign Language Film	My Night at Maud's	Nominated
1970	French Syndicate of Cinema Critics	Prix Méliès	My Night at Maud's	Won
1970	National Society of Film Critics	Best Screenplay	My Night at Maud's	Won
1970	Sant Jordi Awards	Best Foreign Film	My Night at Maud's	Won
1971	Academy Awards	Best Story and Screenplay Based on Factual Material or Material Not Previously Published or Produced	My Night at Maud's	Nominated
1971	New York Film Critics Circle Award	Best Screenplay	My Night at Maud's	Won
1971	Louis Delluc Prize		Claire's Knee	Won
1971	National Society of Film Critics Awards	Best Film	Claire's Knee	Won
1971	National Society of Film Critics Awards	Best Director	Claire's Knee	Nominated
1971	National Society of Film Critics Awards	Best Screenplay	Claire's Knee	Nominated
1971	San Sebastián International Film Festival	Golden Shell	Claire's Knee	Won
1972	Golden Globe Awards	Best Foreign Film (Foreign Language)	Claire's Knee	Nominated
1972	French Syndicate of Cinema Critics	Prix Méliès	Claire's Knee	Won
1972	New York Film Critics Circle Awards	Best Screenplay	Claire's Knee	Runner-up
1976	Cannes Film Festival	Palme d'Or	The Marquise of O	Nominated
1976	Cannes Film Festival	Grand Prix	The Marquise of O	Won (Note: Tied with Carlos Saura for Cría Cuervos)
1977	National Society of Film Critics Award	Best Director	The Marquise of O	Nominated
1979	Valladolid International Film Festival	Golden Spike	Perceval le Gallois	Nominated
1979	Valladolid International Film Festival	Honorable Mention	Perceval le Gallois	Won
1980	French Syndicate of Cinema Critics	Prix Méliès	Perceval le Gallois	Won
1983	César Awards	Best Original Screenplay	Le Beau Mariage	Nominated
1983	Berlin International Film Festival	Golden Bear	Pauline at the Beach	Nominated
1983	Berlin International Film Festival	Silver Bear for Best Director	Pauline at the Beach	Won
1983	Berlin International Film Festival	FIPRESCI Prize	Pauline at the Beach	Won (Note: Tied with Erden Kıral for A Season in Hakkari)
1983	Berlin International Film Festival	OCIC Award – Honorable Mention	Pauline at the Beach	Won
1984	Boston Society of Film Critics Award	Best Screenplay	Pauline at the Beach	Won
1984	French Syndicate of Cinema Critics	Prix Méliès	Pauline at the Beach	Won
1985	César Awards	Best Film	Full Moon in Paris	Nominated
1985	César Awards	Best Director	Full Moon in Paris	Nominated
1985	César Awards	Best Original Screenplay	Full Moon in Paris	Nominated
1985	French Syndicate of Cinema Critics	Prix Méliès	Full Moon in Paris	Won
1986	Venice Film Festival	Golden Lion	The Green Ray	Won
1986	Venice Film Festival	FIPRESCI Prize	The Green Ray	Won
1986	Venice Film Festival	Golden Ciak	The Green Ray	Won
1988	César Awards	Best Original Screenplay or Adaptation	Boyfriends and Girlfriends	Nominated
1990	David di Donatello	Luchino Visconti Award	None	Won
1992	Berlin International Film Festival	Golden Bear	A Tale of Winter	Nominated
1992	Berlin International Film Festival	FIPRESCI Prize	A Tale of Winter	Won
1992	Berlin International Film Festival	Prize of the Ecumenical Jury – Special Mention	A Tale of Winter	Won
1995	Chicago International Film Festival	Best Feature	Rendezvous in Paris	Nominated
1998	Venice Film Festival	Golden Lion	Autumn Tale	Nominated
1998	Venice Film Festival	Golden Osella for Best Original Screenplay	Autumn Tale	Won
1998	Venice Film Festival	Sergio Trasatti Award – Special Mention	Autumn Tale	Won
1999	National Society of Film Critics	Best Foreign Language Film	Autumn Tale	Won
2000	Chicago Film Critics Association Awards	Best Foreign Language Film	Autumn Tale	Nominated
2001	European Film Awards	Best Director	The Lady and the Duke	Nominated
2001	Venice Film Festival	Career Golden Lion	None	Won
2004	Berlin International Film Festival	Golden Bear	Triple Agent	Nominated
2007	Louis Delluc Prize		The Romance of Astrea and Celadon	Nominated
2007	Venice Film Festival	Golden Lion	The Romance of Astrea and Celadon	Nominated
2007	Venice Film Festival	Queer Lion	The Romance of Astrea and Celadon	Nominated

== Filmography ==
Directed features

- The Sign of Leo (1962)
- The Collector (1967)
- My Night at Maud's (1969)
- Claire's Knee (1970)
- Love in the Afternoon (1972)
- The Marquise of O (1976)
- Perceval le Gallois (1978)
- Catherine de Heilbronn (1980, television film)
- The Aviator's Wife (1981)
- A Good Marriage (1982)
- Pauline at the Beach (1983)
- Full Moon in Paris (1984)
- The Green Ray (1986)
- Boyfriends and Girlfriends (1987)
- Four Adventures of Reinette and Mirabelle (1987)
- Le trio en mi bémol (1988)
- A Tale of Springtime (1990)
- A Tale of Winter (1992)
- The Tree, the Mayor and the Mediatheque (1993)
- Rendezvous in Paris (1995)
- A Summer's Tale (1996)
- Autumn Tale (1998)
- The Lady and the Duke (2001)
- Triple Agent (2004)
- The Romance of Astrea and Celadon (2007)

== Bibliography ==
- Élisabeth (1947; published in English in 2026)
- Hitchcock (1957, with Claude Chabrol; published in English as Hitchcock: the First Forty-four Films in 1979)
- Six Contes Moraux (1975; published in English as Six Moral Tales in 1980)
- L' Organisation de l'Espace dans le Faust de Murnau (1977)
- Goût de la beauté (1984; published in English as The Taste of Beauty in 1990)

== Bibliography ==
- Baecque, Antoine de and Herpe, Noël. Éric Rohmer. Stock. 2014. ISBN 978-2234075610.
- Montero, José Francisco & Paredes, Israel. Imágenes de la Revolución. La inglesa y el duque/La commune (París, 1871). 2011. Shangrila Ediciones. https://web.archive.org/web/20140421082451/http://shangrilaedicionesblog.blogspot.com/2011/10/imagenes-de-la-revolucion-intertextos.html
- Eric Rohmer: Realist and Moralist (Midland: 22 June 1988) ISBN 978-0253204738

Media offices
Preceded by André Bazin	Editor of Cahiers du cinéma 1958–1963	Succeeded by Jacques Rivette
