= Éric Rohmer filmography =

This is a list of films by the French director Éric Rohmer.

== Filmography ==
=== Contes moraux (Six Moral Tales) ===
- 1963 #1 La Boulangère de Monceau (The Bakery Girl of Monceau) — short, not released theatrically
- 1963 #2 La Carrière de Suzanne (Suzanne's Career) — short, not released theatrically
- 1967 #4 in production order, #3 in release order La Collectionneuse (The Female Collector)
- 1969 #3 in production order, #4 in release order Ma nuit chez Maud (My Night at Maud's/My Night with Maud) — although planned as the third moral tale, its production was delayed due to the unavailability of actor Jean-Louis Trintignant. It was released after the fourth tale.
- 1970 #5 Le Genou de Claire (Claire's Knee)
- 1972 #6 L'Amour l'après-midi (Love in the Afternoon/Chloe in the Afternoon)

=== Comédies et Proverbes (Comedies and Proverbs) ===
- 1981 La Femme de l'aviateur (The Aviator's Wife) — "It is impossible to think about nothing."
- 1982 Le Beau mariage (A Good Marriage) — "Can anyone refrain from building castles in Spain?"
- 1983 Pauline à la plage (Pauline at the Beach) — "He who talks too much will hurt himself."
- 1984 Les nuits de la pleine lune (Full Moon in Paris) — "He who has two women loses his soul, he who has two houses loses his mind."
- 1986 Le Rayon vert (The Green Ray [UK] / Summer [North America]) — "Ah, for the days/that set our hearts ablaze,"
- 1987 L'Ami de mon amie (My Girlfriend's Boyfriend/Boyfriends and Girlfriends) — "My friends' friends are my friends."

=== Contes des quatre saisons (Tales of the Four Seasons) ===
- 1990 Conte de printemps (A Tale of Springtime)
- 1992 Conte d'hiver (A Winter's Tale/A Tale of Winter)
- 1996 Conte d'été (A Tale of Summer)
- 1998 Conte d'automne (A Tale of Autumn)

=== Other feature films ===
- 1962 Le Signe du lion
- 1976 La Marquise d'O... (The Marquise of O...)
- 1978 Perceval le Gallois
- 1980 Catherine de Heilbronn (TV film)
- 1987 Le trio en si bémol
- 1987 Quatre Aventures de Reinette et Mirabelle (Four Adventures of Reinette and Mirabelle)
- 1993 L'Arbre, le maire et la médiathèque (The Tree, The Mayor, and the Mediatheque)
- 1995 Les Rendez-vous de Paris (Rendezvous in Paris)
- 2000 L'Anglaise et le duc (The Lady and the Duke)
- 2004 Triple Agent
- 2007 Les Amours d'Astrée et de Céladon

=== Workshop Collection: Anniversaries ===
- 1993 L'Anniversaire de Paula directed by Haydée Caillot with Eric Rohmer's help
- 1996 France directed by Diane Baratier with Eric Rohmer's help
- 1997 Des Goûts et des couleurs directed by Anne-Sophie Rouvillois with Eric Rohmer's help
- 1997 Les Amis de Ninon directed by Françoise Quéré with Eric Rohmer's help
- 1998 Heurts divers directed by Florence Rauscher and François Rauscher with Eric Rohmer's help

=== Workshop Collection: Le Modèle ===
- 1998 Un dentiste exemplaire directed by Aurélia Alcais and Haydée Caillot with Eric Rohmer's help
- 1999 Une histoire qui se dessine directed by Françoise Quéré with Eric Rohmer's help
- 1999 La Cambrure directed by Edwige Shaki with Eric Rohmer's help
- 2005 Le Canapé rouge directed by Marie Rivière with Eric Rohmer's help
- 2008 Le Nu à la terrasse directed by Annie Balkarash with Eric Rohmer's help
- 2009 La Proposition directed by Anne-Sophie Rouvillois with Eric Rohmer's help

=== Other short films ===
- 1950 Journal d'un scélérat
- 1951 Présentation ou Charlotte et son steak
- 1952 Les Petites filles modèles (unfinished)
- 1954 Bérénice
- 1956 La Sonate à Kreutzer
- 1958 Véronique et son cancre
- 1964 Nadja à Paris
- 1965 "Place de l'Étoile" from Paris vu par... (Six in Paris)
- 1966 Une Étudiante d'aujourd'hui
- 1967 Fermière à Montfaucon
- 1983 Loup y es-tu? (Wolf, Are You There?)
- 1986 Bois ton café (Drink your coffee it's getting cold!) (music video)

=== Works for television ===
Episodes for En profil dans le texte

- 1963 Paysages urbains
- 1964 Les cabinets de physique, la vie de société au XVIIIe siècle
- 1964 Les métamorphoses du paysage, l'ère industrielle
- 1964 Les salons de Diderot
- 1964 Perceval ou le conte du Graal
- 1965 Don Quichotte de Cervantes
- 1965 Les histoires extraordinaires d'Edgar Poe
- 1965 Les caractères de La Bruyère
- 1965 Entretien sur Pascal, a debate between Dominique Dubarle and Brice Parain
- 1966 Victor Hugo, les contemplations
- 1968 Entretien avec Mallarmé
- 1968 Nancy au XVIIIe siècle
- 1969 Victor Hugo architecte
- 1969 La sorcière de Michelet
- 1969 Le béton dans la ville
- 1970 Le français langue vivante?

Episodes for Cinéastes de notre temps

- 1965 Carl Th. Dreyer
- 1966 Le celluloïd et le marbre

Episodes for Aller au cinéma

- 1968 Post-face à l'Atalante
- 1968 Louis Lumière / conversation avec Langlois et Renoir
- 1968 Post-face à Boudu sauvé des eaux

Ville nouvelle (1975, four-part miniseries)

- Épisode 1: L'enfance d'une ville
- Épisode 2: La diversité du paysage urbain
- Épisode 3: La forme de la ville
- Épisode 4: Le logement à la demande

Episode for Histoire de la vie privée

- 1989 Les Jeux de société

non-series

- 1967 L'homme et la machine
- 1967 L'homme et les images
- 1967 L'Homme et son journal
- 1968 L'homme et les frontières
- 1968 L'homme et les gouvernements
