= List of French films of 2004 =

A list of films produced in France in 2004.

Title	Director	Cast	Genre	Notes
5x2	François Ozon	Valeria Bruni Tedeschi	Drama	Nominated for Golden Lion & 1 win
Les 11 commandements	François Desagnat; Thomas Sorriaux	Michaël Youn, Vincent Desagnat, Benjamin Morgaine	Comedy	
À tout de suite	Benoît Jacquot	Isild Le Besco	Drama	1 win (best art direction) Gijón International Film Festival
Anatomy of Hell	Catherine Breillat	Amira Casar, Rocco Siffredi	Drama	
Banlieue 13	Pierre Morel	Cyril Raffaelli, David Belle	Action	
Clean	Olivier Assayas	Maggie Cheung, Nick Nolte	Drama	2 wins (Cannes) & 3 nominations
The Chorus	Christophe Barratier	Gérard Jugnot, François Berléand	Comedy drama	Nominated for 2 Oscars, +9 wins, +18 nom.
Exils	Tony Gatlif	Romain Duris, Lubna Azabal		Won the Best Director Award at Cannes
Le Grand Voyage	Ismaël Ferroukhi	Nicolas Cazalé	Drama	4 wins, +3 nominations
I Am the Ripper	Eric Anderson	Nicholas Tray	Horror	
Immortal (2004 film)	Enki Bilal	Linda Hardy, Thomas Kretschmann, Charlotte Rampling	Drama	
Innocence	Lucile Hadžihalilović	Marion Cotillard, Zoe Auclair, Lea Bridarolli	Mystery drama	Co-production with Belgium, Japan and U.K.
L'Intrus	Claire Denis	Michel Subor, Béatrice Dalle	Drama	2 nominations
Kings and Queen	Arnaud Desplechin	Mathieu Amalric, Emmanuelle Devos	Drama/Comedy	4 win & 4 nominations
Lightweight	Jean-Pierre Améris	Nicolas Duvauchelle		Screened at the 2004 Cannes Film Festival
Lila Says	Ziad Doueiri	Vahina Giocante, Moa Khouas, Karim Ben Haddou	Drama	
Look at Me	Agnès Jaoui	Agnès Jaoui, Jean-Pierre Bacri	Drama	Nominated for Palme d'Or, +5 wins, +4 nom.
Nelly	Laure Duthilleul	Sophie Marceau	Drama	Screened at the 2004 Cannes Film Festival
Notre musique	Jean-Luc Godard	Sarah Adler	Drama	1 win & 3 nominations
Souli	Alexander Abela	Eduardo Noriega	Drama	
Strange Crime	Roberto Andò	Daniel Auteuil, Anna Mouglalis, Greta Scacchi	mystery-drama	
Stupid Boy (Garçon stupide)	Lionel Baier	Pierre Chatagny	Comedy drama	1 nomination
Triple Agent	Éric Rohmer	Katerina Didaskalou, Serge Renko	Drama / Thriller	1 nomination
Two Brothers	Jean-Jacques Annaud	Guy Pearce, Jean-Claude Dreyfus, Freddie Highmore, Oanh Nguyen, Philippine Leroy-Beaulieu	Adventure drama	French-British co-production
A Very Long Engagement	Jean-Pierre Jeunet	Audrey Tautou, Gaspard Ulliel, Marion Cotillard	Romantic Drama	5 César Awards, 2 Academy Award nominations
