= Love in the Afternoon (1972 film) =

1972 film by Éric Rohmer

- Theatrical release poster
- French: L'Amour, l'après-midi
- Directed by: Éric Rohmer
- Written by: Éric Rohmer
- Produced by: Barbet Schroeder; Pierre Cottrell
- Starring: Zouzou; Bernard Verley; Françoise Verley
- Cinematography: Néstor Almendros
- Edited by: Cécile Decugis
- Music by: Arié Dzierlatka
- Production company: Les Films du Losange
- Distributed by: Warner-Columbia Film
- Release date: 1 September 1972 (France)
- Running time: 97 minutes
- Country: France
- Language: French
- Box office: $6.8 million

Love in the Afternoon (French: L'Amour, l'après-midi; released in North America as Chloe in the Afternoon) is a 1972 French romantic comedy-drama film written and directed by Éric Rohmer. It is the sixth and final of Rohmer's "Six Moral Tales" series.

The story revolves around a Paris businessman's contemplation of an affair around the time his wife gives birth to their second child. The film received mostly positive reviews. An English-language remake starring Chris Rock, titled I Think I Love My Wife, was released in 2007.

== Plot ==
Frédéric, a young and successful partner in a Paris business firm, is happily married to Hélène, an English teacher, with whom he has a young daughter and another child on the way. Nevertheless, as Frédéric sees beautiful women pass by him on the street throughout his day, he craves the thrill of a fresh affair. He fantasizes about possessing a magical amulet that causes women to obey his will, (Note: The sequence features actresses from previous installments in Rohmer's "Six Moral Tales" series.) but in reality, Frédéric does not act on these impulses and returns to his wife every evening.

One day, Chloé, a woman from Frédéric's past, stops by his office. Chloé had once been the girlfriend of one of Frédéric's old friends, whom she caused this a great deal of grief. At first, Chloé says that she only is looking for work, but continues to visit him to keep him company as she tries to improve her situation, often taking him out of the office—to the amusement of the secretaries in Frédéric's office. Frédéric enjoys having someone to talk to, having never really opened up to his wife in this way.

Chloé asks Frédéric to help her move out of a guy's apartment she had been staying with, leading to increased flirtation as she finds her footing in her own apartment. Frédéric hears of a job opening from one of the secretaries, leading to Chloé finding stable employment. The two greatly enjoy each other's company, but Frédéric rejects Chloé's romantic interest in him when he ponders what his wife would think. After the birth of Frédéric's infant son, he and Hélène hire a nanny. As the children get used to the nanny's presence, Frédéric teases his daughter by pulling his polo neck over his head and making a funny face.

Chloé tells Frédéric that she wishes him to father her own child whom she wishes to raise independently. Frédéric cannot see how he can grant Chloé's request, but becomes even more attracted to her. One afternoon, Frédéric meets Chloé at her apartment and finds her in the shower. At her request, he towels her dry. Frédéric begins to undress, pulling his turtleneck over his head and making a funny face at Chloé, who waits for him naked in her bed. Frédéric looks blankly at his comical appearance in the mirror. Without a word to Chloé, he sneaks out through a side door and goes home to Hélène. He tells her that he wants to be able to talk to her like he has been unable to do, prompting Hélène to break down in tears. They rekindle their sensuous feelings for one another and go to their bedroom.

== Cast ==
- Bernard Verley as Frédéric Carrelet, a married businessman
- Zouzou as Chloé, an old acquaintance of Frédéric who comes back into his life
- Françoise Verley as Hélène Carrelet, an English teacher married to Frédéric (Bernard and Françoise Verley were also married in real life)
- Daniel Ceccaldi as Gérard, Frédéric's business partner
- Malvina Penne as Fabienne, Frédéric's secretary
- Babette Ferrier as Martine, Gérard's secretary
- Tina Michelino as the woman on the train
- Jean-Louis Livi as the acquaintance who runs into Frédéric at lunch
- Pierre Nunzi as the clothing salesman
- Irène Skobline as the clothing saleswoman
- Frédérique Hender as Mrs. M., a math teacher and friend of the Carrelet's
- Claude-Jean Philippe as Mr. M., a literature teacher and friend of the Carrelet's
- Silvia Badescu as the young woman at the café
- Claude Bertrand as the young man at the café
- Sylvaine Charlet as Chloé's landlady
- Daniele Malat as the customer at the dress shop
- Suze Randall as the Carrelet's English au pair
- Françoise Fabian (from My Night at Maud's) as a woman during the dream sequence ("Indifferent")
- Marie-Christine Barrault (from My Night at Maud's) as a woman during the dream sequence ("Hesitant")
- Haydée Politoff (from La Collectionneuse) as a woman during the dream sequence ("Busy")
- Aurora Cornu (from Claire's Knee) as a woman during the dream sequence ("Alone")
- Laurence de Monaghan (from Claire's Knee) as a woman during the dream sequence ("Accompanied")
- Béatrice Romand (from Claire's Knee) as a woman during the dream sequence ("Hurried")

== Reception ==
On the review aggregator website Rotten Tomatoes, 87% of 23 critics' reviews of the film are positive; the site's "critics consensus" reads: "Eric Rohmer's Chloe in the Afternoon doesn't need sparkly cinematic dross to discover unspoken, universal truths about relationships and love through filmmaking."

Roger Ebert of the Chicago Sun-Times gave the film 4 out 4 stars, calling it the best of Rohmer's "Six Moral Tales" series, and adding:

It is also the most fully rounded, lacking the one-dimensional tone of some of his earlier tales. It's as if he were striking notes in the previous works, and is now bringing them all together into a chord; the final scene in Chloe is his last comment on the series, and Rohmer is telling us to, for god's sake, stop playing games and embrace each other with honesty.

Vincent Canby of The New York Times gave the film a positive review, writing: "because Mr. Rohmer keeps his focus short, clear and precise, one sees deeply into the lives of his characters without the sort of pretentious distortions of most movies that deal in metaphors."

In contrast, Pauline Kael wrote that the impact of the film "had evaporated a half hour after I saw it. It's about as forgettable as a movie can be."

== Legacy ==
An English-language remake starring Chris Rock, titled I Think I Love My Wife, was released in 2007.

Singer-songwriter St. Vincent named the opening song of her 2011 album, Strange Mercy, after the film.
