= Alexandra Stewart =

Canadian actress

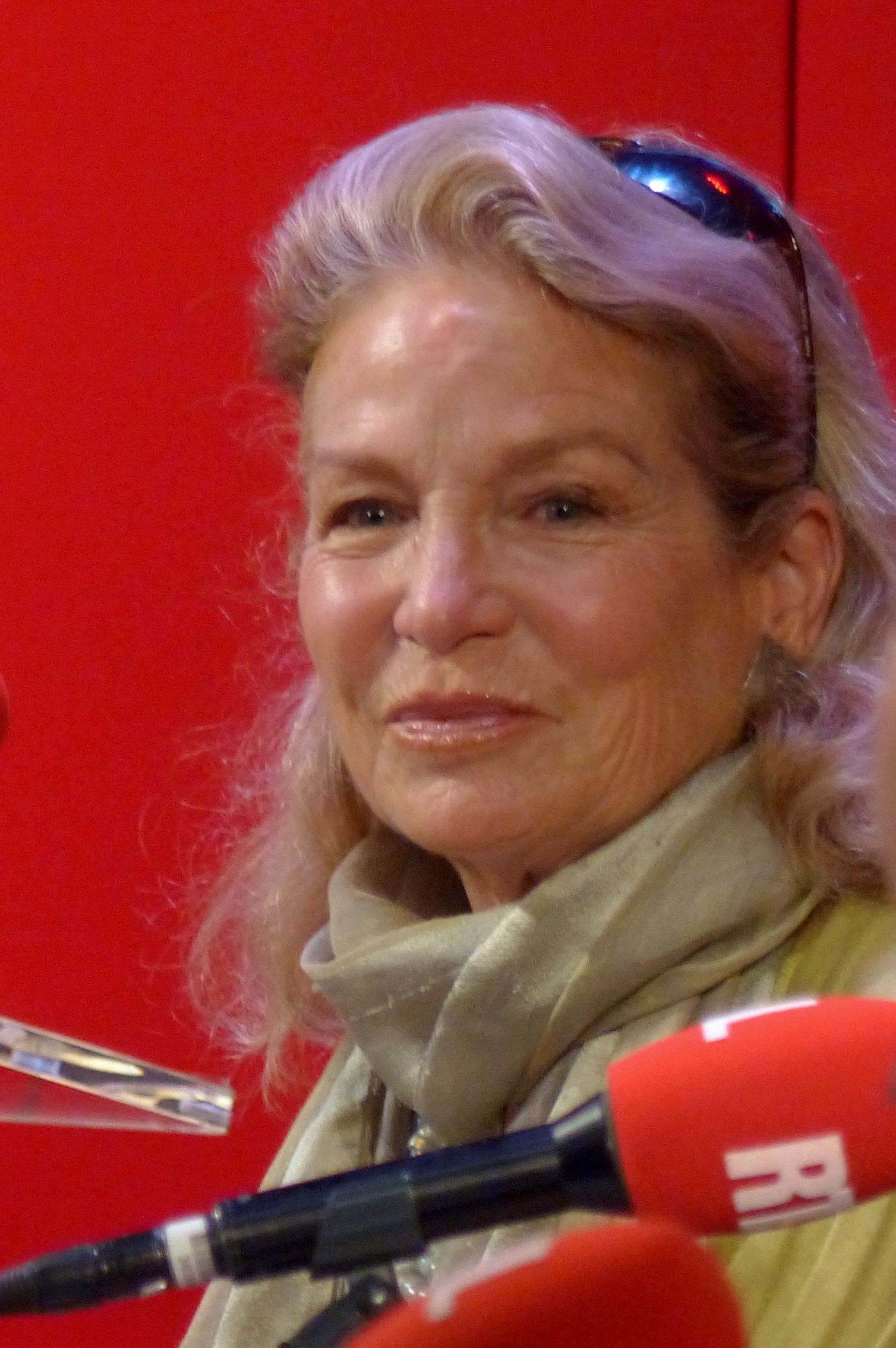
- Alexandra Stewart on Les Grosses Têtes radio program in 2014
- Born: June 10, 1939 (age 87); Montreal, Quebec, Canada
- Occupation: Actress
- Years active: 1956–present
- Partner: Louis Malle
- Children: 1

Alexandra Stewart (born June 10, 1939) is a Canadian actress.

== Biography ==
Born in Montreal, Quebec, Stewart left for Paris, France, in 1958, to study art. Within a year, she made her film debut in Les Motards, and has since then enjoyed a steady career in both French- and English-language films. Besides her cinema career, Stewart regularly appeared on television in shows such as Les Jeux de 20 heures and L'Académie des neuf. She has also appeared in the 1981 cartoon Space Stars and had cameos in Highlander: The Series, The Saint and Danger Man (TV Series). In 1966 Stewart appeared in The Saint (S5, E9 'The Better Mousetrap') as Natalie Sheridan, a love interest for Simon Templar (The Saint), who is solving a series of jewel thefts in Cannes. She is also the English-language narrator of Chris Marker's 1983 documentary, Sans Soleil. She was part of the jury of the 2004 Chicago International Film Festival.

== Personal life ==
Stewart has a daughter, Justine, with the French director Louis Malle.

== Selected filmography ==
- 1956 Women's Club (by Ralph Habib) (uncredited)
- 1959 Les Motards (by Jean Laviron) as La Speakerine
- 1959 Les Liaisons dangereuses as Une Amie de Miguel (uncredited)
- 1959 Two Men in Manhattan as Minor Role (uncredited)
- 1960 L'Eau à la bouche as Séraphine Brett-Juval / Fifine
- 1960 Le Bel âge (by Pierre Kast) as Alexandra
- 1960 Tarzan the Magnificent as Lori
- 1960 Trapped by Fear as Véra
- 1960 Thank You, Natercia as Sandra
- 1960 Exodus (by Otto Preminger) as Jordana Ben Canaan
- 1961 The End of Belle as Belle Shermann
- 1961 Les Mauvais Coups as Hélène
- 1961 The Season for Love as Sandra
- 1962 Une grosse tête (by Claude de Givray) as Françoise
- 1962 Climats (by Stellio Lorenzi) as Misa
- 1962 Le rendez-vous de minuit as Jacqueline
- 1962 Homage at Siesta Time as Marianne Graham
- 1963 Bekenntnisse eines möblierten Herrn (by Franz Peter Wirth) as Prinzessin
- 1963 Ro.Go.Pa.G. as Alexandra (segment "Il nuovo mondo")
- 1963 Violenza segreta as Elisabetta
- 1963 The Endless Night (by Will Tremper) as Juanita
- 1963 Le Feu follet (by Louis Malle) as Solange
- 1963 Dragées au poivre (by Jacques Baratier) as Anna, La Fille de Couverture
- 1963 And So to Bed (by Alfred Weidenmann) as Rektorengattin
- 1964 Full Hearts and Empty Pockets (by Camillo Mastrocinque) as Laura
- 1965 Man Called Gringo (by Roy Rowland) as Lucy Walton
- 1965 Mickey One (by Arthur Penn) as Jenny
- 1965 Thrilling (by Ettore Scola) as Frida (segment "Il vittimista")
- 1966 Marcia nuziale as Nancy
- 1967 Maroc 7 (by Gerry O'Hara) as Michelle Craig
- 1967 La loi du survivant as Hèléne
- 1968 L'Écume des Jours as Isis
- 1968 La mariée était en noir (by François Truffaut) as Mlle Becker
- 1968 Only When I Larf (by Basil Dearden) as Liz
- 1969 Bye bye, Barbara as Eve Michelli
- 1969 Waiting for Caroline (by Ron Kelly) as Caroline
- 1969 Umano, non umano (by Mario Schifano) as Marina
- 1970 Slap in the Face (by Rolf Thiele) as Celestine
- 1970 The Man Who Had Power Over Women (by John Krish) as Frances
- 1970 Kemek as Marisa Love
- 1970 Ils as Hélène Jeanteur
- 1971 Ciel bleu
- 1971 Zeppelin (by Etienne Périer) as Stephanie
- 1971 Valparaiso, Valparaiso as La Paysanne
- 1971 Où est passé Tom? as Alexandra
- 1972 Les soleils de l'île de Pâques as Alexandra
- 1972 Far from Dallas (by Philippe Tolédano) as Jean's Wife
- 1973 Sugar Cookies (uncredited)
- 1973 Because of the Cats (by Fons Rademakers) as Feodora
- 1973 Day for Night (by François Truffaut) as Stacey
- 1974 Bingo (by Jean-Claude Lord) as Hélène
- 1974 The Marseille Contract (by Robert Parrish) as Rita
- 1975 The Heatwave Lasted Four Days as Barbara Lawrence
- 1975 Black Moon (by Louis Malle) as Sister Lily
- 1976 Un animal doué de déraison (by Pierre Kast) as Alexandra
- 1977 Julie pot de colle (by Philippe de Broca) as Delphine
- 1977 The Uncanny (by Claude Héroux) as Mrs. Blake (segment "Quebec Province 1975")
- 1977 Good-bye, Emmanuelle (by François Leterrier) as Dorothée
- 1978 La petite fille en velours bleu (by Alan Bridges) as Théo Casarès
- 1978 In Praise of Older Women (by George Kaczender) as Paula
- 1980 Le Soleil en face (by Pierre Kast) as Sandra
- 1980 Agency (by George Kaczender) as Mimi
- 1980 Phobia (by John Huston) as Barbara Grey
- 1980 Final Assignment as Samantha O'Donnell
- 1981 Help Me Dream as Magda
- 1981 The Last Chase (by Martyn Burke) as Eudora
- 1981 Les Uns et les autres (by Claude Lelouch) as Alexandra
- 1981 Madame Claude 2 (by François Mimet) as Madame Claude
- 1981 Chanel Solitaire as Nathalie
- 1981 Your Ticket Is No Longer Valid as Clara
- 1982 Cercasi Gesù as Francesca's Mother
- 1982 Chassé-croisé as Une Femme Sculpteur
- 1982 Le Choc as La femme de la Première Victime (uncredited)
- 1982 La guérilléra as Alexandrine
- 1983 Femmes (by Tana Kaleya and Deva Tanmayo) as Alexandra
- 1984 Le Bon Plaisir as Julie Hoffman
- 1984 The Terrapin (La Terrapène) as Victor's mom
- 1984 Charlots Connection (by Jean Couturier) as Liane
- 1984 The Blood of Others (TV Movie, by Claude Chabrol) as Madeleine
- 1986 Peau d'ange as Héléna Werner
- 1987 Under the Cherry Moon (by Prince) as Mrs. Sharon
- 1988 Frantic (by Roman Polanski) as Edie
- 1988 The Passenger – Welcome to Germany as Mrs.
- 1989 Les Jeux de société (TV Movie)
- 1990 Monsieur (by Jean-Philippe Toussaint) as Madame Dubois-Lacour
- 1995 Le Fils de Gascogne (by Pascal Aubier)
- 1996 Seven Servants (by Daryush Shokof) as Hilda
- 2000 La Candide Madame Duff (by Jean-Pierre Mocky) as Tante Lou
- 2000 Sous le sable (by François Ozon) as Amanda
- 2001 Fifi martingale (by Jacques Rozier) as L'ambassadrice
- 2002 Les filles, personne s'en méfie as La Femme Cliente
- 2003 Rien, voilà l'ordre as Alexandra Stewart
- 2005 Mon petit doigt m'a dit... (by Pascal Thomas) as Mme Boscovan
- 2005 El cantor as Edna
- 2007 Fallen Heroes as La Madre di Bruno
- 2009 Bazar as Joanna
- 2011 Ma compagne de nuit as La Mère de Julia
- 2011 The Hidden Face as Emma
- 2013 Merry Christmas as Maya Dawn Lewis
- 2014 Valentin Valentin (by Pascal Thomas) as Sylvia
- 2015 La duchesse de Varsovie as Nina
- 2019 À cause des filles..? as La Mère de la Mariée

== Recognition ==
- From 23 to 25 November 1990, Alexandra Stewart presided over the 14th Festival international du film de création super 8 de Metz organised by Claude Kunowitz in partnership with the Mairie de Metz.
