= List of French films of 1996 =

A list of films produced in France in 1996.

Title	Director	Cast	Genre	Notes
L'Appartement	Gilles Mimouni	Vincent Cassel, Monica Bellucci	Drama	
Beaumarchais	Édouard Molinaro	Fabrice Luchini, Manuel Blanc	Adventure/Biopic	
The Best Job in the World	Gérard Lauzier			Entered into the 20th Moscow International Film Festival
La Bouche de Jean-Pierre	Lucile Hadžihalilović	Denise Aron-Schropfer	Drama	Screened at the 1996 Cannes Film Festival
Clubbed to Death	Yolande Zauberman	Élodie Bouchez		
A Couch in New York	Chantal Akerman	Juliette Binoche, William Hurt	Drama	
Encore	Pascal Bonitzer	Valeria Bruni Tedeschi	Romantic comedy	Won Prix Jean Vigo, +2 nominations
Fourbi	Alain Tanner	Karin Viard	Drama	
Irma Vep	Olivier Assayas	Maggie Cheung	Fantasy drama	Won KNF Award (Rotterdam 1997)
Le Jaguar	Francis Veber	Jean Reno, Patrick Bruel	Adventure comedy	
The Liars	Élie Chouraqui	Jean-Hugues Anglade	Drama	Entered into the 46th Berlin International Film Festival
Microcosmos	Claude Nuridsany, Marie Pérennou	Jacques Perrin, Kristin Scott Thomas	Documentary	
My Man	Bertrand Blier	Anouk Grinberg	Drama	Entered into the 46th Berlin International Film Festival
My Sex Life... or How I Got Into an Argument	Arnaud Desplechin	Mathieu Amalric, Emmanuelle Devos	Drama	Entered into the 1996 Cannes Film Festival
Nénette et Boni	Claire Denis	Gregoire Colin	Drama	
Ponette	Jacques Doillon	Victoire Thivisol	Drama	9 wins & 3 nominations
The Quiet Room	Rolf de Heer	Celine O'Leary, Chloe Ferguson, Paul Blackwell	Drama	Australian-Italian-French co-production
Ridicule	Patrice Leconte	Jean Rochefort, Fanny Ardant	Comedy drama	Nominated for Oscar, +12 wins, +12 nominations
Une robe d'été	François Ozon	Frédéric Mangenot	Short	2 wins & 1 nomination
A Saturday on Earth	Diane Bertrand	Elsa Zylberstein	Drama	Screened at the 1996 Cannes Film Festival
A Self Made Hero	Jacques Audiard	Mathieu Kassovitz, Albert Dupontel	Drama	
A Summer's Tale	Éric Rohmer	Melvil Poupaud, Amanda Langlet	Romance	Screened at the 1996 Cannes Film Festival
Thieves	André Téchiné	Daniel Auteuil, Catherine Deneuve	Drama	Entered into the 1996 Cannes Film Festival
Three Lives and Only One Death	Raoul Ruiz	Marcello Mastroianni, Anna Galiena	Comedy	2 wins & 1 nomination
When the Cat's Away	Cédric Klapisch	Garance Clavel	Romantic comedy	1 win & 3 nominations
