= Florence Darel =

French actress (born 1968)

- Born: 14 March 1968 (age 58); Paris, France
- Education: Le Grenier-Maurice Sarrazin
- Occupation: Actress
- Notable work: Uranus (1991)
- Spouse: Pascal Dusapin
- Children: 1

Florence Darel (born on 14 March 1968) is a French actress, known for her role as Natacha in A Tale of Springtime (1990), Camille de la Richardais in The Count of Monte Cristo (1998) and Faisane in Jalna (1994).

== Early life ==
Darel was born in Paris, France on 14 March 1968.

She was a pupil of Maurice Sarrazin, the creator of the Grenier de Toulouse, at his Parisian theater school Le Grenier-Maurice Sarrazin.

== Personal life ==
Darel is married to composer Pascal Dusapin with whom she had a son in 2009.

In October 2017, Darel claimed to have been sexually harassed by Harvey Weinstein, as well as by French producers, including Jacques Dorfmann.

== Filmography ==
- Erreur de jeunesse (1989)
- Les Jeux de société (television film, 1989)
- Le Champignon des Carpathes (1990)
- A Tale of Springtime (1990)
- Uranus (1990)
- The Stolen Children (1992)
- A comme Acteur (1992)
- Fausto (1993)
- Der Grüne Heinrich (1994)
- Joan the Maiden, Part 2: The Prisons (1994)
- Don't Let Me Die on a Sunday (1998)
- The Count of Monte Cristo (miniseries, 1998)
- Napoléon (miniseries, 2002)
- Le Intermittenze del cuore (2003)
- Là-haut, un roi au-dessus des nuages (2003)
- Un printemps à Paris (2006)
- La Maison (2007)
- Baby Love (2008)
- Femmes de loi (television film, 2009)
- Le Clan des Lanzac (television film, 2013)
- Soda: Un trop long week-end (television film, 2014)
- À demain sans faute (television film, 2015)
- Les Heures souterraines (television film, 2015)
