= Illtyd Trethowan =

British priest (1907–1993)

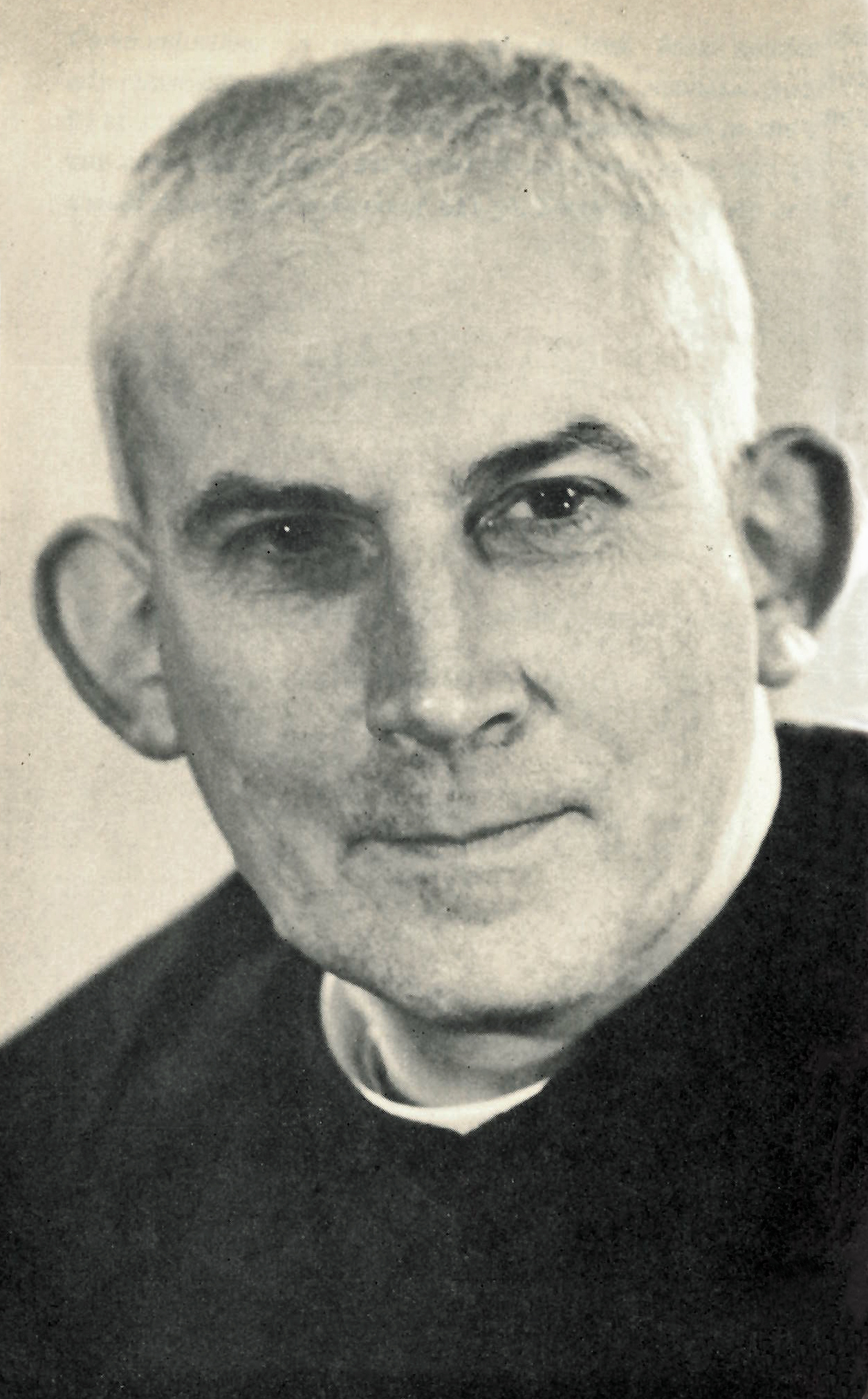
- Dom Illtyd Trethowan, O.S.B.
- Born: 27 May 1907; Salisbury, England
- Died: 30 October 1993 (aged 86); Bath, England
- Education: Felsted School; Brasenose College, Oxford
- Religion: Roman Catholic
- Writings: Author of several books and articles (see below)
- Offices held: Downside School: Classics and English Literature schoolmaster (1936-1982); Editor of the "Downside Review" (1946-1952, 1960-1964); Downside Abbey: Sub-Prior (1958-1991); Cathedral Prior of Ely (1991)

Illtyd Trethowan (12 May 1907 – 30 October 1993), born Kenneth Trethowan, was an English Benedictine monk, Roman Catholic priest, philosopher, theologian, and author.

== Early life ==
Born at Salisbury in 1907, Trethowan was the son of William James Trethowan, a solicitor, by his marriage to Emma Louisa van Kempen. He was baptised as William Kenneth in the Church of England and educated at Felsted School and Brasenose College, Oxford. While at Oxford, he contracted poliomyelitis and was left with a withered arm. In 1929 Trethowan was received into the Roman Catholic Church and took a job as a schoolmaster at the Oratory School, London, later transferring to Downside Abbey.

== Monastic life ==
Trethowan became a novice monk at Downside Abbey in 1932 and the same year was 'clothed' a monk under the name of Illtyd, in honour of Saint Illtud. In 1938, he was ordained a priest and from then on taught philosophy to junior monks in the monastery. From 1936 to 1982, he also taught Classics and later English literature at Downside School, a boarding school for boys then attached to the monastery.

Trethowan was the author of several religious books and many learned articles, translations and book reviews. From 1946 to 1952 and again from 1960 to 1964, he edited The Downside Review. He served as sub-prior of Downside Abbey between 1958 and 1991 and, when he retired, was given the honorary title of "Cathedral Prior of Ely". He was also a visiting professor in theology at Brown University.

Trethowan died at Bath, Somerset, on 30 October 1993, having said shortly before that he was happy to die. An obituary said of him:

Illtyd Trethowan was a man for whom God was the priority. In 61 years of unswervingly faithful monastic life, he lived what he taught: that it is possible for the human mind to be aware of God. He was... a gentle, learned, and always kind monk.

== Philosopher ==
A fearless thinker, Trethowan argued the centrality of contemplation and also that philosophical certainty about God was possible. He also worked to gain a greater audience for some less well-known writers, including Maurice Blondel and Dominique Dubarle. For philosophical inspiration, he looked to Augustine of Hippo. For over twenty years, he was in dialogue with Eric Mascall, with whose work Louis Bouyer draws comparisons, calling Trethowan "a born Augustinian, but of exceptional intellectual acuity".

Trethowan’s main contribution to the philosophy of religion is the argument that human awareness is intelligent and that the transcendent (divine, absolute, infinite) is implicit in it. "Illtyd’s proposal is that only in so far as we are (already) cognitively aware of infinite, transcendent reality can we sensibly talk of relations between things in the world and such reality." He argued that our knowledge of God is not a matter of propositional reasoning on the basis of empirical experience; the recognition of God’s presence to the mind was like waking up to what it meant for a human being to be intelligently aware of things, and he was content with a broadly Platonist or Augustinian approach to explaining that. Consequently he bridled at any argument for God’s existence he suspected of being inferential. "There is available to all humans a cognitive awareness of God that is direct, albeit arising in and mediated by self-awareness (not immediate): a contact thus with God to which one can point people, but which is not susceptible of strict 'description', or again 'proof'."

The concepts at the core of his thinking (preconceptual, direct but mediated awareness) are illustrated in the phenomenological example he gave in Mysticism and Theology:

A fly settles on my nose while I am asleep. There is physical contact, but I am not conscious of it. Then I wake up and become conscious of it – I may not at once recognise it as a fly, but I am aware of something tickling my nose. The fly has now established contact with me in a new way. It is present not just to my body but to my mind.

This kind of certainty fascinated Trethowan; it is the basis of his claim that our knowledge of God is given in experience. In the 1950s he defended it against criticisms of Modernism, but he felt the position was vindicated by Vatican II. It was a position that took its distance from the standard empiricism of his day which characterized much English-language academic philosophy of religion [e.g. Basil Mitchell, Antony Flew, Alasdair MacIntyre, and Richard Swinburne]. Trethowan had been educated in an Oxford dominated by ethical intuitionists like H.A. Prichard and W.D. Ross, and their non-natural theory of value was close to his own appreciation of the absolute in ethical experience, articulated most clearly in his books Absolute Value: a study in Christian theism and The Absolute and the Atonement. As noted by Baxter, Trethowan firmly held that:

It is from one’s awareness […] of an absolute summons from a power beyond oneself to accept value as it reveals itself to one, to accept the sources of value, that – once recognition emerges – one first comes to grasp what the term 'God' appropriately means.

But Trethowan argued no less tirelessly against efforts made in various forms of Thomism (as he saw it) to ground faith in reason rather than experience. His familiarity with several French thinkers of the nouvelle théologie was unusual in English theological circles before the Vatican Council. Bellenger noted that Trethowan was "particularly influential in introducing French Catholic philosophy to an English audience and in breaking the stranglehold of Thomism. Henri de Lubac (1896-1991) and Henri Bouillard (1908-1981), both victims of the official hostility to it in 1950, were important interlocutors for his own work; Dominique Dubarle (1907-1987) is another, a Dominican in fact, whose analysis of the modernist crisis interested him especially at the end of his life.

In relation to the mid-20th century tensions about the relation of philosophy to theology, Trethowan found a fellow spirit in Maurice Blondel (1861-1949). Like Blondel, Trethowan argued that left to its own resources philosophy can only reach an impasse, the only way out of which is to accept the notion of the transcendent, which opens the mind to the possibility of faith, the thesis of theology. (Trethowan’s contributions to Maurice Blondel may be found in The Letter on Apologetics and History and Dogma which Trethowan translated and edited with Alexander Dru). This approach to the concept of the supernatural is close to that of Henri de Lubac in his Surnaturel and to the early Karl Rahner

== Theologian ==
As a monastic thinker Illtyd Trethowan moved easily between the fields of theology, literature, and philosophy.

His first book on the theology of the Eucharist, as well as Christ in the Liturgy, anticipated issues that were to loom large in the Roman Catholic liturgical movement and at Vatican II. A reviewer of this book wrote that it "awakens hopes of a Christocentric synthesis the formulation of which would call forth his best from one who is by vocation a liturgist, is a theologian by trade and a philosopher by inclination." In his maturity he focused more on Christology than on Liturgy. His preoccupation for Christ’s human freedom seemed to bring him close to Nestorianism, but in other respects his approach, especially in soteriology and his discussion of sacrifice reflected classic Alexandrian preoccupations.

"Loving awareness of God" is Trethowan's definition of mysticism. He notes that "faith is the 'seed of glory' and so the seed of mysticism: it must therefore have a mystical character. It must involve a sort of seeing." He wrote that:

What sort of vision does faith involve? It may not seem to be a vision at all. It is the awareness of a power which one cannot rightly resist, the recognition of God’s love as inviting us to receive it as it overflows from a heart which is open to it as not other heart has ever been or will be.

His interest in Walter Hilton reflects his interweaving of Augustinian biblical and liturgical spirituality with the English mystical tradition linking the Cloud of Unknowing and English Benedictine life revived in the 17th century in people like Augustine Baker. Trethowan understood the apophatic tradition but, like Cuthbert Butler (1858-1934), Abbot of Downside (1906-1922) an influential voice in that tradition, always understood contemplative prayer as an interplay of light and darkness. A reviewer summarized the work of Trethowan by noting:

As regards Illtyd and his writing, I have long had the sense: Here is somebody who has been there with God, who is close to the heart of the matter, and who is now seeking, in ways whose conceptual specifics I may variously judge more, or less, well-attuned, to assist others to share this also. Here is somebody who can help us put one in touch with what really counts.

== Published works (selected) ==
=== Major publications ===
- 1948: Certainty, Philosophical and Theological (Dacre Press)
- 1952: Christ in the Liturgy (Sheed and Ward)
- 1953: The Meaning of Existence: a metaphysical enquiry (London: Longmans, Green) (with Dom Mark Pontifex)
- 1954: An Essay in Christian Philosophy (Longmans, Green)
- 1961: The Basis of Belief: an essay in the philosophy of religion (Burns & Oates)
- 1970: Absolute Value: a study in Christian theism (Allen & Unwin; Humanities Press)
- 1971: The Absolute and the Atonement (Allen and Unwin; Humanities Press)
- 1975: Mysticism and Theology-—an essay in Christian metaphysics (G. Chapman)
- 1975: Walter Hilton's "The Scale of Perfection" (ed. Trethowan) (Abbey Press)
- 1985: Process Theology and Christian Tradition (St Bede's Publications, Studies in Historical Theology series)

=== Translations ===
- 1940: Étienne Gilson, The Philosophy of St Bonaventure, translated by Dom Illtyd Trethowan and F. J. Sheed (London: Sheed and Ward)
- 1964: Maurice Blondel, The Letter on Apologetics and History and Dogma (edited and translated by Alexander Dru & Illtyd Trethowan, Harvill Press)
- 1989: Louis Bouyer, The Christian Mystery: from Pagan Myth to Christian Mysticism; translated [from the French Mysterion] by Illtyd Trethowan (Edinburgh: T. & T. Clark)

=== Other works ===
- "Alfred and the Great White Horse of Wiltshire", in The Downside Review, vol. 57 (1939), also published separately in paperback
- "Second Thoughts on Certainty" in The Downside Review 68 (1950) pp. 158–171
- "Physics and Metaphysics, comments on Sir Robert Watson-Watt's Electronics and Free-will", in The Hibbert Journal, vols 48–49 (1950), pp. 115–119
- "Natural theology and its relation to poetry" in Theology and the University, ed. John Coulson, DLT, London 1964, pp. 193–207
- "Self-Awareness and Natural Morality", in Theology, vol. 69 (1966), pp. 23–25
- "Christology Again" in The Downside Review 95 (1977) pp. 1–10
- "God’s changelessness" in Clergy Review 64 (1979) pp. 15–21
- "Kerr on Cartesianism in Catholic Thought: Right or Wrong?" in New Blackfriars 65 (1984) pp. 473–486
- "Third Thoughts on Certainty" in The Downside Review 103 (1985) pp. 239–255
- "How is Christ’s Risen Life relevant to other people’s salvation?" in Heythrop Journal 28 (1987) pp. 144–164
- "Augustine the Philosopher" in St Augustine, vol. 11 (1987) pp. 118–127
