= Verdelot =

Verdelot may refer to:

- Philippe Verdelot (c. 1480–1530), French composer of the Renaissance
- Verdelot, Seine-et-Marne, a place in France
