= Breathless (1960 film) =

1960 French film by Jean-Luc Godard

- Theatrical release poster
- French: À bout de souffle
- Directed by: Jean-Luc Godard
- Screenplay by: Jean-Luc Godard
- Story by: François Truffaut
- Produced by: Georges de Beauregard
- Starring: Jean-Paul Belmondo; Jean Seberg; Henri-Jacques Huet; Liliane Dreyfus; Claude Mansard; Van Doude; Daniel Boulanger
- Cinematography: Raoul Coutard
- Edited by: Cécile Decugis
- Music by: Martial Solal
- Production company: Les Films Impéria
- Distributed by: Société nouvelle de cinématographie
- Release date: 16 March 1960
- Running time: 90 minutes
- Country: France
- Languages: French; English
- Budget: FRF 400,000(US$80,000)
- Box office: 2,295,912 admissions (France)

Breathless (French: À bout de souffle, lit. 'Out of Breath') is a 1960 French New Wave crime drama film written and directed by Jean-Luc Godard. It stars Jean-Paul Belmondo as a wandering criminal named Michel, and Jean Seberg as his American girlfriend Patricia. The film was Godard's first feature-length work and represented Belmondo's breakthrough as an actor.

Breathless is an influential example of French New Wave (nouvelle vague) cinema. Along with François Truffaut's The 400 Blows and Alain Resnais's Hiroshima mon amour, both released a year earlier, it brought international attention to new styles of French filmmaking. At the time, Breathless attracted much attention for its bold visual style, which included then unconventional use of jump cuts.

Upon its initial release in France, the film attracted over two million viewers. It has since been considered one of the best films ever made, repeatedly appearing in Sight & Sound magazine's decennial polls of filmmakers and critics on the subject. In May 2010, a fully restored version of the film was released in the United States to coincide with the film's 50th anniversary.

American film critic of the time, Pauline Kael, called it the most important New Wave film to reach the United States.

== Plot ==
Michel Poiccard, a young and brash criminal who idolizes American movie gangsters, steals a car in Marseille and heads for Paris. On the Route nationale 7, he impulsively shoots and kills a motorcycle policeman after being pursued for crossing a solid line. Now a wanted man, he arrives in Paris and seeks out Patricia Franchini, an American student and aspiring journalist, with whom he had a recent affair. Patricia wants to study at the Sorbonne and sells the New York Herald Tribune on the Champs-Élysées. Michel ultimately persuades Patricia to sleep with him again, though she remains uncertain about their relationship and Michel's criminal behavior, and is unwilling to accede to his desire to run away to Rome together.

Michel hides out in Patricia's apartment and various hotel rooms, trying to evade the police while also attempting to collect money he is owed by various acquaintances. The police eventually identifies him as the RN7 murderer, and his photograph is published on the front covers of major newspapers. When questioned by a detective, Patricia initially refuses to turn him in, and loses the other detective tailing her.

While waiting for an acquaintance to help him cash a check, Michel and Patricia hide out at the house of a friend's friend. Patricia ultimately contacts the police and reveals Michel's location. Unsure of whether she wants to protect him or destroy him, Patricia tells Michel that the authorities are on their way, but Michel refuses to flee. He is shot in the back when the police arrive and runs down the street until he collapses, mortally wounded. As he lies dying, Michel speaks a few cryptic words to Patricia, which she struggles to understand. She then looks directly into the camera and touches her lips, mirroring Michel's frequent gesture.

== Cast ==
Jean Seberg and Jean-Paul Belmondo in Breathless

- Jean-Paul Belmondo as Michel Poiccard/Laszlo Kovacs
- Jean Seberg as Patricia Franchini
- Daniel Boulanger as Police Inspector Vital
- Henri-Jacques Huet as Antonio Berruti
- Roger Hanin as Carl Zumbach
- Van Doude as Van Doude
- Liliane Dreyfus as Liliane
- Jean-Pierre Melville as Parvulesco
- Jean-Luc Godard as an informer
- Richard Balducci as Tolmachoff
- Philippe de Broca as a journalist
- Jean Douchet as a journalist
- Gérard Brach as a photographer
- Andre S. Labarthe as a journalist
- Jacques Rivette as the body of the man hit by a car

== Production ==
=== Background and writing ===
Breathless was loosely based on a newspaper article that François Truffaut read in The News in Brief about Michel Portail and his American journalist girlfriend Beverly Lynette. In November 1952, Portail stole a car to visit his sick mother in Le Havre and ended up killing a motorcycle cop named Grimberg. Truffaut wrote a treatment with Claude Chabrol, but they disagreed on the story structure.

Godard was working as a press agent at 20th Century Fox when he met producer Georges de Beauregard. He helped Beauregard with the script for Pêcheur d'Islande, but pitched him on Breathless because he liked the treatment. Chabrol and Truffaut were now star directors. They were at the Cannes Film Festival in May 1959 when they wrote Beauregard to endorse Godard as the director. Their names helped greenlight the film, but both would have very small roles in its production.

The final screenplay deviates very little from Truffaut's original treatment, aside from the much longer bedroom scene. Godard wrote the script as he went along. He told Truffaut, "the subject will be the story of a boy who thinks of death and of a girl who doesn't." Truffaut believed Godard's change to the ending was personal, "In my script, the film ends with the boy walking along the street as more and more people turn and stare after him, because his photo's on the front of all the newspapers... Jean-Luc chose a violent end because he was by nature sadder than I."

Godard used screenwriter Paul Gégauff, who was known as a swaggering seducer of women, as inspiration for Michel's character. Fellow New Wave director Jacques Rivette appears in a cameo as the dead body of a man hit by a car in the street. The film includes many in-jokes like the young woman selling Cahiers du Cinéma and Michel's occasional alias of Laszlo Kovacs, the name of Belmondo's character in Chabrol's 1959 film Web of Passion.

Jean-Paul Belmondo was not famous outside of France prior to Breathless. In order to broaden the film's commercial appeal, Godard sought a prominent leading lady who would be willing to work in his low-budget film. He came to Jean Seberg through his acquaintance with her husband Francois Moreuil. In June 1959, Seberg agreed to appear in the film for $15,000, one-sixth of the film's budget. Godard gave Moreuil a cameo in the film. During filming, Seberg privately questioned Godard's style and wondered if the film would be commercially viable. After it was a success, she reprised her character in Godard's Le Grand Escroc. Pauline Kael, The New Yorker film critic, called Belmondo the most exciting actor since the appearance of Marlon Brando.

Godard wanted cinematographer Michel Latouche to shoot the film after working with him on his short films. Instead, De Beauregard hired Raoul Coutard, who he had on contract.

The 1958 ethno-fiction Moi, un noir has been credited as a key influence for Godard. This can be seen in the adoption of jump-cuts, use of real locations rather than constructed sets and the documentary, newsreel format of filming.

=== Filming ===
Godard envisaged Breathless as a documentary and tasked cinematographer Raoul Coutard to shoot the entire film on a hand-held camera with next to no lighting. In order to shoot under low-light levels, Coutard had to use Ilford HP5 film, which was not available as motion picture film stock at the time. It is very often claimed that he therefore took 18-metre lengths of HP5 film sold for 35mm still cameras and spliced them into 120-metre rolls, but Coutard has denied this, saying that no splicing took place. During development he pushed the negative one stop from 400 ASA to 800 ASA.

The size of the sprocket holes in the photographic film was different from that of motion picture film, and the Eclair Cameflex camera was the only camera that worked for the film used. Nearly the entire film had to be dubbed in post-production because the Cameflex was noisy and incapable of synchronized sound.

Filming ran 23 days from August 17 until September 12, 1959. It included President Eisenhower's visit to Paris, which Godard used as a backdrop for the film. The crew met at Café Notre Dame and shot for two hours until Godard ran out of ideas. According to Coutard, the film was virtually improvised on the spot, and Godard wrote dialogue in an exercise book that no one was allowed to see. Godard gave lines to Belmondo and Seberg with only brief rehearsals before filming.

Locations were selected in advance, and assistant director Pierre Rissient described the shoot as very organized. However, filming was done without permits, adding to the spontaneous feel Godard wanted. Michel's death was filmed on the rue Campagne-Première in Paris. Actor Richard Balducci said shooting days could range from 15 minutes to 12 hours, depending on how many ideas Godard had. Producer Georges de Beauregard wrote a letter to the crew complaining about the erratic shooting schedule. Coutard claimed Beauregard got in a fistfight with Godard when he found the director at a café on a day when he had called in sick.

Godard shot the movie's first sequence toward the end, but most of the filming was chronological. There was minimal crew and no lights for the bedroom scene with Michel and Patricia at the Hôtel de Suède. Godard was determined to shoot there after living at the hotel in the early 1950s. Instead of renting a dolly with complicated and time-consuming tracks to lay, Godard often pushed Coutard in a wheelchair. For certain street scenes, Coutard hid in a postal cart with a hole for the lens and packages piled on top of him.

=== Editing ===
Breathless was processed and edited at GTC Labs in Joinville by Cécile Decugis and her assistant Lila Herman. Decugis said the film earned a pre-release reputation as the worst film of the year.

Pierre Rissient said that the jump cut style was not intended during the film's shooting or the initial stages of editing. Coutard said that "there was a panache in the way it was edited that didn't match at all the way it was shot. The editing gave it a very different tone than the films we were used to seeing." The film's use of jump cuts has been called innovative. Andrew Sarris analyzed it as existentially representing "the meaninglessness of the time interval between moral decisions."

=== Publicity ===
Godard and his media-savvy friends were well-positioned to gin up publicity before the movie was released. Richard Balducci was in charge of promoting the film and he embedded a reporter from France-Observateur in the crew to report on the production. A novelization by Claude Francolin was released in February 1960, a month before the film's release. Columbia also issued a soundtrack album of Martial Solal's music.

== Reception ==
Awards for Breathless

Prix Jean Vigo (1960)
- Best Film: Jean-Luc Godard

10th Berlin International Film Festival
- Silver Bear for Best Director: Jean-Luc Godard
- Golden Bear: Jean-Luc Godard (nominated)

15th British Academy Film Awards
- Best Foreign Actress: Jean Seberg (nominated)

French Syndicate of Cinema Critics
- Best French Film (tied with Le Trou)

Breathless was on the cover of Cahiers du cinéma's January issue, months before its release. That same month, Godard was awarded the Prix Jean Vigo for his work on the film. Luc Moullet wrote, "Of all the films now being made by the newcomers to French cinema, À bout de souffle is not the best, since Les 400 coups has a head start on it; it is not the most striking - we have Hiroshima mon amour for that. But it is the most representative." By June of that year, it was already pointed to as "the crowning point of the new wave".

Reception for the film was mixed. The Examiner critic complained that he was unable to connect with the characters and called the film a "hodge-podge."

Bosley Crowther called the film a "fascinating communication" which is "emphatically unrestrainedly vicious, completely devoid of moral tone" and shocking due to the "vigor of its reportorial candor". Crowther described Godard's editing as "pictorial cacophony". He saw Belmondo as "hypnotically ugly" and "the most effective cigarette-mouther and thumb-to-lip rubber since time began". Archer Winsten deemed it "a very fine piece of work". Though he found the film too insubstantial to be remembered, he concluded "the technique should linger, and so should these talents, here so highly visible and memorable."

In a 1972 essay about Breathless, Oliver Stone zeroed in on the bedroom scenes as the core of the film. He explains the rigidity of cinematic bedroom scenes with their "definite pace from window to bed and climactically into the sheets. Even in the rather perverse imaginations of Vadim or Chabrol, these basic rhythms operate. With Godard, no such thing."

Richard Brody enthused, "Breathless opened...not in an art house but at a chain of four commercial theaters, selling 259,046 tickets in four weeks. The eventual profit was substantial...The film's success with the public corresponded to its generally ardent and astonished critical reception."

The New York Times critic A. O. Scott wrote in 2010, 50 years after the release of Breathless, that it is both "a pop artifact and a daring work of art" and even at 50, "still cool, still new, still – after all this time! – a bulletin from the future of movies." Roger Ebert included it on his "Great Movies" list in 2003, writing that "No debut film since Citizen Kane in 1942 has been as influential," dismissing its jump cuts as the biggest breakthrough, and instead calling revolutionary its "headlong pacing, its cool detachment, its dismissal of authority, and the way its narcissistic young heroes are obsessed with themselves and oblivious to the larger society."

The film has a 95% score on Rotten Tomatoes, based on 81 reviews. Its critical consensus states, "Breathless rewrote the rules of cinema -- and more than 50 years after its arrival, Jean-Luc Godard's paradigm-shifting classic remains every bit as vital". On Metacritic, the film has a score of 96 out of 100, based on 24 reviews, indicating "universal acclaim".

Some modern critics have noted themes of sexism embodied in the protagonist.

== Themes ==
Oliver Stone invokes Friedrich Nietzsche's metaphor of the "last man" during his analysis of Patricia. Stone paraphrases Thus Spoke Zarathustra, "What is pain? What is love? What is creation?...What is a star? What is anything anymore?" Stone concludes that such philosophical skepticism is a logical endpoint for a character like Patricia.

Hubert Dreyfus sees the film as exemplifying Nietzsche's conception of ("active" versus "passive") nihilism. Michel is carelessly active and bold. He falls in love with Patricia, who is uncomfortable in such engagements. Her cooperation with the police leads to his death. Patricia's monotone reaction to Michel's death indicates her brutal distance to relationships. Michel knew her coldness would end badly for him.

=== Closing dialogue ===
Michel's dying words are mumbled and hard to hear: "C'est vraiment dégueulasse". Throughout the film, "dégueulasse" has been clearly used to mean "disgusting" in reference to things like Michel's request for a loan and the music of Frédéric Chopin. The word has many other implications in French. It can be a synonym for "bitch" or "heel", as well as implying nausea and the urge to vomit. In French, bouche refers to the human mouth, while gueule means the wider mouth of an animal, e.g. dog, though commonly used for mouth and derogatory only in certain expressions, e.g. "ferme ta gueule" (shut your trap).

Original
MICHEL: C'est vraiment dégueulasse.
PATRICIA: Qu'est-ce qu'il a dit?
VITAL: Il a dit que vous êtes vraiment "une dégueulasse".
PATRICIA: Qu'est-ce que c'est "dégueulasse"?

English
MICHEL: It's really disgusting.
PATRICIA: What did he say?
VITAL: He said you are really disgusting.
PATRICIA: What is "disgusting"?

Subsequent releases of the film have differing translations:

Fox-Lorber DVD (2001)
MICHEL: It's disgusting, really.
PATRICIA: What did he say?
VITAL: He said "You're a real scumbag".
PATRICIA: What's a scumbag?

Criterion Collection DVD (2007)/Restoration (2010)
MICHEL: Makes me want to puke.
PATRICIA: What did he say?
VITAL: He said you make him want to puke.
PATRICIA: What's that mean, "puke"?

=== References to other films ===
Breathless is shot through with constant in-jokes and references to other films:

- Forty Guns (Sam Fuller): Godard imitates the POV shot through a barrel of a gun which cuts to a couple kissing.
- Ten Seconds to Hell (Robert Aldrich): A poster with the tagline "To live dangerously till the end!" is shown shortly after Michel meets Patricia.
- Pushover (Richard Quine)
- Where the Sidewalk Ends (Otto Preminger)
- Whirlpool (Otto Preminger): playing when Patricia attempts to lose the police officer who is following her.
- Bonjour Tristesse (Otto Preminger): Godard said Patricia was a continuation of Seberg's character Cécile.
- The Maltese Falcon (John Huston): Michel paraphrases a line of dialogue from the film about always falling in love with the wrong women.
- The Glass Key (Dashiell Hammett): Michel is criticized for wearing silk socks with a tweed jacket in a reference to the Hammett novel.
- Bob le flambeur (Jean-Pierre Melville): Michel refers to Bob Montagné being in jail.
- The Harder They Fall (Mark Robson): Michel imitates the Humphrey Bogart film's lobby card.
- High Sierra (Raoul Walsh): Seberg's final moments are modeled on Ida Lupino's blank stare at Humphrey Bogart's corpse.
- Breathless is dedicated to Monogram Pictures, which Jonathan Rosenbaum called "a critical statement of aims and boundaries".

== Legacy ==
Godard said the success of Breathless was a mistake. He added "there used to be just one way. There was one way you could do things. There were people who protected it like a copyright, a secret cult only for the initiated. That's why I don't regret making Breathless and blowing that all apart." The massive post-war influx of American films (due to the 1946 Blum-Byrnes agreement) had provided the subversive substrate. In 1964, Godard described his and his colleagues' impact: "We barged into the cinema like cavemen into the Versailles of Louis XV."

The British Film Institute included the film on several lists in its Sight and Sound magazine:

- 1992: Critic's Poll, #22
- 2002: Critic's Poll, #15
- 2012: Top Films of All Time, #13
- 2012: Directors' Top Films, #11
- 2022: Critics' Top Films of All Time, #38
- 2022: Director's Top Films of All Time, #15

The BBC has also listed Breathless:

- 2018: Greatest Foreign Language Films, #11

== See also ==
- Breathless, a 1983 American remake starring Richard Gere in the Belmondo role and Valérie Kaprisky in the Seberg role
- Nouvelle Vague, a 2025 film directed by Richard Linklater that follows the shooting of Breathless, starring Guillaume Marbeck as Jean-Luc Godard, Zoey Deutch as Jean Seberg, and Aubry Dullin as Jean-Paul Belmondo
- List of cult films
- List of French-language films
- List of films considered the best
