= La Cambrure =

La Cambrure (aka: The Curve)
- Directed by: Edwige Shaki
- Written by: Edwige Shaki
- Produced by: Françoise Etchegaray
- Starring: Edwige Shaki; François Rauscher; André Del Debbio
- Cinematography: Diane Baratier
- Edited by: Mary Stephen
- Music by: Claude Debussy
- Production company: Compagnie Eric Rohmer (CER)
- Release date: May 1999 (Cannes Film Festival)
- Running time: 16 minutes
- Country: France
- Language: French

La Cambrure (The Curve) is a 1999 French short film shot on video, directed by Edwige Shaki, who also wrote the scenario. Éric Rohmer was a technical advisor for the short, which was produced by his production company. Despite being directed by Shaki, some of Rohmer's trademarks—such as extensive dialog and beautiful young actors, including Shaki herself—are present.

The film was the first digital cinema production to be presented in a commercial theater, at the Cannes Film Festival in May 1999. It was produced in preparation for Rohmer's feature film The Lady and the Duke (2001), in which Shaki also appeared.

== Summary ==
Art history student Roman falls in love with art student Eva, who he thinks was the inspiration for a sculpture by his uncle. She plays along as he compares her to the women in various paintings, but also rebels at being objectified, wanting to be loved for herself. When Roman learns the sculpture was based on someone else, he tells Eva that the first thing he noticed about her was really her eyes, rather than her figure, and they embrace.

== Cast ==
- Edwige Shaki as Eva
- François Rauscher as Roman
- André Del Debbio as the sculptor, Roman's uncle

== Home media ==
La Cambrure is included as a special feature on The Criterion Collection DVD release of Rohmer's Claire's Knee (1970). The short and feature are thematically linked, in that they both address, in a playful way, the fetishisation of the female body.

== Reception ==
Tim Lucas of Sight & Sound described La Cambrure as "a delightful exploration of art's role in sexual aesthetics and the objectification of desire".
