= Brice Parain =

French philosopher and essayist

- Born: March 10, 1897; Courcelles-sous-Jouarre
- Died: March 20, 1971 (aged 74); Verdelot, Seine-et-Marne
- Resting place: Cimetière de Verdelot
- Education: Institut national des langues et civilisations orientales, École normale supérieure (Paris)
- Occupation: Philosopher
- Spouses: Nathalie Tchelpanova (m. 1926; died 1958) Éliane Pérès (1961–1971)
- Relatives: Charles Parain (brother)

Brice Parain (10 March 1897 – 20 March 1971) was a French philosopher and essayist.

He appeared as himself in Jean-Luc Godard's 1962 film Vivre sa vie. In Éric Rohmer's film My Night at Maud's (1969), conversations about Pascal's Wager are directly inspired by a similar debate between Parain and Dominique Dubarle in an episode of the television series En profil dans le texte called l'Entretien sur Pascal ("The Interview on Pascal") in 1965, also produced by Rohmer.

== Biography ==
Brice Parain was born in 1897 in Courcelles-sous-Jouarre, Seine-et-Marne, Île-de-France. He studied at the ENS and graduated from the École des Langues Orientales. He also served as an agrégé of philosophy in 1922.

After graduating from Langues Orientales, Parain became a cultural attaché and visited the USSR for the first time in 1925. Two years later, he returned to France, where he met Jean Paulhan and began working as a secretary for Gaston Gallimard.

Parain was primarily interested in the great intellectual and political movements of his time; his work focused in particular on Communism, Surrealism, and Existentialism, the failures of which he anticipated in part in some of his earlier works, such as Essai sur la misère humaine (1934) and Retour à la France (1936). Parain supported the newspaper Le Nouveau Détective ("The New Detective"), founded by Joseph and Georges Kessel in 1928 and specialising in the evocation of miscellaneous facts. Parain was also fascinated by linguistics. Critic Charles Blanchard dubbed him "le Sherlock Holmes du langage" ("the Sherlock Holmes of language"). Parain was particularly interested in the questions of the origin and evolution of words, expounded upon in essays such as Essay sur le Logos platonicien (1942), Recherches sur la nature et la fonction du langage (1942), and Sur la dialectique (1953).

After the Second World War, Parain worked alongside Robert Antelme and André Breton, among others, at the magazine Le 14 juillet, against Charles de Gaulle's return to power in 1958. Parain edited the first volume of L'histoire de la philosophe in the Encyclopédie de la Pléiade. During the post-war period, Parain published numerous works, including a novel, Joseph (1964); a play, Noir sur blanc (1962); and various essays, De fil en aiguille (1960), France, marchande d'églises (1966), and Petite métaphysique du langage (1969).

Parain was one of the chief collaborators in the beginnings of Éditions Gallimard (since 1927), as well as a close friend of the Gallimard brothers, particularly Gaston. He was the principal director of the Encyclopédie de la Pléiade collection, and translated various Russian classic works published through Gallimard, including works by Lev Tolstoy, Anton Chekhov, and Aleksandr Pushkin.

== Personal life ==
Although Parain was active in French Communist circles, and was initially attracted to Communism, he separated from the movement in the 1930s, and did not identify as a Communist. At the forefront of the Russian Revolution, Parain, who spoke Russian fluently and corresponded with various Russian writers, was critical of the new system.

Parain spent most of his life in Sceaux, Hauts-de-Seine, where he wrote the majority of his work. In 1926 Parain married the Russian illustrator Nathalie Tchelpanova. After Tchelpanova's death in 1958, Parain married Éliane Pérès, a painter, in 1961, with whom he would reside until his death. He owned a house, Le Pressoir, in Verdelot, Seine-et-Marne, where he is interred alongside Tchelpanova.

== Selected publications ==
- Essai sur la misère humaine, Grasset, 1934
- Retour à la France, Grasset, 1936
- Recherches sur la nature et les fonctions du langage, Gallimard, 1942 (doctoral thesis)
- Essai sur le logos platonicien, Gallimard, 1942
- La Mort de Jean Madec, Grasset, 1945
- L’Embarras du choix, Gallimard, 1947
- La Mort de Socrate, Gallimard, 1950
- Sur la dialectique, Gallimard, 1953
- De fil en aiguille, Gallimard, 1960
- Noir sur blanc, Gallimard, 1962
- Joseph, Gallimard, 1964
- Entretiens avec Bernard Pingaud, Gallimard, 1966
- France, marchande d’églises, Gallimard, 1966
- Petite métaphysique de la parole, Gallimard, 1969
- Le Sophiste annoté, suivi de l’Invité de Pierre Pachet, Le Nouveau commerce, 1995
- Brice Parain, Georges Perros : correspondance, 1960-1971, Gallimard, 1998
