= Zouzou (model) =

French actress, model, and singer

- Born: Danièle Ciarlet; November 29, 1943 (age 82); Blida, French Algeria
- Occupations: Model; actress; singer
- Years active: 1962–2013
- Partner: Brian Jones

Zouzou (born Danièle Ciarlet on November 29, 1943) is a French actress, model, singer and icon of the 1960s and early 1970s. She is known largely for her lead role of Chloé in Éric Rohmer's Love in the Afternoon (1972).

The screen name "Zouzou" reportedly stems from her zézaiement (lisp) of the consonants 's', 'j' and 'z'.

== Personal life ==
Zouzou obtained her baccalauréat at 14, then enrolled at the Artistic Training Centre of the Académie Charpentier.

The news magazine Paris Match baptised her "la twisteuse". She represented the liberated young women, who were active during the civil unrest of May 68, as indeed Zouzou was.

She moved to Swinging London with Brian Jones of the Rolling Stones, but left him and returned to Paris.

== Career ==
After appearing in some short films, Zouzou came to international prominence in 1972 in Rohmer's Love in the Afternoon as Chloé. She was featured in French film and TV throughout the 1970s. In 1978, she left Paris for the Antilles where she remained for seven years as her career waned. She returned to France in 1985.

In 2002, Zouzou co-starred in the short film Signe d'hiver ("Sign of winter"), directed by Jean-Claude Moireau and also starring Marie Rousseau and Cyrille Thouvenin. In 2003, her autobiography, Jusqu' à l' aube ("Until dawn"), co-written with Olivier Nicklaus, was published by Flammarion. At the beginning of 2004, a retrospective of Zouzou was organized by Centre Georges Pompidou. In 2005, Zouzou appeared at the Sentier des Halles club in Paris.

== Selected filmography ==
- Le Lit De La Vierge (1970)
- Love in the Afternoon (1972)
- S*P*Y*S (1974)
- The Last Woman (1976)
- Sky Riders (1976)
