= I Think I Love My Wife =

2007 film by Chris Rock

- Promotional movie poster
- Directed by: Chris Rock
- Screenplay by: Louis C.K. Chris Rock
- Based on: Love in the Afternoon by Éric Rohmer
- Produced by: Chris Rock; Lisa Stewart
- Starring: Chris Rock; Kerry Washington; Gina Torres; Steve Buscemi
- Cinematography: William Rexer
- Edited by: Wendy Greene Bricmont
- Music by: Marcus Miller
- Production companies: UTV Motion Pictures; Zahrlo Productions; Chris Rock Productions
- Distributed by: Fox Searchlight Pictures
- Release dates: March 7, 2007 (Los Angeles); March 16, 2007 (United States)
- Running time: 93 minutes
- Country: United States
- Language: English
- Budget: $11–14 million
- Box office: $13.8 million

I Think I Love My Wife is a 2007 American romantic comedy film starring Chris Rock, Kerry Washington and Gina Torres. Rock co-wrote the film with Louis C.K. and also directed and produced it. It is a remake of the 1972 French film Love in the Afternoon by Éric Rohmer. The film was released by Fox Searchlight Pictures on March 16, 2007, and received generally negative reviews from critics while grossing $13.8 million against an $11–14 million budget.

== Plot ==
Richard Cooper is a happily married and successful man. He is content with his home life in suburban New York with his lovely wife Brenda, a teacher, and his two young children Kelly & Brian. There is one problem in his marriage: their sex life has stagnated, leaving Richard frustrated and sex-starved. While at work, he occasionally fantasizes about other women, but never acts upon his impulses.

An encounter with an attractive old friend, Nikki Tru, suddenly casts doubt over his typically resilient self-control. At first she claims to just want to be his friend, but she begins to show up consistently at his Manhattan financial office just to talk or have lunch, which causes his boss, secretaries, and peers to view him with varying degrees of contempt. When Nikki begins to deliberately seduce Richard, he does not know what to do. Against his better judgment, he flies with her out of town for one day on an errand, where he is beaten by her boyfriend. On the way home, Nikki kisses Richard who stops it quickly.

Returning to New York, he returns too late to make a sales presentation at an important business meeting, causing the loss of a lucrative contract and almost his job in the process. Richard reluctantly pursues Nikki still, but when tensions are deep with a suspicious Brenda, he breaks things off with her. Things slowly improve in Richard's usual routine and love life. Months later, Nikki shows up at his office unannounced. Having lunch, Richard learns that she is currently engaged to another successful man, and of her realization that she's getting older. Nikki later admits she's not in love with him and that she refuses to settle. Telling Richard that the two of them would be very happy together, he says regardless of his desires, his life isn't about what he wants.

Hearing this, Nikki says she and her fiancé are set to move to Los Angeles, with Nikki asking Richard to come to her apartment later to say a "proper goodbye". The morning of, he is conflicted. When he gets to Nikki's apartment, he finds her in her underwear in her bathroom. In the moments before Richard is about to consummate his attraction to Nikki, he realizes how grave the loss of his wife and children would be, so he walks out on Nikki, musing that you can't choose who you love in life, but you can choose how you love. Richard returns home, surprising his wife, and they begin to rebuild a genuine rapport, with the possibility of good things to come.

== Cast ==
- Chris Rock as Richard Cooper
- Kerry Washington as Nikki Tru
- Gina Torres as Brenda Cooper
- Edward Herrmann as Mr. Landis
- Steve Buscemi as George
- Cassandra Freeman as Jennifer
- Welker White as Mary
- Wendell Pierce as Sean
- Christina Vidal as Candy
- Adam LeFevre as Maitre'd
- Samantha Ivers as Tracy
- Michael K. Williams as Teddy
- Orlando Jones as Nelson
- Eva Pigford as Hope
- Stephen A. Smith as Allan
- James Saito as Mr. Yuni
- Milan Howard as Kelly Cooper
- Roz Ryan as Landlady
- Eliza Coupe as Lisa
- GQ as White Rapper

== Production ==
Charles Stone III was slated to direct but dropped out.

== Reception ==
Rotten Tomatoes reported an approval rating of 19% based on 116 reviews, with an average rating of 4.8/10. The website's critics consensus reads: "Chris Rock's comedic instincts are muted and the female characters are unsatisfactorily drawn in this uneven sex farce/domestic drama mashup." Metacritic assigned the film a weighted average score of 49 out 100 based on 30 critics, indicating "mixed or average" reviews.

=== Box office ===
The film grossed $5 million on its opening weekend, finishing #5. The film grossed a worldwide total of $13.6 million.

=== Home media ===
The DVD was released on August 7, 2007, selling 214,778 units in the first week. At an aggregate, 863,437 units were sold which translated to revenue of $13.5 million.
