= Aurora Cornu =

Romanian writer and actress (1931–2021)

Aurora Cornu (6 December 1931 – 14 March 2021) was a Romanian-born French writer, actress, film director, and translator. Her best known role is that of Aurora in Éric Rohmer's Claire's Knee.

== Biography ==
She was born in Provița de Jos, Prahova County, Romania. An independent spirit, she ran away three times from home, the last time permanently at the age of 14. She was adopted by an uncle. Her father died in prison after he was arrested for harbouring a fugitive general of the defunct Romanian Royal Army (who was another of her uncles) for 11 years.

She graduated from the Mihai Eminescu Literary School in Bucharest, and worked for a while for the poetry section of Viața Românească while doing translations.

Her first husband was Marin Preda, to whom she was married between 1955 and 1959 (or 1960). She encouraged him to publish the novel Moromeții, whose manuscript she had found in a drawer.

Her fiancé in the mid-1960s, mathematician Tudor Ganea, did not succeed in getting her out of Romania, so she took her chance to defect to the West while she was at the poetry festival in Knokke-Het Zoute, Belgium. She settled down in Paris, France, where, being destitute, Pierre Emmanuel's wife paid her rent for several years. In Paris she befriended, among others, Romanian émigrés Mircea Eliade, Emil Cioran, and Jean Parvulesco.

Between 1967 and 1978 she was a collaborator of Monica Lovinescu and Virgil Ierunca in their literary radio program aired by Radio Free Europe.

While living in France, she married Aurel Cornea, a Romanian-born French television sound engineer, who was held hostage in Lebanon by the pro-Iranian Shiite Islamic group known as the Revolutionary Justice Organization for ten and a half months in 1986.

She paid construction costs for a church located in Cornu, Prahova County. Its design was inspired by a Horia Damian drawing.

In later years, she lived in Paris and New York City. Cornu died in a hospital in Paris on 14 March 2021, at the age of 89.

== Books ==
- Studenta (1954)
- Distanțe (1962)
- La Déesse au sourcil blanc (in French). Paris: Impr. Couteau. 1984. ISBN 2-9500570-0-4. OCLC 461687706.
- Poezii (in Romanian). București: Cartea Românească. 1995. ISBN 973-23-0471-5. OCLC 895631367.
- Romanian fugue in C sharp: a novel and nine stories. New York: iUniverse. 2003. ISBN 0-595-29368-9. OCLC 71312300.
- Marin Preda, Scrisori către Aurora (1998)

== Translations ==
- Hamlet, under the pseudonym Ștefan Runcu in: William Shakespeare, Romeo și Julieta. Hamlet, București: Editura pentru Literatură, 1962, OCLC 935349301.

== Filmography ==
Year	Title	Role	Notes
1970	Claire's Knee	Aurora, the novelist	
1972	Love in the Afternoon	Dream Sequence	(final film role)
1973	Bilocation		Director
