= Amanda Langlet =

French actress (born 1967)

Amanda Langlet (born 1967) is a French actress.

== Life ==
She began her career on television in Les 400 coups de Virginie in 1979, directed by Bernard Queysanne. A leading role in Éric Rohmer's Pauline at the Beach followed in 1983, Elsa, Elsa directed by Didier Haudepin in 1985, Rosette cherche une chambre in 1987 and Christian François's Sanguine in 1988. Again for Éric Rohmer, she played Margot in his A Summer's Tale (1996) and Janine in Triple Agent (2004). She has appeared in two films of Michel Deville: La Divine Poursuite in 1997 and La Maladie de Sachs in 1999. She played a nurse in Lucas Belvaux's Mère de Toxico. In 2008, she took the role of Maya in Christine Dory's Les Inséparables.
