= I Am the Ripper =

- DVD Cover
- Directed by: François Gaillard
- Written by: François Gaillard
- Starring: Nicholas Tary; Nicholas Verdoux; Fabien Félicité; Kim N'Guyen-Duy; Yann Joseph
- Cinematography: Raphaël Griot
- Edited by: François Gaillard
- Music by: Frédéric Gensse
- Distributed by: Freakannibal Pictures
- Release date: 17 May 2004
- Running time: 92 minutes
- Country: France
- Language: French

I Am the Ripper is a 2004 action horror documentary-style film directed by François Gaillard, under the pseudonym Eric Anderson.

== Plot ==
At a crowded apartment party, sultry goth-punk Raphaëlle is pawed by a male guest whom she kicks in the eye in response. When he goes to the bathroom to check his injury, he's attacked and murdered by a mysterious Death like figure in a cloak and skull mask. His body is discovered by a girl whom the killer promptly decapitates, tossing her head into the middle of the living room which throws the crowd into a panic. The stranger wades through the partygoers, skewering heads and slashing away until the guests have either fled or perished. Raphaëlle stays behind and challenges the killer to fight. Meanwhile, the rest of the survivors split up and run to find help, but somehow keep finding themselves back in the apartment. They find Raphaëlle and discover that she had been possessed and transformed into a hellish she-demon.

The slaughter continues as the killer hunts down the remaining survivors. They gain control of one of the killer's guns and start shooting, to no avail. One of the survivors, Peter, continues to search for Raphaëlle. Instead he finds the killer who is revealed to be Death. He gains control of the gun and another gunfight ensues. When the bullets run out, Death beats Peter and gives him a glimpse into Hell. Death decides to spare Peter's life for the moment, as Peter had been able to fight him off the longest. Death then proposes a challenge: a fight, with the winner keeping Peter's soul. Death gives Peter 24 hours to rest up and train for the fight and cautions him regarding the consequences should he try to cheat Death in any way. Peter decides to take his fate into his own hands, and puts a pistol to his head. What he sees next is all of his dead friends who take him to a club where the rules of the afterlife are explained to him. There is a small "entrance exam" given by their new employer, during which the candidate must take the life of someone he loved while he was alive. Peter's target is easily identified, and not wanting their "contracts cancelled" his friends tag along to ensure that all goes well. Joining them is another friend from the party who reveals that he is an angel, sent down as an arbiter for the events that come to pass when Death walks among the living.

== Cast ==
- Nicholas Tary - Peter
- Nicholas Verdoux - Nico
- Fabien Félicité - Sam
- Kim N'Guyen-Duy (credited as Kim N'Duy)
- Yann Joseph
- Alexandre Guégan
- Ulrich Waselinck
- Kae Nagakura
- Cécile Guérineau
- Ilona Patai
- Aurélie Godefroy
- Raphaël Griot
- Nichaolas Yepes
- Frédéric Lastaevel
- Gilles Landucci
- Michel Verger Laurent
- Lisa Nougier

== Reception ==
I Am the Ripper has received a negative critical reception.

A German review stated, " After a brief observation, the toenails of the normal gazer should certainly bend up. Autonomous people or the friends of the sub-genre mentioned could see it as an inspiring or creative contribution that is definitely something to be won over."

== Release ==
Released on Region 2 in Germany by Epix Entertainment in 4:3 full frame, with audio options of German Dolby Digital 2.0 & 5.1 and French Dolby Digital 2.0, optional German and English subtitles, the special features include: original trailer, photo gallery - video and promotion pictures, Epix-trailer show.

Released on Region 0 in the UK by Film 2000 on 24 May 2004. Another release was made in the UK by Redemption on 29 January 2007.
