= Cécile Decugis =

French film editor and film director

Cécile Decugis (May 15, 1930 – June 11, 2017) was a French film editor and director, known for her contributions to the French New Wave cinema. She worked on iconic films such as Breathless by Jean-Luc Godard and Shoot the Piano Player by François Truffaut. Decugis was also a longtime collaborator of director Éric Rohmer, editing nine of his feature films, including My Night at Maud’s.

== Early life and career ==
Cécile Régine Decugis was born in Marseille, France, on May 15, 1930. In the 1950s, she became involved with the Algerian independence movement and worked on several films related to the cause. One of her first directorial efforts was the 1957 short documentary Les Réfugiés, which depicted the plight of Algerian war refugees along the Algerian-Tunisian border.

Parallel to her activism, Decugis gained recognition as an editor, working on short films by François Truffaut and Jean-Luc Godard, two leading figures of the Nouvelle Vague. Her editing work on Breathless (1960) is considered groundbreaking for its innovative jump cuts, which became a signature style of the movement.

== Political involvement and imprisonment ==
On March 9, 1960, while working with Truffaut on Shoot the Piano Player, Decugis was arrested in Paris for having rented an apartment to a member of the Algerian National Liberation Front. She was sentenced to five years in prison and served two years at La Roquette prison. During this time, Truffaut provided her with financial support. She was released early due to good behavior.

== Collaboration with Éric Rohmer ==
Decugis became Éric Rohmer’s primary editor in the late 1960s, editing many of his most acclaimed films, including My Night at Maud’s (1969), Claire’s Knee (1970), and The Marquise of O (1976). Her precise and thoughtful editing style greatly contributed to the quiet, introspective atmosphere of Rohmer’s films.

== Later work and legacy ==
In addition to her work as an editor, Decugis directed a number of short and medium-length films. Her 2016 film, René ou le roman de mon père, was a personal documentary featuring family photos and reflections on her father, who died of tuberculosis at the age of 37. Decugis died in Boulogne-Billancourt, France, on June 11, 2017, at the age of 87.

After her death, her directorial work was screened at retrospectives at the Cinémathèque Française in 2017 and the Il Cinema Ritrovato festival in 2018.

== Selected filmography ==
=== As editor ===
- Les Mistons (1957) – dir. François Truffaut (short)
- Breathless (1960) – dir. Jean-Luc Godard
- Shoot the Piano Player (1960) – dir. François Truffaut
- My Night at Maud’s (1969) – dir. Éric Rohmer
- Claire’s Knee (1970) – dir. Éric Rohmer
- The Marquise of O (1976) – dir. Éric Rohmer
- Pauline at the Beach (1983) – dir. Éric Rohmer
- Full Moon in Paris (1984) – dir. Éric Rohmer

=== As director ===
- Les Réfugiés (1957) – Documentary short
- Le Passage (1965) – Medium-length film
- Italie aller retour (1984) – Medium-length film
- La Distribution de pain (2011) – Documentary
- René ou le roman de mon père (2016) – Documentary
