= Tana Kaleya =

Polish-German photographer and film director

Tana Kaleya (born 1939) is a Polish-German photographer and film director.

In 1983 she directed the erotic film Mujeres.

Her work is included in the collection of the Museum of Fine Arts Houston, and the Rijksmuseum Amsterdam.
