= Pauline at the Beach =

- Directed by: Éric Rohmer
- Written by: Éric Rohmer
- Produced by: Margaret Ménégoz
- Starring: Amanda Langlet
- Cinematography: Néstor Almendros
- Edited by: Cécile Decugis
- Release date: 23 March 1983
- Running time: 94 minutes
- Country: France
- Language: French

Pauline at the Beach (French: Pauline à la plage) is a 1983 French romantic comedy film directed by Éric Rohmer. The film stars Amanda Langlet, Arielle Dombasle, Pascal Greggory and Féodor Atkine. It is the third in the 1980s series Comedies and Proverbs by Rohmer.

== Plot ==
A car pulls up in front of a wooden gate. Teenaged Pauline (Amanda Langlet) gets out of the car to open the gate to allow her older divorcing cousin Marion (Arielle Dombasle) to drive into Marion’s brother’s vacation home grounds, in Jullouville, Manche, on the north-western coast of France. As the girls settle into their trip, Marion quizzes Pauline on her love life and Pauline confesses that she has not had any serious affairs of the heart.

On the beach, Marion spies her ex-lover Pierre (Pascal Greggory). As they are getting reacquainted, a man named Henri (Féodor Atkine) approaches and scolds Pierre for abandoning their windsurfing lessons. The quartet agree to have dinner together. Afterwards, they each talk briefly about their ideas of love in Henri's living room. Henri is happy to be free from any serious commitments, as he travels the world as an ethnographer. Marion wants to fall passionately in love at first sight and she regrets her failed marriage to a man that she did not really love. Pierre is more cautious and feels that love cannot form in an instant. Pauline listens quietly throughout and confesses that she agrees most of all with Pierre's idea of love but that she has learned a lot from listening to all of them.

Henri suggests that they go dancing at a nearby casino. At the casino, Pierre confesses that his love for Marion has been reignited by seeing her again. She does not want to resume a relationship with Pierre, due to his jealous nature. Instead, she chooses to sleep with Henri.

Back at the beach, Pierre tries to teach Marion and Pauline how to windsurf, when some local boys approach. Sylvain (Simon de la Brosse) takes a liking to Pauline. Marion steals away to visit Henri. Before they make love again, she prods him about the nature of his feelings, worried that she is just a meaningless conquest to him. Meanwhile, Sylvain and Pauline begin an affair of their own.

While Marion and Pauline are visiting Mont Saint-Michel, Henri does sleep with someone else, seducing Louisette (Rosette), who has a job selling snacks on the beach. Sylvain is watching TV downstairs at Henri's house, while Henri is upstairs with Louisette. Seeing Marion pull into the driveway, Sylvain goes upstairs to warn Henri. Louisette hides in the bathroom and Henri shoves Sylvain after her, closing the door on them as Marion climbs the stairs. Once Marion hears the pair in the bathroom, Henri opens the door and lets Sylvain and Louisette leave rapidly, explaining to Marion that he had caught the two in his bed making love.

As it happened, Pierre had been walking by and had chanced to see Louisette naked in Henri's bedroom. He warns Marion about Henri but she assures Pierre that it was Sylvain, not Henri, who was sleeping with Louisette. Pauline hears the false story about Sylvain and Louisette and is hurt but not heartbroken. Henri's lie unravels as those involved begin to compare stories. When Marion is called away for a brief meeting in Paris, Pauline learns the truth about Sylvain and she and Pierre go looking for him.

They run into Henri and Sylvain at a restaurant in Granville and they all return to Henri's house to make up over a glass of champagne. Henri apologizes for having caused everyone so much trouble. Pauline does not completely forgive Sylvain, not understanding why he didn't object to Henri's deceit. As they break up for the evening, Pierre and Sylvain get into a scuffle over Pauline, who decides to stay at Henri's, since Marion is still away. In the morning, Henri tries to seduce Pauline but she fends him off. He decides to leave on a two-week sailing trip and writes a farewell letter to Marion.

Back at their cottage, Marion reads Henri's letter; Pauline suggests that they cut short their vacation. Both have been disappointed in their love affairs. After they drive out of the gate, Marion turns off the car and says to Pauline that she is going to choose to believe that Henri did not sleep with Louisette, because believing otherwise would be too painful. She hints that Pauline can still honestly believe that Sylvain too did not sleep with Louisette. They agree to each maintain their own version of events and begin the drive back to Paris. The film closes with the same shot of the cottage gate it opened with.

== Cast ==
- Amanda Langlet as Pauline
- Arielle Dombasle as Marion
- Pascal Greggory as Pierre
- Féodor Atkine as Henri
- Simon de La Brosse as Sylvain
- Rosette as Louisette
- Marie Bouteloup as Marie (uncredited)
- Michel Ferry as Sylvain's friend (uncredited)

== Reception ==
=== Critical response ===
The film earned strong reviews when it was first released. Vincent Canby described it as "effortlessly witty" and "effervescent" in his New York Times review. He concluded, "I hope that Pauline at the Beach will win new admirers for Mr. Rohmer, one of the most original and elegant film makers at work today in any country....Mr. Rohmer's works could not exist in any other form. Their particular character would float off any printed page. They combine images, language, action and cinematic narrative fluidity to create a kind of cinema that no one else has ever done before. Pauline at the Beach is another rare Rohmer treat".

Referencing the Chrétien de Troyes quote that opens the film, "Qui trop parole, il se mesfait" ("A wagging tongue bites itself"), Pauline Kael wrote, "Pauline, who is the moral center of the film, doesn't carry tales. She listens to Marion deceiving herself and switching from one attitude to another as she tries to manipulate Henri. Pauline takes in what people say and what they do; she doesn't add to the talk with what she has heard". Review aggregation website Rotten Tomatoes retrospectively gave the film a score of 92% based on reviews collected from 13 critics.

=== Awards ===
Rohmer won the Silver Bear for Best Director at the 33rd Berlin International Film Festival. The film won the Boston Society of Film Critics 1983 Award for Best Screenplay. Rohmer won the Prix Méliès 1983.

== Legacy ==
Movies that recall Pauline at the Beach include: Frankie by Ira Sachs, Crustacés & Coquillages (Côte d'Azur) by Olivier Ducastel and Jacques Martineau, and Swimming Home by Justin Anderson.

Noah Baumbach originally wanted to title the film Margot at the Wedding as Nicole at the Beach, in reference to Pauline at the Beach. The title was changed when Nicole Kidman was cast.
