= L'Académie des neuf =

French television game show

- Presented by: Jean-Pierre Foucault
- Country of origin: France

Original release
- Network: Antenne 2
- Release: 15 March 1981 – December 2, 1984

L'Académie des neuf is a French game show presented Jean-Pierre Foucault broadcast from 1981 to 2015 on Antenne 2. It is based on the American gameshow Hollywood Squares.
