= My Night at Maud's =

- Theatrical release poster
- Directed by: Éric Rohmer
- Written by: Éric Rohmer
- Produced by: Barbet Schroeder; Pierre Cottrell
- Starring: Jean-Louis Trintignant; Françoise Fabian; Marie-Christine Barrault; Antoine Vitez
- Cinematography: Néstor Almendros
- Edited by: Cécile Decugis
- Production company: Les Films du Losange
- Distributed by: Compagnie Française de Distribution Cinématographique
- Release dates: 15 May 1969 (Cannes); 4 June 1969 (France)
- Running time: 110 minutes
- Country: France
- Language: French

My Night at Maud's (French: Ma nuit chez Maud), also known as My Night with Maud (UK), is a 1969 French New Wave drama film by Éric Rohmer. It is the third film (fourth in order of release) in his series of Six Moral Tales.

Over the Christmas break in the French city of Clermont-Ferrand, the film shows chance meetings and conversations between four single people, each knowing one of the other three. One man and one woman are Catholics, while the other man and woman are atheists. The discussions and actions of the four continually refer to the thoughts of Blaise Pascal (who was born in Clermont-Ferrand) on mathematics, on ethics, and on human existence. They also talk about a topic the bachelor Pascal did not cover – love between men and women.

== Plot ==
Jean-Louis, a solitary, serious Catholic engineer recently relocated by Michelin to Clermont-Ferrand, is certain he will marry a young blonde woman named Françoise who he has seen at church. At a bar, he runs into his old school-friend Vidal, an atheist Marxist who is now a philosophy professor. They discuss Pascal, and Vidal invites Jean-Louis to a performance by violinist Leonid Kogan that evening. Afterward, Vidal asks if they can get together the next day, which is Christmas Eve, but Jean-Louis is going to Midnight Mass. Vidal accepts an invitation to come along, and arranges for them to visit his friend Maud afterward, though the visit gets delayed a day, as she has to see her ex-husband, with whom she has a daughter. When Vidal mentions he and Maud were lovers, Jean-Louis offers to let Vidal go alone, but Vidal says they are incompatible as a couple, and he wants Jean-Louis to help make sure the visit remains platonic.

At Maud's apartment, Jean-Louis, Vidal, and the brunette, atheist pediatrician have a discussion about religion, Pascal, and Jean-Louis' relationship history. When it starts to snow, Maud, worried the drive to Jean-Louis' mountain village will be unsafe, offers her guest room. Vidal encourages Jean-Louis to stay and leaves.

Maud makes herself comfortable on her living-room bed. She mentions she and her husband both had affairs: he with a Catholic woman whom she despised, and she with a man who died in a car crash on icy roads. When Maud reveals there is no guest room and invites Jean-Louis to join her in bed, a shocked Jean-Louis fails to get comfortable in a chair before deciding to sleep under a blanket on top of Maude's bedspread. Early in the morning, they kiss, but Jean-Louis pulls away. Maud recovers quickly and, as he prepares to go, reminds him of a day trip to the mountains with Vidal and some others that afternoon.

On his way to meet up with Maud and her friends, Jean-Louis sees Françoise. He chases her down, and they arrange to have lunch after Mass the following day. In the mountains, Jean-Louis and Maud kiss, and she teases that she is not right for him, as she is neither Catholic, nor blonde. Back in town, they go shopping and make dinner together, and, before leaving, Jean-Louis says he thinks he has so quickly come to feel so happy around Maud because, as she is moving to Toulouse soon, "The thought of the future needn't depress us, since we have none." They part, smiling.

Jean-Louis sees Françoise and offers to drive her home. She is a biology postgraduate who also works at a lab, and, on the turnoff to her house, Jean-Louis gets stuck in the snow. Françoise offers to let him stay overnight in the room of one of her housemates, who all went home for the holiday, and they talk about relationships and choices over tea before retiring.

Before leaving for church in the morning, Françoise gently rejects Jean-Louis' attempt to kiss her. He says he loves her, but she says he does not know her, and might disappoint him. They begin to date, and Françoise admits that, until recently, she was having an affair with a married man whom, although she loves Jean-Louis, she has not forgotten. He says they can move slowly, and that he still loves her, and is even glad, as he felt guilty for having past affairs, but now they are even. Françoise asks that they never again discuss this subject.

On holiday five years later, Jean-Louis, now married to Françoise and with a son, sees Maud at the beach. Françoise and Maud, who know each other, exchange greetings as Françoise passes. Maud and Jean-Louis briefly reminisce, and she mentions she is in another unhappy marriage. Afterwards, Jean-Louis tells Françoise that Maud is the woman with whom he mentioned having spent the night just before they met, and is about to clarify that they did not have sex, when suddenly he realizes Françoise was the mistress of Maud's husband, and she is nervous Maud may have mentioned this. He does not broach the topic, she smiles, and they take their boy for a swim.

== Cast ==
- Jean-Louis Trintignant as Jean-Louis
- Françoise Fabian as Maud
- Marie-Christine Barrault as Françoise
- Antoine Vitez as Vidal
- Leonid Kogan as himself
- Guy Léger as the priest
- Anne Dubot as Vidal's blonde friend on the hike
- Marie Becker as Marie, Maud's daughter (uncredited)
- Marie-Claude Rauzier as a student (uncredited)

== Production ==
By 1967, Rohmer had the necessary funding for the third part of his Six Moral Tales cycle, My Night at Maud's, to be filmed in 35 mm. Because actor Jean-Louis Trintignant was not available at the time, however, filming had to be delayed, and the film was ultimately released after the fourth part of the cycle, La Collectionneuse. My Night at Maud's was produced by Les Films du Losange, the production company of Rohmer and Barbet Schroeder.

== Themes ==
One of the main themes in the film concerns Pascal's Wager, which Jean-Louis and Vidal discuss. The conversations are directly inspired by a 1965 episode of the television series En profil dans le texte directed by Rohmer titled "l'Entretien sur Pascal" (The interview on Pascal), which included a similar debate between Brice Parain and Dominican Father Dominique Dubarle. Rohmer would again explore themes of Pascal (and other writers) in his 1992 film A Tale of Winter.

== Release ==
The film premiered at the 1969 Cannes Film Festival, where it was shown in competition, and was released in French cinemas on 4 June the same year.

My Night at Maud's was released in the U.S. in 1970 and was nominated for two Academy Awards. Due to its influence, Chanturgue, a wine that is the subject of a discussion in Maud's apartment, exploded in popularity, becoming one of the best-selling imported wines by 1971.

== Reception ==
=== Critical response ===
When the film was released in France in 1969, it received mixed reviews. Guy Teisseire of L'Aurore wrote that "the best compliment we can pay Éric Rohmer is to have done with My Night at Maud's a talking film. I mean the opposite of a talkative film where the text would be used to fill the gaps: that is to say, a work in which eloquent silences are felt as lack of understanding about both is constant". Claude Garson of L'Aurore said that "we do not underestimate the ambition of such a work, but we say right away that film, with its own laws, does not lend itself to such a subject. The theater, or the conference would have better served the purpose of the authors, because such controversies have nothing photogenic, apart from the presence of the beautiful Françoise Fabian and that very good actor Jean-Louis Trintignant". Henry Chapier of Combat called the film "a bit stiff and intellectual". Jean Rochereau of La Croix called it "a masterpiece ... whose superb insolence toward everyone excites me and fills me". Jean de Baroncelli of Le Monde wrote that "it is a work that demands from the viewer a minimum of attention and complicity. We find ourselves on the fringes of worries and obsessions of the time: its commitment goes beyond the everyday. Yet this is, in our view, worth the price. ... We are grateful to Eric Rohmer for his haughty, if a little outdated, austerity. The interpretation is brilliant". Penelope Houston wrote that "this is a calm, gravely ironic, finely balanced film, an exceptionally graceful bit of screen architecture whose elegant proportioning is the more alluring because its symmetry doesn't instantly hit the eye".

My Night at Maud's was Rohmer's first successful film, both commercially and critically. It was screened and highly praised at the 1969 Cannes Film Festival. It was released in the US and praised by critics there as well. James Monaco said that "here, for the first time the focus is clearly set on the ethical and existential question of choice. If it isn't clear within Maud who actually is making the wager and whether or not they win or lose, that only enlarges the idea of "le pari" ("the bet") into the encompassing metaphor that Rohmer wants for the entire series". The film's arthouse theater release in the US was so successful that it got a wider release in regular theaters.

On the review aggregator website Rotten Tomatoes, 96% of 23 critics' reviews of My Night at Maud's are positive.

=== Awards and nominations ===
My Night at Maud's received the 1969 Prix Méliès and the 1970 Prix Max Ophüls, and was given the award for Best Screenplay by both the New York Film Critics Circle and the National Society of Film Critics in 1970. It was nominated for two Academy Awards: Best Foreign Language Film in 1970, and Best Original Screenplay in 1971.
