= Louis Lumière / conversation avec Langlois et Renoir =

- Directed by: Éric Rohmer
- Starring: Jean Renoir; Henri Langlois
- Cinematography: Jacques Lacourie
- Edited by: Muriel Bardot
- Release date: 1968
- Running time: 66 min.
- Country: France
- Language: French

Louis Lumière is a 66-minute filmed conversation between Henri Langlois, founder and director of the Cinémathèque Française, and the film director Jean Renoir. It was directed by Éric Rohmer in 1968.
