= Katerina Didaskalou =

Greek actress

- Κατερίνα Διδασκάλου
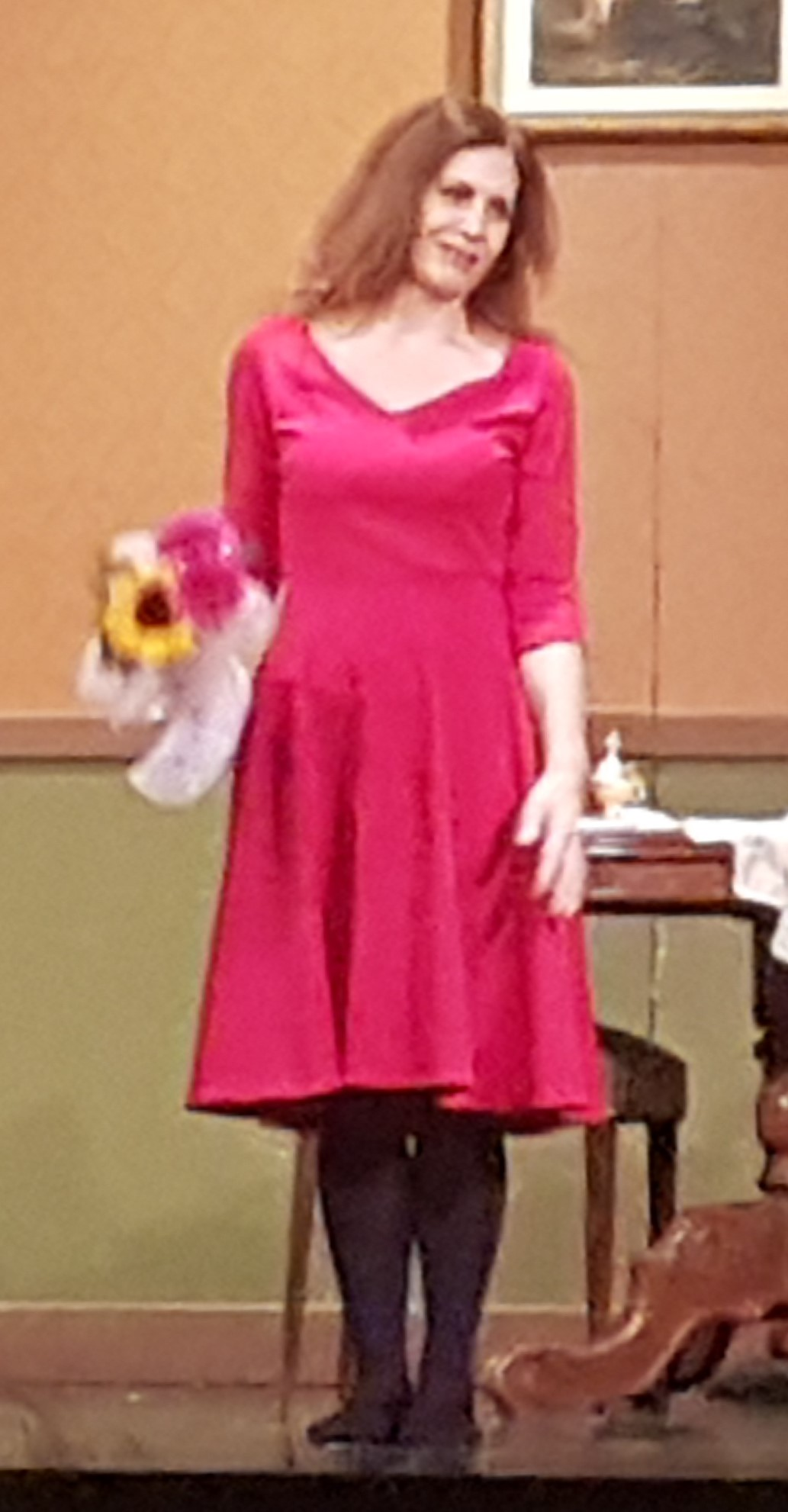
- Katerina Didaskalou April 2022
- Born: 30 September 1960 Athens, Greece
- Years active: 1991-present

Katerina Didaskalou (Greek: Κατερίνα Διδασκάλου) (born 30 September 1960 in Athens, Greece) is a Greek theatre, stage, television and film actress. She studied dramatic arts and philosophy in Athens and went on to study cinema and theater at Columbia University, on an Onassis Foundation scholarship. In 2005, she starred in Eric Rohmer's Triple Agent, as "Arsinoe", the Greek wife of a retired general of the Tsarist army. She was in the 1st and 4th seasons of the Greek soap opera Erotas ("Love"), and in the US-produced film Captain Corelli's Mandolin.
