= A Tale of Springtime =

1990 film by Éric Rohmer

- Theatrical release poster
- French: Conte de printemps
- Directed by: Éric Rohmer
- Written by: Éric Rohmer
- Produced by: Margaret Ménégoz
- Starring: Anne Teyssèdre; Hugues Quester; Florence Darel
- Cinematography: Luc Pagès
- Edited by: María Luisa García
- Music by: Jean-Louis Valero
- Production companies: Les Films du Losange; Compagnie Éric Rohmer
- Distributed by: Les Films du Losange
- Release dates: 20 February 1990 (Berlin); 4 April 1990 (France)
- Running time: 112 minutes
- Country: France
- Language: French

A Tale of Springtime (French: Conte de printemps) is a 1990 French comedy-drama film written and directed by Éric Rohmer, starring Anne Teyssèdre, Hugues Quester and Florence Darel. It is the first instalment in Rohmer's "Contes des quatre saisons" ("Tales of the Four Seasons") series, which also includes A Tale of Winter (1992), A Summer's Tale (1996) and Autumn Tale (1998).

== Plot ==
Jeanne, a young philosophy teacher, cannot go home to her flat in Paris because her cousin Gaëlle is having a rendezvous with her boyfriend Gildas, who is in the military. It is not any better at her own boyfriend's apartment which was left in poor condition (apart from some fresh flowers in a vase) and she decides to leave and go to a housewarming party where she meets Natacha, a younger student who studies music. They become friends quickly, whereupon Natacha invites Jeanne to her home to stay with her. She lets Jeanne use the father's bedroom as he is always at his young girlfriend's home. However, the father, Igor, stops by the next morning to pick up some clothes, and is surprised by Jeanne, who has just returned from a shower in an awkward moment.

When the father leaves, the two new friends discuss a trip to Natacha's family's country house in Fontainebleau. Natacha, who dislikes her father's girlfriend Ève, probes Jeanne about her perceptions of her father thinking there could be a potential relationship to cultivate. She discreetly sets up a scenario that has Igor, Ève and Jeanne all at the country house at the same time. Over dinner, Jeanne discovers that Ève has a similar academic background in philosophy. Feeling left out of the conversation, Natacha becomes angry and insulting when Ève tries to engage her in the discussion. The argument escalates and Ève decides to leave the cottage abruptly. Jeanne offers to leave instead, but it appears Igor and Ève's relationship was becoming strained before the visit and Ève leaves, possibly for good.

The next day, Natacha's boyfriend from Paris, William, suddenly visits and they abruptly and awkwardly leave Igor and Jeanne alone for the day. Not knowing what to do, and knowing Natacha attempted to set them up together, the two read in the garden and stay distant. Being polite, Igor offers afternoon tea inside the home. Both the father and Jeanne agree that they have been set up and briefly discuss the possibilities of a relationship—Igor admitting Ève was a fling and not important. At the end of a quick kiss, Jeanne decides that the entire family relationship was going too far and departs back to Paris to pack up her things. It is becoming clear that Jeanne would just be in the same predicament as Ève over time.

Natacha comes into the apartment looking for Jeanne and is clearly disappointed that things did not work out according to plan. Jeanne returns to her flat and finds fresh flowers as a gift from Gaëlle. She goes to her boyfriend's flat, presumably to resume their relationship and finds the vase of flowers wilted and dead. Jeanne then places the gifted flowers on the table.

== Cast ==
- Anne Teyssèdre as Jeanne
- Hugues Quester as Igor
- Florence Darel as Natacha
- Eloïse Bennett as Ève
- Sophie Robin as Gaëlle
- Marc Lelou as Gildas
- François Lamore as William

== Themes ==
Like most Rohmer films, A Tale of Springtime explores human intellectual relationships with long dialogues and precisely placed settings. The thematic use of spring and its renewal cycle is visually presented from the orderly, colder Paris home to the warm, bucolic country residence. Natacha's father complex and his propensity for cycling through younger women is also embedded as a seasonal theme. Jeanne, through acute observation of the family dynamic and listening to Igor's comments about Ève, clearly realizes that she would just be another part of the new-to-old cycle goes back to renew her relationship with her own boyfriend with fresh new flowers.
