= Les Jeux de société =

Les Jeux de société is a 1989 film by Éric Rohmer, starring Alexandra Stewart. The length is 57 min.
