= Triple Agent =

2004 film by Éric Rohmer

- Theatrical release poster
- Directed by: Éric Rohmer
- Written by: Éric Rohmer
- Produced by: Françoise Etchegaray; Philippe Liégeois; Jean-Michel Rey
- Starring: Katerina Didaskalou; Serge Renko; Cyrielle Clair; Amanda Langlet; Emmanuel Salinger; Grigori Manoukov
- Cinematography: Diane Baratier
- Edited by: Mary Stephen
- Production companies: Rezo Productions; Compagnie Éric Rohmer; France 2 Cinéma; BIM Distribuzione; Alta Producción; Tornasol Films; Strada Productions; Mentor Cinema
- Distributed by: Rezo Films (France); Playtime S.A. (Greece); BIM Distribuzione (Italy)
- Release dates: 13 February 2004 (Berlin); 17 March 2004 (France); 1 October 2004 (Greece); 1 June 2005 (Italy)
- Running time: 115 minutes
- Countries: France; Spain; Italy; Russia; Greece
- Languages: French; Russian; German; Greek

Triple Agent is a 2004 spy thriller film written and directed by Éric Rohmer and starring Katerina Didaskalou and Serge Renko. The film is based on the true story of White Russian general (and secret Soviet agent) Nikolai Skoblin and his involvement in the disappearance and murder of fellow White Russian general Evgenii Miller.

== Plot ==
The Popular Front wins the French general elections of 1936. In Spain, the Civil War begins. Meanwhile, in a Parisian apartment, Fiodor Voronin, a retired general of the White Russian Army, lives an apparently quiet life with his Greek wife, Arsinoé. Fiodor is a deputy at the White Russian Military Union, and he is slated to replace the aging General Dobrinsky soon.

Unbeknownst to his wife and colleagues, he is also a Soviet agent. When Dobrinsky disappears, Voronin is considered a suspect and vanishes without a trace. His wife is tried by the French government, and her reputation is ruined. During the German occupation of Paris, the Gestapo discover that it is likely that Voronin was murdered by the NKVD after having been smuggled from the Soviet embassy to the Spanish Second Republic.

== Cast ==
- Katerina Didaskalou as Arsinoé
- Serge Renko as Fiodor Voronin
- Cyrielle Clair as Maguy
- Grigori Manoukov as Boris
- Dimitri Rafalsky as General Dobrinsky
- Nathalia Krougly as general
- Amanda Langlet as Janine
- Emmanuel Salinger as André
- Vitaliy Cheremet as Alexis Tcherepnine
- Jeanne Rambur as Dany
- Bernard Peysson as doctor
- Laurent Le Doyen as journalist
- Émilie Fourrier as seamstress helper
- Alexandre Koltchak as Planton
- Vladimir Léon as Chernov
- Alexandre Tcherkassoff as Admiral Galinine
- Alexandre Koumpan as General Melinski
- Jorg Schnass as German police officer
- Georges Benoît as French commissioner

== Analysis ==
A convoluted plot is seen that acts as a history lesson in the years of the Popular Front and World War II. Fiodor Voronin (Serge Renko), a former general in the White Russian army, acts as a double agent between the Soviets and the Nazi secret police. The entire movie is shaped through a common theme of "the opaqueness of human motivations", ultimately creating a "flawed interpretation of evidence" in creating a love triangle. The secrecy of Fiodor presents an interesting theme that runs its course throughout the entire film. This very secrecy is meant to allow the audience to think and ponder on what exactly is happening. Rohmer claims, "It's good for there to be no clear solutions to the questions being posed. It's much more interesting."

Furthermore, Rohmer uses "cruel moral dilemmas, sophisticated settings and the use of language as the main constituent in the drama." Renko plays Fiodor as someone who had a triple life between various spy organizations. He is portrayed as bland, but that is the very essence of his character, as he must be bland.

Additionally, Didaskalou presents a hesitant character who portrays an ill woman secondary to the overall plot. Both characters play into how the movie flows and what the overarching theme of it is, presenting scenes full of character engagement and conversation.

History represents an incredibly important aspect of the film, as the conversations that Fiodor has between the other characters always seem to mention the Spanish Civil War, the Popular Front and notions of communism. Arsinoé describes the genre as "to paint people in their natural environment".

The New York Times describes the film as "a story of a cheating husband concealing his secret life, a wife who swallows her suspicions until she can't hold them in any longer, the husband's dubious contrition and a melodramatic denouement." Furthermore, a convoluted, intricate movie, full of issues presented in character development, is created. From these sources there is a fundamental breakdown between the audience, the characters and the overall movement of the play. The characters are seen interacting in a historical setting conveying what exactly was going on in the world at that time. Between the Spanish Civil War, the growth of fascism and communism, and the Popular Front gaining power in France, many international issues are brought to light. The language and interaction of the characters have long dialogues and secrecy and further convey that Fiodor is indeed a secret agent.

Ultimately, each character plays an important, subtle aspect to convey specific messages of betrayal, love and an entangled, convoluted plot.

== Historical context ==
Triple Agent is centered around a multitude of issues that the world was facing. The Spanish Civil War in 1936, the Popular Front gaining momentum and power in France, and the ultimate rise and power of fascism and communism. Each presented an incredible problem as the world moved towards a second world war.

The Spanish Civil War was fought from 1936 to 1939 between the nationalists backed by Fascist Italy and Nazi Germany, composed mostly of Roman Catholics against the Republicans, a front of liberals, communists, anarchists, socialists, agricultural laborers, workers and the educated middle class. The war begun after General Franco made a coup d'état against the elected government. The nationalists were headed by General Francisco Franco, while the republicans by the socialist leader, Francisco Largo Caballero. Both sides sought help from abroad: the republicans gained equipment and supplies from the Soviets, while also receiving help from Mexico and the Popular Front of France. The nationalists gained troops, tanks, and planes from Germany and Italy. Ultimately, the nationalists won as they took over Madrid on 28 March 1939. Many have estimated the deaths to be anywhere from 500,000 to 1,000,000, as this proved to be a testing group for future air and tank warfare. The war also further sprung strong points of view in terms of tyranny, democracy, fascism, and communism leading to World War II.

The Popular Front in France sought to defend democratic forms against the newly fascist regime. This was a coalition between the working class and middle class all to protect the country from fascist ideals. In 1936, a socialist popular front led by Léon Blum took over Furthermore, fascism and communism were gaining followers and momentum by the day. In Germany, there was Adolf Hitler, in Italy there was Benito Mussolini, in Spain there was Francisco Franco, in the Soviet Union there was Joseph Stalin and in Japan, many ideologies were used to create a powerful military. The rise of fascism gave countries like Germany and Italy a foundation for rebuilding and a way for them to blame their problems on minorities such as jews, Slavs and Gipsies. Communism was able to promise people an opportunity, overhauling capitalism into their society. Ultimately these powerful leaders were able to instill ideologies into society in order to create extremely repressive, brutal regimes. This created a great threat to the world ultimately beginning World War II.

== Reception ==
Initially, critics were extremely skeptical about Triple Agent because of Rohmer's earlier film, The Lady and the Duke (2001). French critics had hated The Lady and the Duke because it portrayed the French revolutionaries in a negative light instead of as a movement for justice; they had found it slow and irritating and so were expecting another Rohmer film to be "like watching paint dry". However, Triple Agent was extremely well received by critics in France. Ultimately, Rohmer has been known for challenging the conventional in a beautiful and elegant manner.
