= Verdelot, Seine-et-Marne =

Verdelot
- Commune
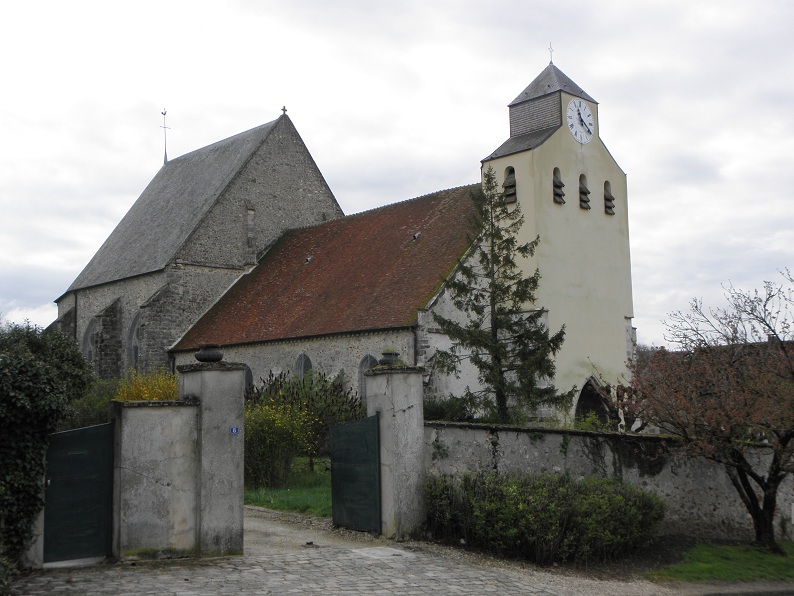
- The church in Verdelot
- Location of Verdelot
- Location within France Location within Île-de-France (region)
- Coordinates: 48°52′32″N 3°22′05″E
- Country: France
- Region: Île-de-France
- Department: Seine-et-Marne
- Arrondissement: Provins
- Canton: Coulommiers

Government
  - Mayor (2020–2026): André Parruitte
- Area^{1}: 25.60 km^{2} (9.88 sq mi)
- Highest elevation: 216 m (709 ft)
- Lowest elevation: 91 m (299 ft)
- Population (2023): 620
  - Density: 24/km^{2} (63/sq mi)
- Time zone: UTC+01:00 (CET)
  - Summer (DST): UTC+02:00 (CEST)
- INSEE/Postal code: 77492 /77510
- ^{1} French Land Register data, which excludes lakes, ponds, glaciers > 1 km^{2} (0.386 sq mi or 247 acres) and river estuaries.

Verdelot (French pronunciation: [vɛʁdəlo]) is a French commune located in the Seine-et-Marne département, in the Île-de-France région.

== Demographics ==
Inhabitants of Verdelot are called Verdelotais. As of 2023, the population of the commune was 620.

== See also ==
- Communes of the Seine-et-Marne department
