= Dominique Dubarle =

French Dominican friar and religious philosopher

Dominique Dubarle (23 September 1907 – 25 April 1987) was a French Dominican friar and religious philosopher, a professor at the Saulchoir. He was dean of the faculty of philosophy of the Catholic Institute of Paris from 1967 to 1973 and was an expert at the Second Vatican Council.

== Life ==
Dubarle was born in the village of Biviers in Isère and later educated at the Collège Stanislas de Paris. The college chaplain, Father Beaussart, a future auxiliary bishop of Paris, helped to inspire his religious vocation, which was also influenced by his friendship with a fellow student, Jean Riondet, who died in 1929 before he could join the Dominicans. Dubarle was ordained in 1931, graduated as a doctor of philosophy and theology in 1933, and in 1944 was appointed as professor of philosophy at the Catholic Institute, Paris.

Trained in mathematical logic and the epistemology of science, Dubarle later worked along a path traced by Aristotle and Thomas Aquinas, on ontology, engaging in dialogue with Hegelian thought, while reflecting on the challenges of contemporary culture. His thought was of great depth, and he fundamentally rethought the links between truth and philosophical action, metaphysics and freedom, and theology and philosophy.

Dubarle later collaborated with Louis Leprince-Ringuet to solve problems in nuclear physics and in 1948 contributed an article to Le Monde which helped to make cybernetics better known in France.

In 1964, Dubarle participated in the Week of Marxist thought and published ”For a dialogue with Marxism”.

He was the brother of André-Marie Dubarle (1910–2002), also a Dominican and a professor at the Saulchoir.

Dubarle died on 25 April 1987.

== Selected works ==
- ”Le dernier écrit philosophique de Jean Cavaillès” in Revue de métaphysique et de morale, LIII, no. 3 (Société française de philosophie, Paris, 1948)
- “Idées scientifiques actuelles et domination des faits humains”, in Esprit 9, 18 (1950), pp. 296–317
- La civilisation et l'atome (1964)
- Humanisme scientifique et raison chrétienne (1964)
- Pour un dialogue avec le marxisme (1964)
- Approche d'une théologie de la science (1967)
- “Essai sur l' ontologie théologale de saint Augustin” in les Recherches Augustiniennes XVI (1981), pp. 197–288
- L'ontologie de Thomas d'Aquin (1996)

== In popular culture ==
In Éric Rohmer's film My Night at Maud's (1969), conversations about Pascal's wager are directly inspired by the television show Talk on Pascal (Entretien sur Pascal, 1965), also made by Rohmer, including a similar debate between Dominique Dubarle and Brice Parain.
