= A Summer's Tale =

1996 French romantic comedy film by Éric Rohmer

- Theatrical release poster
- French: Conte d'été
- Directed by: Éric Rohmer
- Written by: Éric Rohmer
- Produced by: Margaret Ménégoz
- Starring: Amanda Langlet; Melvil Poupaud; Aurélia Nolin; Gwenaëlle Simon
- Cinematography: Diane Baratier
- Edited by: Mary Stephen
- Music by: Philippe Eidel; Sébastien Erms
- Production companies: Les Films du Losange; La Sept Cinéma
- Distributed by: Les Films du Losange
- Release date: 5 June 1996 (France)
- Running time: 113 minutes
- Country: France
- Language: French
- Box office: $198,126 (United States only)

A Summer's Tale (French: Conte D'Été) is a 1996 French romantic comedy film written and directed by Éric Rohmer. It is the third film in his Contes des quatre saisons (Tales of the Four Seasons) series, after A Tale of Springtime (1990) and A Tale of Winter (1992) and before Autumn Tale (1998). A Summer's Tale stars Amanda Langlet, Melvil Poupaud, Aurélia Nolin, and Gwenaëlle Simon.

The plot is loosely based on Rohmer's experiences and relationships as a young film student.

The film was screened in the Un Certain Regard section at the 1996 Cannes Film Festival.

== Plot ==
Gaspard, a mathematics graduate and musician, arrives alone in the seaside town of Dinard. He spends his time in his friend's empty flat composing music, going to the beach, and walking around town. He meets waitress Margot in a crêpe restaurant. They soon become friends and meet daily to walk and talk. Margot has a PhD in ethnology, and conducts research interviews with local Bretons in her spare time. Gaspard has an on again/off again girlfriend, Léna, who said she would visit him in Dinard. Margot has a long-distance boyfriend. Gaspard speaks of his confused relationship with Léna while Margot offers advice. Gaspard clumsily tries to kiss Margot, and she lightheartedly fends him off. Margot takes Gaspard on a research trip to a local fisherman's house to discuss maritime folk songs. Inspired by the visit, Gaspard writes his own sea shanty, a diversion from his typical blues music.

Gaspard joins Margot's friends for a night of dancing at a local disco, where he feels out of place. One of Margot's friends, Solène, notices him and happens to run into him alone at the beach the next weekend. She invites him to go sailing on her uncle's boat and the pair bond over the sea shanty he has written. Her attraction to him and his musical talent boosts his low self-esteem. Solène, who just broke up with two suitors herself, has rigid ideas about commitment and the romantic process and Gaspard falls in line as she becomes his most promising option. They decide to take a trip to Ouessant, an island off the tip of Brittany, the next week.

By chance, Léna finds Gaspard at the beach and appears genuinely excited to see him after the long delay. Gaspard, who has been flummoxed by Léna's standoffish behavior in the past, is delighted at her renewed interest in him and decides to visit Ouessant with her rather than Solène. Gaspard and Margot talk about his growing dilemma. She questions his tendency to go along with whichever girl he happens to be with at the time and wonders whether he is cunning and manipulative or simply a weak fool. His inability to commit to a choice leads Gaspard into double-booking the trip with both Léna and Solène.

Later, Léna says she is not in love with Gaspard and departs in anger. It appears to Gaspard that his only option is Solène, but on a walk with Margot, he again kisses her and this time it is reciprocated. Tired of Léna's moods and Solène's pressure, Gaspard then tells Margot he wants to visit Ouessant with her because their relationship is more honest and caring.

Léna calls Gaspard at home, apologizing for her behavior and reinviting herself to Ouessant. Solène also calls, committing to the trip and hanging up before Gaspard can respond. Gaspard has now told all three women he will take them to Ouessant. Then a friend calls to inform him of a man in La Rochelle who wants to sell Gaspard some recording equipment the next morning. Gaspard decides to leave town and stand up both Léna and Solène.

Gaspard asks Margot to meet him at the ferry to Saint Malo, where he explains the situation. Margot then tells Gaspard that her boyfriend is imminently returning, and that they will go to Ouessant. Gaspard is surprised at the news, assuming that Margot would always be there for him, and they make vague plans to meet in future. As they walk down the ramp to the boat, they say goodbye and kiss passionately. Margot waves as the boat pulls out. As it sails off, the sea shanty "Santiano" plays.

== Cast ==
- Amanda Langlet as Margot
- Melvil Poupaud as Gaspard
- Aurelia Nolin as Léna
- Gwenaëlle Simon as Solène
- Aimé Lefèvre as the Newfoundlander
- Alain Guellaff as Uncle Alain
- Evelyne Lahana as Aunt Maiwen
- Yves Guérin as accordionist
- Franck Cabot as cousin

== Themes ==
A Summer's Tale is considered one of Rohmer's more conventional films due to its autobiographical nature. Rohmer's use of a male protagonist is something of a departure from his earlier films, and is thought to be evidence that he put many of his own ideas into Gaspard's mouth during his discussions with Margot. The film's youthful characters obsess over their self-image and group dynamics and the overarching theme is how romantic relationships define self-image and self-worth. Gaspard sees Léna as a better business decision even though she is a "moody, imperious beauty who calls the shots and tells him that in the opinion of her cousins, he doesn't measure up". Solène, self-assured and straightforward, pursues Gaspard, whom she sees as a moody, mysterious artist, and Léna, when she suddenly appears, is profoundly dissatisfied that Gaspard is her best option. The most confident of the four characters, Margot, seems to be patiently waiting for Gaspard to find himself. Margot and Gaspard develop a strong bond while he is waiting for Léna, so when Margot introduces him to Solène, it was potentially to "smother the fragility of this relationship".

The filming is mostly on the tourist beaches, except when Margot extracts Gaspard for excursions out of his comfort zone. Their long walks and conversations lead them outside the tourist areas and into the countryside. Gaspard is conscious of his own isolation, and confides his dislike of groups to Margot. The first seven minutes of the film have no dialogue, a record for Rohmer's films, surpassing even the five minutes of initial silence in A Tale of Springtime. The film's beginning follows Gaspard's silent, solitary wanderings on his first day in town, and he makes excuses to be alone throughout the film. Gaspard sees this as a protest against superficiality, but it may just be a way for him to protect himself. New York Times reviewer Stephen Holden speculated that Gaspard has social anxiety disorder.

Time plays an important role in the film: title cards show the date each day from 17 July to 6 August. Gaspard tracks how many days late Léna is while walking with Margot and scanning the beaches for her. Characteristically of Rohmer's films, time is shown linearly. Gaspard is shown to be extremely conscious of time constraints: he has a date on which he must leave for his new job in Nantes and gets upset at Léna for going on an unplanned trip to Jersey with her cousins on the grounds that it leaves them with too little time to visit Ouessant together. Waiting, especially for those with whom one has a relationship with, is also a theme of the film. Gaspard is waiting for Léna to arrive, and after she unexpectedly does, he waits for her to return from her family trip to Jersey. Solène also waits, for Gaspard to decide to go to Ouessant with her, oblivious to the promises he made to the other women. Margot describes herself as waiting "like a sailor's wife" for her boyfriend across the world. But her boyfriend's existence is kept ambiguous; he may be only a way for Margot to save face.

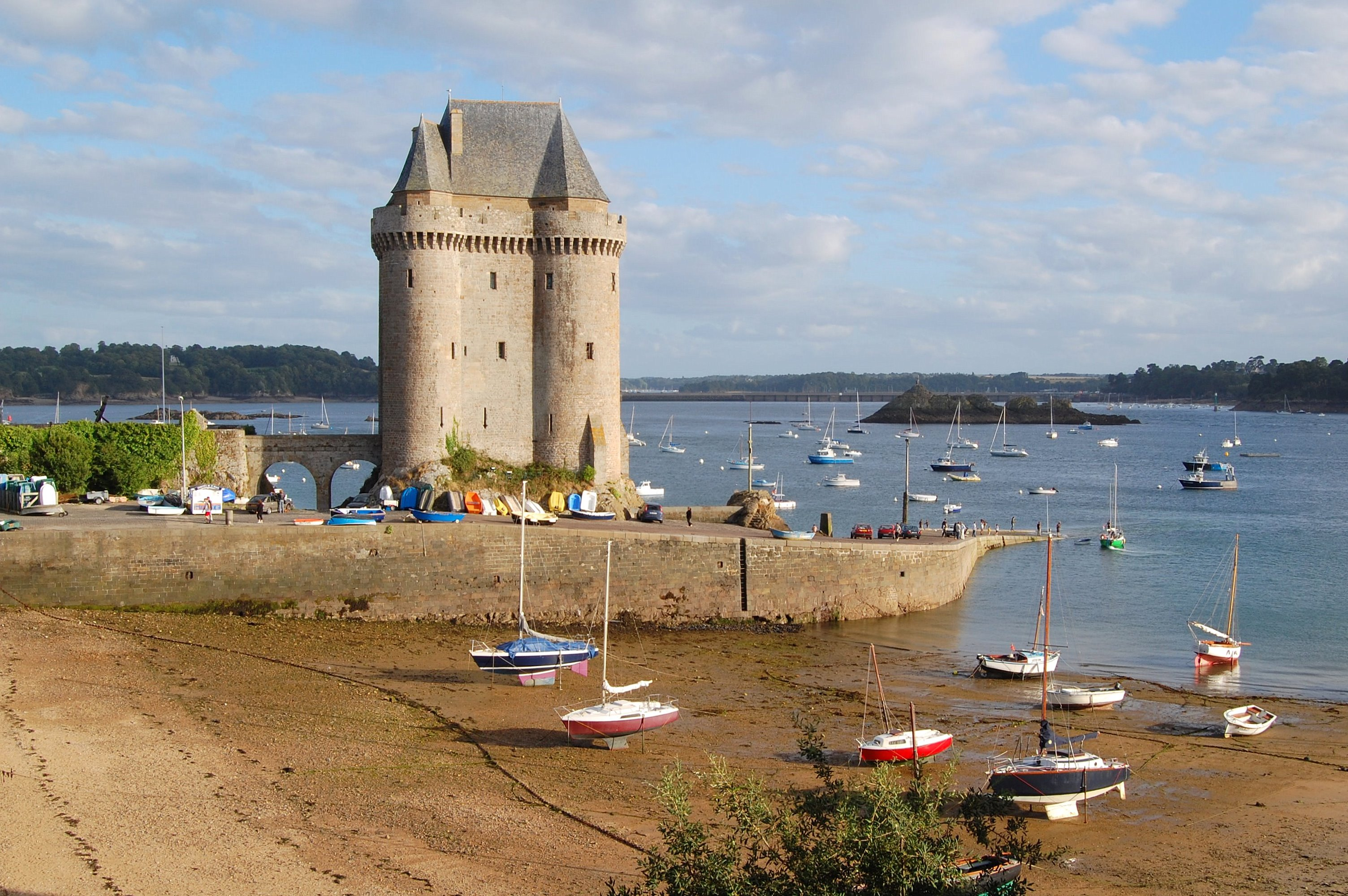
Margot and Gaspard bond a shared appreciation of their surroundings, such as the Solidor Tower

Place is also important in the film. A strong sense of place is a common theme of Rohmer's Tales of the Four Seasons, and the characters' movements are clearly signposted. The names of cafes, nightclubs, and towns are clear in the cinematography and dialogue. We learn that Gaspard is from Rennes and that he is about to take a job with a design firm in Nantes. Margot is from Saint-Brieuc, an hour west of Dinard. On their walks, Margot takes pleasure in showing Gaspard around the area she knows so well, such as towns, islands, and landmarks such as the Solidor Tower, across the Rance river. Margot is the most mobile of Gaspard's love interests: she drives him to neighboring Saint-Lunaire and is the only one of the three women who "wanders onto all three of these stages", as she is seen in locations closely associated with Léna and Solène, while the reverse does not occur.

Rohmer's films have been noted to have a circular structure. Crisp writes that his films have "an extensive central element constituting a 'digression' or hole in time through which the temptation of the temporal intrudes. The digression will seem to promise escape from a trap which the protagonist feels closing around him or her, but will come to be seen rather as itself a trap from which the protagonist must escape." In A Summer's Tale, Gaspard departs the town at the end of the film the same way in which he arrived, via the ferry. His holiday fills a gap before his new career begins. And the commitments he made to the three women ends with him caught in a trap: he must choose one and disappoint two others. His friend's call allows him to escape this trap he has created, albeit less than honorably.

Other typically Rohmerian themes include self-deception and coincidence, especially applied to a protagonist who does something unexpected while waiting for someone else and then has to make a difficult choice. Gaspard came to Dinard to wait for Léna but develops a friendship with Margot and a romance with Solène. When Léna unexpectedly appears, Gaspard is caught in a trap of his own making. To Solène, Gaspard downplays his relationship with Léna. When Solène or Léna shows him kindness, Gaspard effusively praises them to Margot. And when they fight, Gaspard becomes extremely pessimistic about their prospects. Margot says she does not understand Gaspard: is he passively trying to keep his romantic interests by pleasing them, or is he a cunning game-player? Is he deceiving the women or himself? And who is the substitute for whom? The answers to these questions are left open. The dialogue, written by Rohmer, shows "a complicated mixture of innocence, impulsiveness and calculation".

== Filming ==
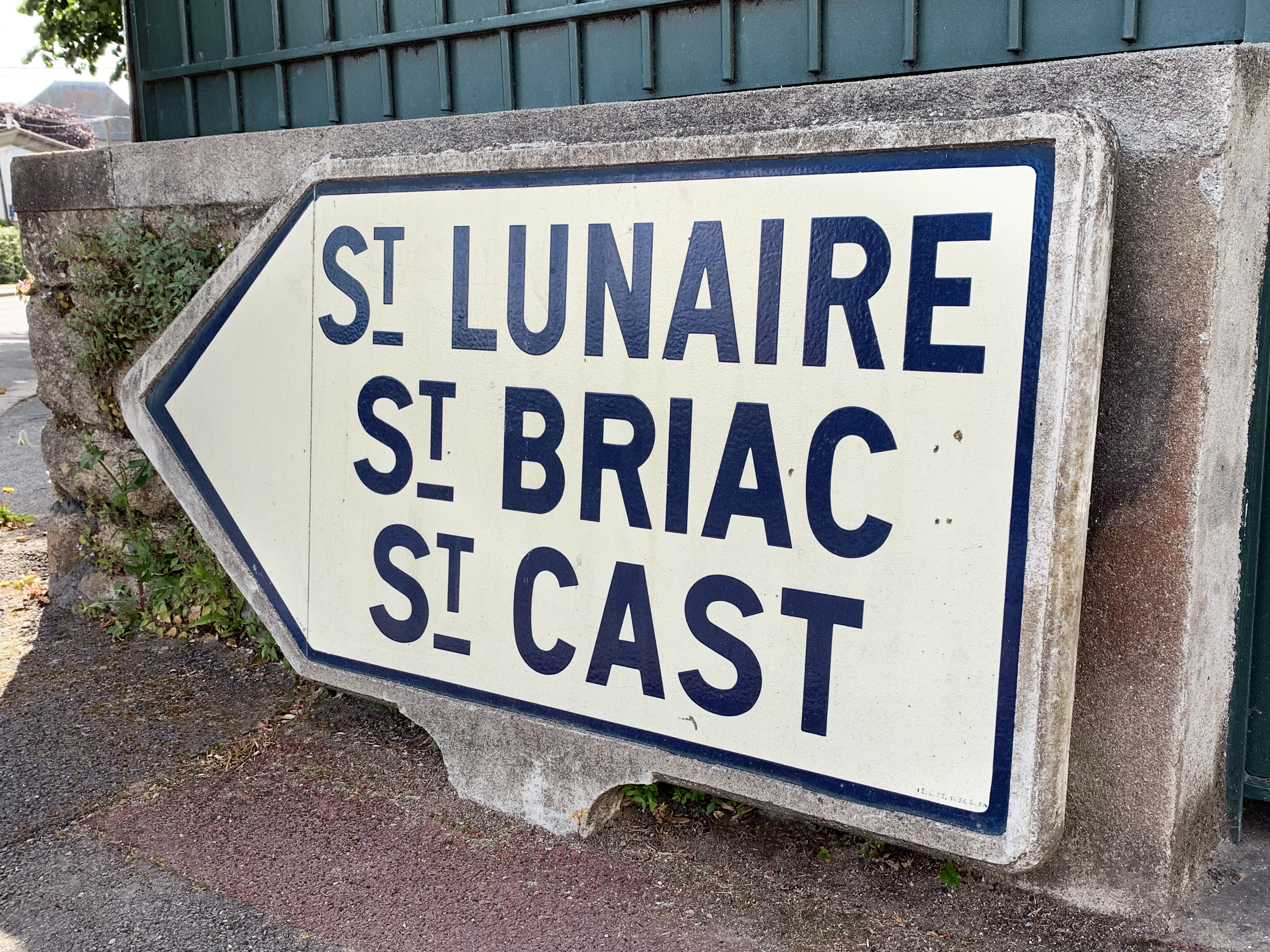
Sign for Saint-Lunaire in Dinard

The film was shot on location in the seaside towns of Dinard, Saint-Malo, and Saint-Lunaire, early in the summer of 1995 to avoid the tourists. Melvil Poupaud recalled Rohmer shooting long single takes, not wanting actors to rehearse too much so that their lines would stay fresh. The tourists mostly ignored the film crew, which was so small that Poupaud likened it to "a small family making a summer vacation movie".

Rohmer gave permission for the film's production manager, Françoise Etchegaray, to film the making of A Summer's Tale. This is the only time the shooting of a Rohmer film was itself recorded. Jean-André Fieschi was given the footage for editing after a chance meeting with Etchegaray in late 1995, but the completed documentary, La Fabrique du Conte d’été ("The making of A Summer's Tale"), lay forgotten for ten years. Rohmer agreed to release it in 2006. It was included in several DVD releases of the film.

== Music ==
As is typical for Rohmer, the film has no non-diegetic music, except in the final scene. The sea shanty "Corsair's Daughter", which Gaspard writes during the course of the film, was written by Rohmer, who credited himself under the pseudonym "Sébastien Erms", as he did for music he wrote for his previous films.

== Release ==
In 1996, due to various economic issues with independent movie theaters and home video, the film was not released in the United States along with many other foreign films. It finally received a limited release on 20 June 2014.
