= Claire's Knee =

1970 French film by Éric Rohmer

- Film poster
- Directed by: Éric Rohmer
- Written by: Éric Rohmer
- Produced by: Barbet Schroeder; Pierre Cottrell
- Starring: Jean-Claude Brialy; Aurora Cornu; Béatrice Romand; Laurence de Monaghan
- Cinematography: Néstor Almendros
- Edited by: Cécile Decugis
- Production company: Les Films du Losange
- Distributed by: Les Films du Losange (France); Columbia Pictures (USA)
- Release dates: 11 December 1970 (France); 21 February 1971 (USA)
- Running time: 106 minutes
- Country: France
- Language: French
- Box office: 638,445 admissions (France)

Claire's Knee (French: Le Genou de Claire) is a 1970 French romantic drama film written and directed by Éric Rohmer. Starring Jean-Claude Brialy, Aurora Cornu, Béatrice Romand, and Laurence de Monaghan, it follows a soon-to-be-married man and his conflicted relationship with two teenage girls. The film is the fifth entry in Rohmer's series of Six Moral Tales (1963–1972).

Upon its release in France on 11 December 1970, Claire's Knee received critical acclaim, and it was awarded the Louis Delluc Prize for Best French Film of the year. Abroad, it was named Best Film by the National Society of Film Critics, and Best Foreign Language Film by the National Board of Review.

== Plot ==
(The story takes place between 29 June and 29 July, presumably in 1970. Intertitles of the dates are displayed before the daily events are shown.)

Shortly before his wedding, career diplomat Jérôme travels from Stockholm to Lake Annecy to sell his family vacation home. He is surprised to run into Aurora, a novelist friend he has not seen in years, who is staying with a woman and her teenage daughter across the lake. He visits, and meets Madame Walter, who he actually knew casually from his time spent at the lake in his youth, and Laura, her daughter. The observant Aurora detects that Laura has a crush on Jérôme, and tells him, encouraging him to spend time with the girl so she can watch what happens and maybe get story ideas. Saying he has eyes for no one but his fiancée, but that he wants to help his friend, Jérôme complies.

On a hike alone, Jérôme and Laura talk intimately and Jérôme kisses her, but she pulls away, as she knows he does not really have feelings for her, and she wants true love. The next day, they talk, and Laura says she does not like her peers, hypothesizing that she is attracted to older men as surrogates for her deceased father.

Claire, Laura's ex-step-sister (after Laura's father died, Laura's mother married, but subsequently divorced, Claire's father), arrives for a visit, and the attractive blonde catches Jérôme's eye. When he sees her exposed knee while she is on a ladder picking cherries with her boyfriend, Gilles, he finds himself longing to touch it, but controls his temptation. Later, he tells Aurora that his relationship with Laura is evaporating, but he thinks it might be interesting for her writing if he pursues Claire, who is the kind of girl he is attracted to, but not the kind he usually ends up dating.

After Laura leaves to vacation in Cheltenham, Jérôme sees Gilles walking in Annecy with a friend named Muriel. Jérôme is giving Claire a boat ride to town later that day when the weather changes, and they quickly head to shore, finding shelter in a hut just as it begins to pour down rain. He learns she thinks Gilles is in Grenoble visiting his mother, and tells Claire what he saw in Annecy. Claire starts to cry, and Jérôme gives her a handkerchief and consoles her by placing his hand upon her knee. When the rain stops, he takes her home.

Jérôme later delightedly tells Aurora about his excursion with Claire, describing how well he feels he navigated such a complicated situation. He says touching Claire's knee exorcised his desire for her, and feels he did a good deed by getting Claire away from Gilles, though Aurora thinks Claire will probably just end up with someone worse.

Just before Jérôme returns to Stockholm and his fiancée, Aurora reveals she is also engaged, though she had repeatedly indicated she was single. Gilles drives up right after Jérôme leaves in his boat, and Aurora eavesdrops as Claire confronts him about not really going to see his mother and being with Muriel. Gilles says he had car problems, and Muriel was upset, so he was just consoling her.

== Cast ==
- Jean-Claude Brialy as Jérôme Montcharvin, a diplomat selling his family vacation home
- Aurora Cornu as Aurora, a novelist and old friend of Jérôme
- Béatrice Romand as Laura, Claire's ex-step-sister
- Laurence de Monaghan as Claire, Laura's ex-step-sister
- Michèle Montel as Madame Walter, Laura's mother
- Gérard Falconetti as Gilles, Claire's boyfriend
- Fabrice Luchini as Vincent, Laura's friend

== Reception ==
Claire's Knee received the Louis Delluc Prize for Best French Film of the year, the 1971 Prix Méliès, and the Grand Prix at the San Sebastián International Film Festival. It was named Best Film by the National Society of Film Critics, and Best Foreign Language Film by the National Board of Review. At the 29th Golden Globe Awards, it was nominated for Best Foreign Language Film.

Vincent Canby of The New York Times called Claire's Knee "something close to a perfect film". Cecile Mury of Télérama said: "This camera outdoors gives the appearance of a small story where it goes 'nothing'. Yet these 'fragments of a love speech' make up a special study of desire, verbal pleasure, almost literary, which accompanies every inclination. A jewel."

On the review aggregator website Rotten Tomatoes, 96% of 23 critics' reviews of the film are positive, with an average rating of 8.3/10; the site's "critics consensus" reads: "Told through precise body language and sunny wit, Claire's Knee makes an unusual love story feel universal."

== Style ==
Claire's Knee was Rohmer's second film shot in color. He explained: "the presence of the lake and the mountains is stronger in color than in black and white. It is a film I couldn't imagine in black and white. The color green seems to me essential in that film...This film would have no value to me in black and white."

The film's visual aesthetics and narrative style has been cited as inspiring Luca Guadagnino's Call Me by Your Name (2017).
