= Jay Russell =

American film director

- Russell on the set of Ladder 49 in 2003
- Born: January 10, 1960 (age 66); North Little Rock, Arkansas, U.S.
- Occupations: Film director, producer
- Years active: 1987–present
- Spouse: Lee Cunningham (m. 1991)

Jay Russell (born January 10, 1960, in North Little Rock, Arkansas), is an American film director, writer and producer.

== Biography ==
He graduated from Columbia University in 1985 with a MFA in screenwriting and directing, having studied with producer Michael Hausman and director Miloš Forman. He wrote the screenplay and served as director for his debut film, End of the Line (1987), which was a Sundance Institute project and was released by Orion Classics. In 1996 he directed two episodes of the PBS documentary mini-series Great Drives; notably interviewing Willie Morris for the episode "Highway 61: Memphis to New Orleans".

Russell returned to feature film directing with the Warner Bros. family film My Dog Skip (2000). He next directed the Disney film, Tuck Everlasting (2002) and Ladder 49 (2004). He directed The Water Horse (2007) for Columbia Pictures. For the Hallmark Channel he directed the original film One Christmas Eve (2014).

Russell served as a producer on Whole Lotta Sole (2011) and the 2015 stage adaptation of the Cornell Woolrich thriller Rear Window, starring his End of the Line and My Dog Skip (2000) collaborator Kevin Bacon.

== Filmography ==
- End of the Line (1987)
- Great Drives
  - Highway 61 (1996)
  - Highway 93 (1996)
- My Dog Skip (2000)
- Tuck Everlasting (2002)
- Ladder 49 (2004)
- The Water Horse: Legend of the Deep (2007)
- One Christmas Eve (2014)
