= United Artists =

American film and distribution company

- Formerly: United Artists Corporation (1919–1986); United Artists Pictures Inc. (1986–2000); United Artists Films Inc. (2000–2006); United Artists Entertainment LLC (2006–2011)
- Type: Subsidiary
- Industry: Film; Television
- Founded: February 5, 1919; 107 years ago in Hollywood, Los Angeles, California, United States (original; as United Artists Corporation); July 26, 2024; 2 years ago (relaunch; under the United Artists label)
- Founders: Charlie Chaplin; Mary Pickford; Douglas Fairbanks; D. W. Griffith
- Defunct: 2011; 15 years ago (original)
- Fate: Folded into Metro-Goldwyn-Mayer (original)
- Headquarters: Culver City, California, United States
- Area served: Worldwide
- Key people: Scott Stuber
- Products: Motion pictures
- Parent: Transamerica Corporation (1967–1981); Metro-Goldwyn-Mayer (1981–2024); Amazon MGM Studios (2024–present)
- Divisions: United Artists Records (1957–1978); United Artists Television (1958–1982); United Artists Broadcasting (1968–1977); United Artists Classics (1980–1984)
- Website: mgm.com

United Artists (UA) is an American film and television production and distribution company owned by Amazon MGM Studios. In its original operating period, it was founded on February 5, 1919 by Charlie Chaplin, D. W. Griffith, Mary Pickford and Douglas Fairbanks as a venture premised on allowing actors to control their own financial and artistic interests rather than being dependent upon commercial studios.

After numerous ownership and structural changes and revamps, United Artists was acquired by media conglomerate Metro-Goldwyn-Mayer (MGM) in 1981 for a reported $350 million ($1.2 billion today). On September 22, 2014, MGM acquired a controlling interest in One Three Media and Lightworkers Media and merged them to revive the television production unit of United Artists as United Artists Media Group (UAMG). MGM itself acquired UAMG on December 14, 2015, and folded it into their own television division.

MGM briefly revived the United Artists brand as United Artists Digital Studios for the Stargate Origins web series as part of its Stargate franchise, but retired the name after 2019 and instead used its eponymous brand for subsequent releases.

A local joint distribution venture between MGM and Annapurna Pictures launched on October 31, 2017 was rebranded as United Artists Releasing on February 5, 2019, in honor of its 100th anniversary. However, Amazon, MGM's now-parent company, folded UAR into MGM on March 4, 2023, citing "newfound theatrical release opportunities" following the box-office opening success of Creed III.

On July 26, 2024, Amazon MGM Studios announced the company's revival, entering a multi-year first look deal with film producer Scott Stuber, who will also be involved with all releases under the freshly revived production company.

== History ==
United Artists' first logo, used until the company's sale to Transamerica in 1967

=== Early years ===
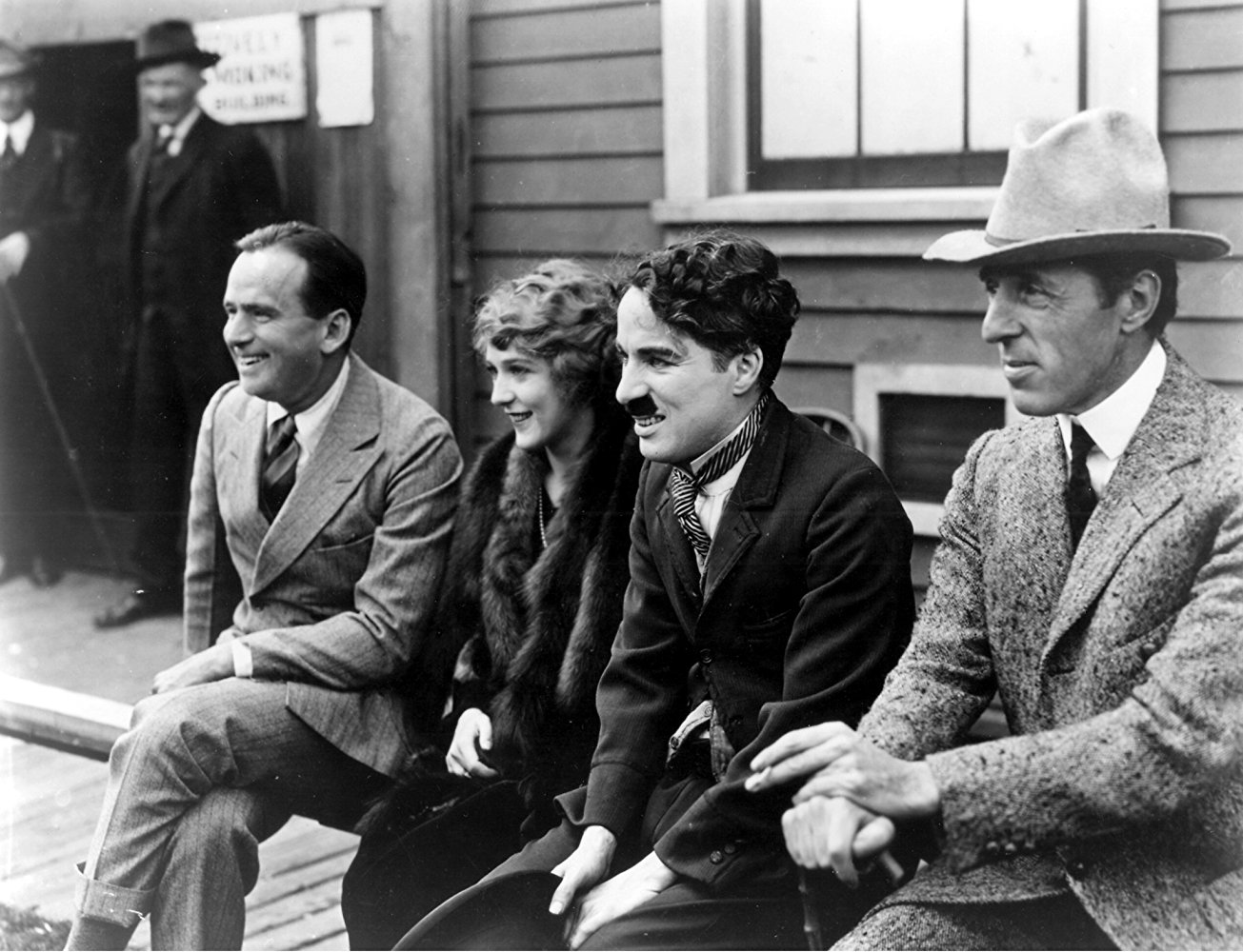
Douglas Fairbanks, Mary Pickford, Charlie Chaplin, and D. W. Griffith in 1919

In 1918, Charlie Chaplin could not get his parent company First National Pictures to increase his production budget despite being one of their top producers. Mary Pickford and Douglas Fairbanks had their own contracts, with First National and Famous Players–Lasky respectively, but these were due to run out with no clear offers forthcoming. Sydney Chaplin, brother and business manager for Charlie, deduced something was going wrong, and contacted Pickford and Fairbanks. Together they hired a private detective, who discovered a plan to merge all production companies and to lock in "exhibition companies" to a series of five-year contracts.

Chaplin, Pickford, Fairbanks, and D. W. Griffith incorporated United Artists as a joint venture company on February 5, 1919. Each held a 25% stake in the preferred shares and a 20% stake in the common shares of the joint venture, with the remaining 20% of common shares held by lawyer and advisor William Gibbs McAdoo. The idea for the venture originated with Fairbanks, Chaplin, Pickford and cowboy star William S. Hart a year earlier. Already Hollywood veterans, the four stars talked of forming their own company to better control their own work.

They were spurred on by established Hollywood producers and distributors who were tightening their control over actor salaries and creative decisions, a process that evolved into the studio system. With the addition of Griffith, planning began, but Hart bowed out before anything was formalized. When he heard about their scheme, Richard A. Rowland, head of Metro Pictures, apparently said, "The inmates are taking over the asylum." The four partners, with advice from McAdoo (son-in-law and former Treasury Secretary of then-President Woodrow Wilson), formed their distribution company. Hiram Abrams was its first managing director, and the company established its headquarters at 729 Seventh Avenue in New York City.

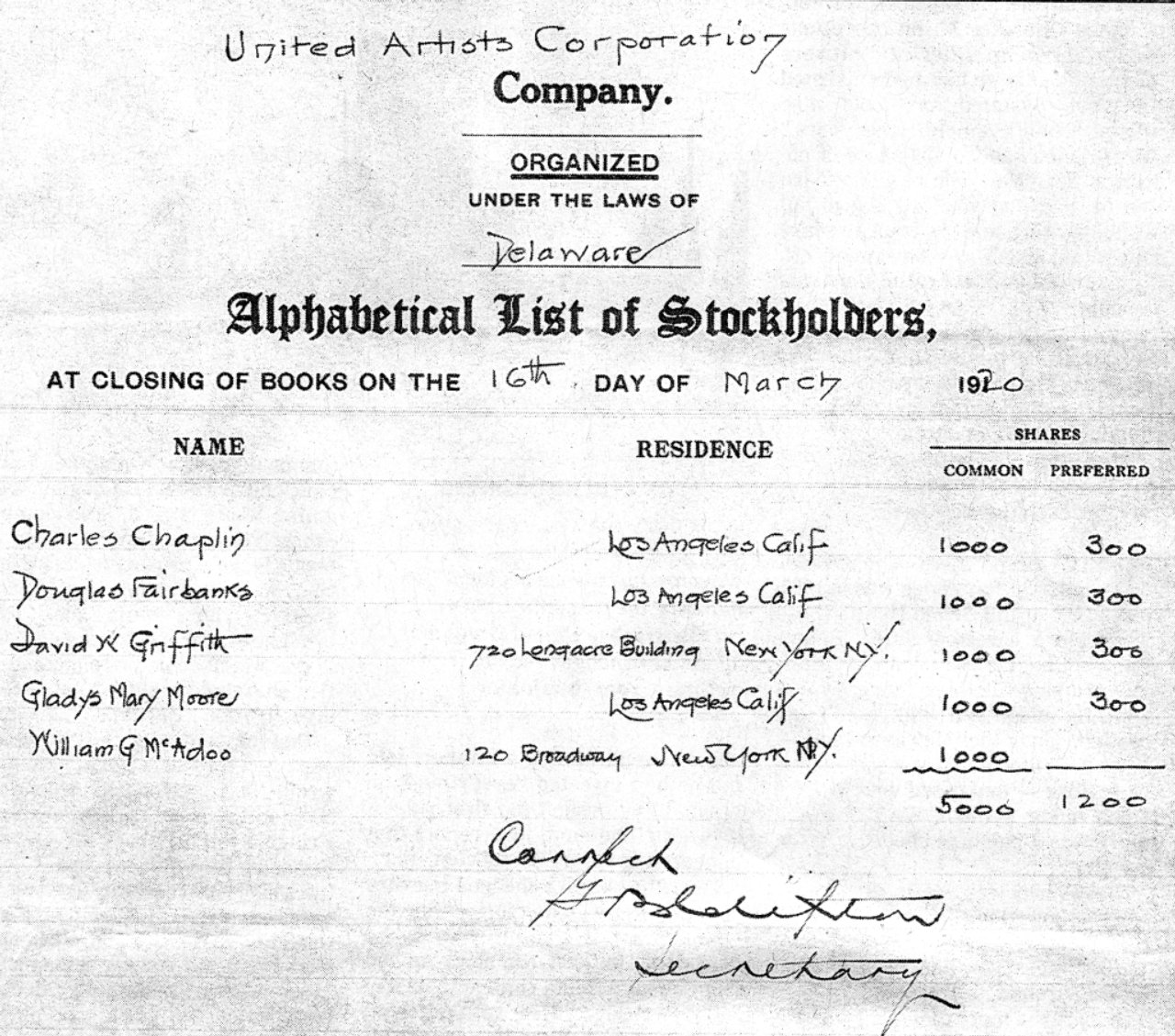
List of UA stockholders in 1920

The original terms called for each star to produce five pictures a year. By the time the company was operational in 1921, feature films were becoming more expensive and polished, and running times had settled at around ninety minutes (eight reels). The original goal was thus abandoned.

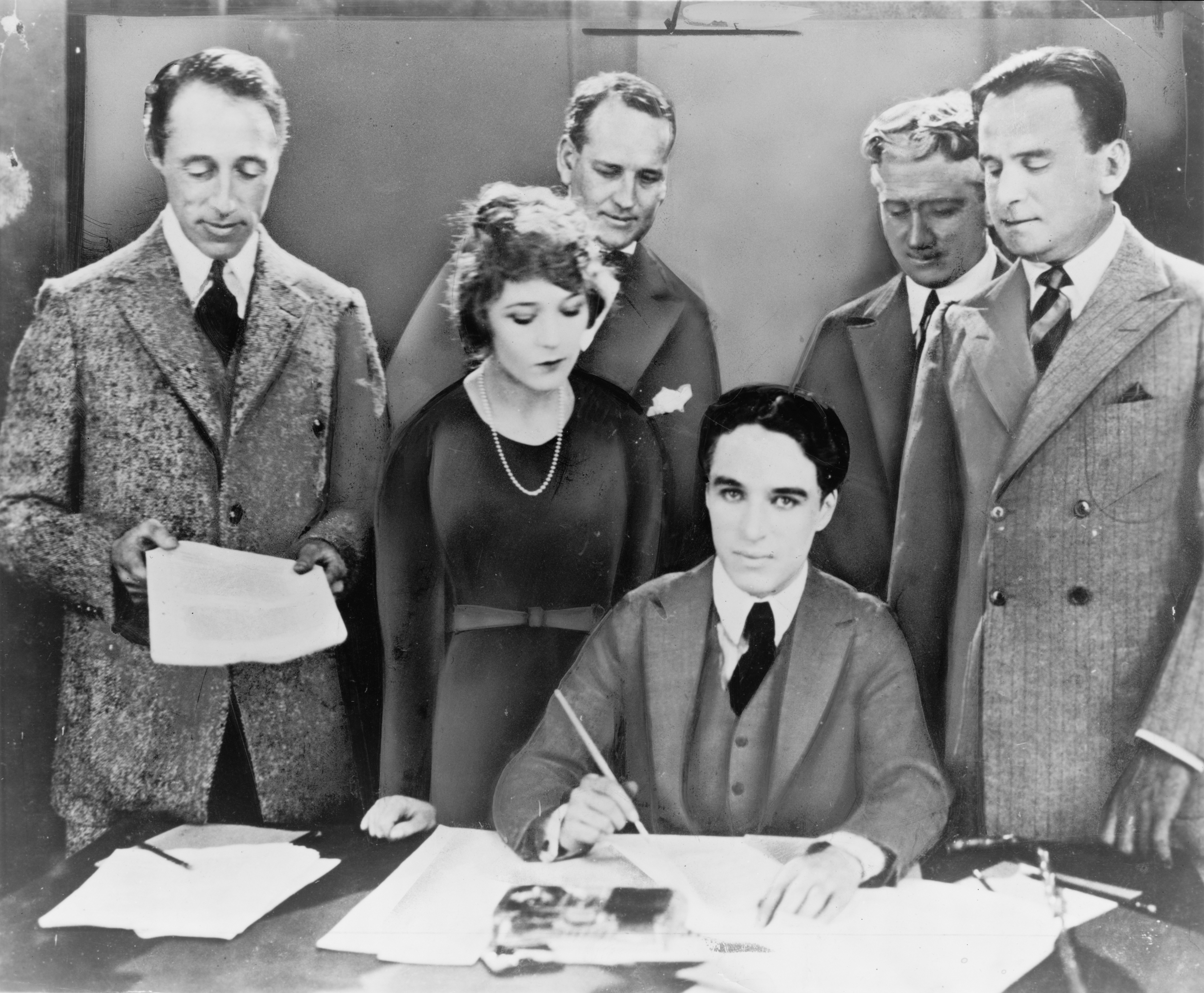
Griffith, Pickford, Chaplin (seated), and Fairbanks at the signing of the contract establishing the United Artists motion-picture studio in 1919. Lawyers Albert Banzhaf (left) and Dennis F. O'Brien (right) stand in the background.

UA's first production, His Majesty, the American, written by and starring Fairbanks, was a success. Funding for movies was limited. Without selling stock to the public like other studios, all United had for finance was weekly prepayment installments from theater owners for upcoming movies. As a result, production was slow, and the company distributed an average of only five films a year in its first five years.

By 1924, Griffith had dropped out, and the company was facing a crisis. Veteran producer Joseph Schenck was hired as president. He had produced pictures for a decade, and brought commitments for films starring his wife, Norma Talmadge, his sister-in-law, Constance Talmadge, and his brother-in-law, Buster Keaton. Contracts were signed with independent producers, including Samuel Goldwyn, and Howard Hughes. In 1933, Schenck organized a new company with Darryl F. Zanuck, called Twentieth Century Pictures, which soon provided four pictures a year, forming half of UA's schedule.

Schenck formed a separate partnership with Pickford and Chaplin to buy and build theaters under the United Artists name. They began international operations, first in Canada, and then in Mexico. By the end of the 1930s, United Artists was represented in over 40 countries.

When he was denied an ownership share in 1935, Schenck resigned. He set up 20th Century Pictures' merger with Fox Film Corporation to form 20th Century-Fox. Al Lichtman succeeded Schenck as company president. Other independent producers distributed through United Artists in the 1930s including Walt Disney, Alexander Korda, Hal Roach, David O. Selznick, and Walter Wanger. As the years passed, and the dynamics of the business changed, these "producing partners" drifted away. Samuel Goldwyn Productions and Walt Disney Productions went to RKO Radio Pictures and Wanger to Universal Pictures.

In the late 1930s, UA turned a profit. Goldwyn was providing most of the output for distribution. He sued United several times for disputed compensation leading him to leave. MGM's 1939 hit Gone with the Wind was supposed to be a UA release except that Selznick wanted Clark Gable, who was under contract to MGM, to play Rhett Butler. Also that year, Fairbanks died.

UA became embroiled in lawsuits with Selznick over his distribution of some films through RKO. Selznick considered UA's operation sloppy, and left to start his own distribution arm.

In the 1940s, United Artists was losing money because of poorly received pictures. Cinema attendance continued to decline as television became more popular. The company sold its Mexican releasing division to Crédito Cinematográfico Mexicano, a local company.

=== Society of Independent Motion Picture Producers (1940s and 1950s) ===
In 1941, Pickford, Chaplin, Disney, Orson Welles, Goldwyn, Selznick, Alexander Korda, and Wanger—many of whom were members of United Artists—formed the Society of Independent Motion Picture Producers (SIMPP). Later members included Hunt Stromberg, William Cagney, Sol Lesser, and Hal Roach.

The Society aimed to advance the interests of independent producers in an industry controlled by the studio system. SIMPP fought to end what were considered to be anti-competitive practices by the seven major film studios—Loew's (MGM), Columbia Pictures, Paramount Pictures, Universal Pictures, RKO Radio Pictures, 20th Century-Fox, and Warner Bros./First National—that controlled the production, distribution, and exhibition of motion pictures.

In 1942, SIMPP filed an antitrust suit against Paramount's United Detroit Theatres. The complaint accused Paramount of conspiracy to control first-and subsequent-run theaters in Detroit. This was the first antitrust suit brought by producers against exhibitors that alleged monopoly and restraint of trade. In 1948, the U.S. Supreme Court Paramount Decision ordered the major Hollywood movie studios to sell their theater chains and to end certain anti-competitive practices. This court ruling ended the studio system.

By 1958, SIMPP had achieved many of the goals that led to its creation, and the group ceased operations.

=== Krim and Benjamin ===
Needing a turnaround, Pickford and Chaplin hired Paul V. McNutt in 1950, a former governor of Indiana, as chairman and Frank L. McNamee as president. McNutt did not have the skill to solve UA's financial problems and the pair was replaced after only a few months.

On February 15, 1951, lawyers-turned-producers Arthur B. Krim (of Eagle-Lion Films), Robert Benjamin and Matty Fox approached Pickford and Chaplin with an idea: let them take over United Artists for ten years. If UA was profitable in one of the next three years, they would have the option to acquire half the company by the end of the ten years and take full control. 20th Century-Fox president Spyros Skouras extended United Artists a $3 million loan through Krim and Benjamin's efforts.

In taking over UA, Krim and Benjamin created the first studio without an actual "studio". Primarily acting as bankers, they offered money to independent producers. UA leased space at the Pickford/Fairbanks Studio but did not own a studio lot. Thus UA did not have the overhead, the maintenance, or the expensive production staff at other studios.

Among their first clients were Sam Spiegel and John Huston, whose Horizon Productions gave UA one major hit, The African Queen (1951) and a substantial success, Moulin Rouge (1952). Besides The African Queen UA also had success with High Noon in their first year, earning a profit of $313,000 compared to a loss of $871,000 the previous year. Other clients followed, among them Stanley Kramer, Otto Preminger, Hecht-Hill-Lancaster Productions, and actors newly freed from studio contracts and seeking to produce or direct their own films.

With the instability in the film industry due to theater divestment, the business was considered risky. In 1955, movie attendance reached its lowest level since 1923. Chaplin sold his 25% share during this crisis to Krim and Benjamin for $1.1 million, followed a year later by Pickford who sold her share for $3 million.

In the late 1950s, United Artists produced two modest films that became financial and critical successes for the company. The company made Marty which won 1955's Palme d'Or and Best Picture in the Oscars, and 12 Angry Men (1957), which according to Krim before home video, was being seen on television 24 hours a day, 365 days a year some place in the world. By 1958, UA was making annual profits of $3 million a year.

=== Public company ===
United Artists went public in 1957 with a $17 million stock and debenture offering. The company was averaging 50 films a year. In 1958, UA acquired Ilya Lopert's Lopert Pictures Corporation, which released foreign films that attracted criticism or was censoed elsewhere.

In 1957, UA created United Artists Records Corporation and United Artists Music Corporation after an unsuccessful attempt to buy a record company. In 1968, UA Records merged with Liberty Records, along with its many subsidiary labels such as Imperial Records and Dolton Records. In 1972, the group was consolidated into one entity as United Artists Records and in 1979, EMI acquired the division which included Blue Note Records.

In 1959, after failing to sell several pilots, United Artists offered its first ever television series, The Troubleshooters, and later released its first sitcom, The Dennis O'Keefe Show.

In the 1960s, mainstream studios fell into decline and some were acquired or diversified. UA prospered while winning 11 Academy Awards, including five for Best Picture, adding relationships with the Mirisch brothers, Billy Wilder, Joseph E. Levine and others. In 1961, United Artists released West Side Story, which won ten Academy Awards (including Best Picture).

In 1960, UA purchased Ziv Television Programs. UA's television division was responsible for shows such as Gilligan's Island, The Fugitive, Outer Limits, and The Patty Duke Show. The television unit had begun to build up a profitable rental library, including Associated Artists Productions, owners of Warner Bros.' pre-1950 (Note: WB retained a pair of features from 1949 that they merely distributed, and all short subjects released on or after September 1, 1948, in addition to all cartoons released in August 1948.) features, shorts and cartoons and 231 Popeye cartoon shorts purchased from Paramount Pictures in 1958, becoming United Artists Associated, its distribution division.

In 1963, UA released two Stanley Kramer films, It's A Mad, Mad, Mad, Mad World and A Child Is Waiting. In 1964, UA introduced U.S. film audiences to the Beatles by releasing A Hard Day's Night (1964) and Help! (1965).

At the same time, it backed two expatriate North Americans in Britain, who had acquired screen rights to Ian Fleming's James Bond novels. For $1 million, UA backed Harry Saltzman and Albert Broccoli's Dr. No in 1963 and launched the James Bond franchise. The franchise outlived UA's time as a major studio, continuing half a century later. Other successful projects backed in this period included the Pink Panther series, which began in 1964, and Spaghetti Westerns, which made a star of Clint Eastwood in the films of A Fistful of Dollars, For a Few Dollars More and The Good, The Bad and The Ugly.

In 1964, the French subsidiary, Les Productions Artistes Associés, released its first production That Man from Rio.

In 1965, UA released the anticipated George Stevens' production of The Greatest Story Ever Told and was at the time, the most expensive film which was budgeted at $20 million. Max Von Sydow, in the role of Jesus Christ, led an all-star cast which included Charlton Heston, Roddy McDowell, Martin Landau, Dorothy McGuire, Sal Mineo, Ina Balin, Joanna Dunham, David McCallum, Nehemiah Persoff, Donald Pleasence, José Ferrer and Ed Wynn. The film did not make back its budget and was released to mixed critical reception. However, it has since been acclaimed as a classic by audiences around the world for being admirably inspired in its attempt to be faithful to the four books of the New Testament in the Holy Bible as well as the book of the same name by Fulton Oursler and the radio program which ran from 1947 to 1956. The Greatest Story Ever Told received five Academy Award nominations in 1965 and was also listed among the "Top 10 Films of the Year" by the National Board of Review.

=== Transamerica subsidiary ===
United Artists' second logo, used during the company's sale to Transamerica from 1967 until 1982

On the basis of its film and television hits, in 1967, Transamerica Corporation purchased 98% of UA's stock. Transamerica selected David and Arnold Picker to lead its studio. UA debuted a new logo incorporating the parent company's striped T emblem and the tagline "Entertainment from Transamerica Corporation". This wording was later shortened to "A Transamerica Company". The following year, in 1968, United Artists Associated was reincorporated as United Artists Television Distribution. In 1970, UA lost $35 million, and the Pickers were pushed aside for the return of Krim and Benjamin.

UA released another Best Picture Oscar winner in 1967, In the Heat of the Night and a nominee for Best Picture, The Graduate, an Embassy production that UA distributed overseas.

Other successful pictures included the 1971 screen version of Fiddler on the Roof. However, the 1972 film version of Man of La Mancha was a failure. New talent was encouraged, including Woody Allen, Robert Altman, Sylvester Stallone, Saul Zaentz, Miloš Forman, and Brian De Palma. With UA being the distributor for Woody Allen's Bananas (1971), it started as the distributor for a series of Woody Allen films. With the James Bond, Pink Panther, and Woody Allen films, UA had a series of films based on well known characters in the 1970s.

In 1973, United Artists took over the sales and distribution of MGM's films in Anglo-America. Cinema International Corporation assumed international distribution rights for MGM's films and carried on to United International Pictures (made from CIC and UA's International assets being owned by partner MGM) in the 1980s. As part of the deal, UA acquired MGM's music publishing operation, Robbins, Feist, Miller.

In 1975, Harry Saltzman sold UA his 50% stake in Danjaq, the holding-company for the Bond films.

UA agreed to release One Flew Over the Cuckoo's Nest in 1975, after many other studios turned it down. Producer Michael Douglas later said "United Artists, respectfully, was like your last choice in those days but they made us a decent deal". The film won the Best Picture Academy Award and was UA's highest-grossing film, with a gross of $163 million. UA followed with the next two years' Best Picture Oscar winners, Rocky and Annie Hall, becoming the first studio to win the award for three years running and also to become the studio with the most Best Picture winners at that time, with 11.

However, Transamerica was not pleased with UA's releases such as Midnight Cowboy and Last Tango in Paris that were rated X by the Motion Picture Association of America. In these instances, Transamerica demanded the byline "A Transamerica Company" be removed on the prints and in all advertising. At one point, the parent company expressed its desire to phase out the UA name and replace it with Transamerica Films. Krim tried to convince Transamerica to spin off United Artists, but he and Transamerica's chairman could not come to an agreement. Finally in 1978, following a dispute with Transamerica chief John R. Beckett over administrative expenses, UA's top executives, including chairman Krim, president Eric Pleskow, Benjamin and other key officers walked out. Within days they announced the formation of Orion Pictures, with backing from Warner Bros. The departures concerned several Hollywood figures enough that they took out an ad in a trade paper warning Transamerica that it had made a fatal mistake in letting them go. Later that year, it entered into a partnership with Lorimar Productions, whereas United Artists would distribute Lorimar's feature films theatrically, while Lorimar was planning to produce television series and miniseries adaptations from UA's feature film library.

Transamerica inserted Andy Albeck as UA's president. United had its most successful year with four hits in 1979: Rocky II, Manhattan, Moonraker, and The Black Stallion.

The new leadership agreed to back Heaven's Gate, a project of director Michael Cimino, which vastly overran its budget and cost $44 million. This led to the resignation of Albeck, who was replaced by Norbert Auerbach. United Artists recorded a major loss for the year due almost entirely to the box-office failure of Heaven's Gate. It destroyed UA's reputation with Transamerica and the greater Hollywood community. However, it may have saved the United Artists name; UA's final head before the sale, Steven Bach, wrote in his book Final Cut that there had been talk about renaming United Artists to Transamerica Pictures.

In 1980, Transamerica decided to exit the film making business, and put United Artists on the market. Kirk Kerkorian's Tracinda Corp. purchased the company in 1981. Tracinda also owned Metro-Goldwyn-Mayer.

==== United Artists Classics ====
In 1981, United Artists Classics, which formerly re-released library titles, was turned into a first-run art film distributor by Nathaniel T. Kwit, Jr. Tom Bernard was hired as the division director, as well as handling theatrical sales, and Ira Deutchman was hired as head of marketing. Later the division added Michael Barker and Donna Gigliotti. Deutchman left to form Cinecom, and Barker and Bernard formed Orion Classics and Sony Pictures Classics. The label mostly released foreign and independent films such as Cutter's Way, Ticket to Heaven and The Grey Fox, and occasional first-run reissues from the UA library, such as director's cuts of Head Over Heels. When Barker and Bernard left to form Orion Classics, the label was briefly rechristened in 1984 as MGM/UA Classics before it ceased operating in the late 1980s.

=== MGM/UA Entertainment Company ===
Logo used from 1982 to 1987

The merged studios became known as the MGM/UA Entertainment Company, and in 1982 began launching new subsidiaries: the MGM/UA Home Entertainment Group, MGM/UA Classics and MGM/UA Television Group. Kerkorian also bid for the remaining, outstanding public stock, but dropped his bid, facing lawsuits and vocal opposition.

In 1981, Fred Silverman and George Reeves via InterMedia Entertainment struck a deal with the studio to produce films and television shows.

After the purchase, David Begelman's duties were transferred from MGM to MGM/UA. Under Begelman, MGM/UA produced unsuccessful films and he was fired in July 1982. Of the 11 films he put into production, by the time of his termination only Poltergeist proved to be a hit.

As part of the consolidation, in 1983, MGM closed United Artists' long time headquarters at 729 Seventh Avenue in New York City. MGM/UA sold the former UA music publishing division to CBS Songs in 1983.

WarGames and Octopussy made substantial profits for the new MGM/UA in 1983, but were not sufficient for Kerkorian. It did not help that WarGames was briefly caught in a legal dispute with EMI Films concerning the film's funding and international rights. A 1985-restructuring led to independent MGM and UA production units with the combined studio leaders each placed in charge of a single unit. Speculation from analysts was that one of the studios, most likely UA, would be sold to fund the other's (MGM) stock buy-back to take that studio private. However, soon afterwards, one unit's chief was fired and the remaining executive, Alan Ladd, Jr., took charge of both.

==== Turner ====
On August 7, 1985, Ted Turner announced that his Turner Broadcasting System would buy MGM/UA. As film licensing to television became more complicated, Turner saw the value of acquiring MGM's film library for his superstation WTBS. Under the terms of the deal, Turner would immediately sell United Artists back to Kerkorian.

In anticipation, Kerkorian installed film producer Jerry Weintraub as the chairman and chief executive of United Artists Corporation in November 1985; former ABC executive Anthony Thomopoulos was recruited as UA's president. Weintraub's tenure at UA was brief; he left the studio in April 1986, replaced by former Lorimar executive Lee Rich. In anticipation, during the split, SLM Production Group moved its distribution deal to United Artists, after having left MGM/UA temporarily for 20th Century Fox.

On March 25, 1986, Turner finalized his acquisition of MGM/UA in a cash-stock deal for $1.5 billion and renamed it MGM Entertainment Co. Kerkorian then repurchased most of United Artists' assets for roughly $480 million. As a result of this transaction, the original United Artists ceased to exist. Kerkorian, for all intents and purposes, created an entirely new company implementing the inherited assets; thus, the present day UA is not the legal successor to the original incarnation, though it shares similar assets. United Artists announced plans to launch its new headquarters on Beverly Hills, which was set to take effect on November 1, 1985, shortly before the Turner deal was finalized. On April 23, 1986, United Artists and Hoyts, the Australian cinema chain and distribution company, signed a three-picture deal to co-produce films.

=== MGM/UA Communications Company ===
Logo used from 1987 to 1994

Due to financial community concerns over his debt load, Ted Turner was forced to sell MGM's production and distribution assets to United Artists for $300 million on August 26, 1986. The MGM lot and lab facilities were sold to Lorimar-Telepictures. Turner kept the pre-May 1986 MGM film and television library, along with the Associated Artists Productions library, and the RKO Pictures films that United Artists had previously purchased. On August 21, 1986, United Artists announced its re-entry into film production; Baby Boom and Real Men were the first new films to commence production, with a slate of 26 films to follow in development.

United Artists was renamed MGM/UA Communications Company and organized into three main units: one television production and two film units. David Gerber headed up the television unit with Anthony Thomopoulous at United Artists, and Alan Ladd, Jr. at MGM. Despite a resurgence at the box office in 1987 with Spaceballs, The Living Daylights, and Moonstruck, MGM/UA lost $88 million. That November, Hoyts and United Artists decided to end their co-production partnership.

In April 1988, Kerkorian's 82 percent of MGM/UA was up for sale; MGM and UA were split by July. Eventually, 25 percent of MGM was offered to Burt Sugarman, and producers Jon Peters and Peter Guber, but the plan later fell through. Rich, Ladd, Thomopoulous and other executives grew tired of Kerkorian's antics and began to leave. By summer 1988, the mass exodus of executives started to affect productions, with many film cancellations. The 1989 sale of MGM/UA to the Australian company Qintex/Australian Television Network (owners of the Hal Roach library, which both MGM and United Artists had distributed in the 1930s) also fell through, due to the company's bankruptcy later that year; Ted Turner attempted to buy the assets again but failed. UA was essentially dormant after 1990 and released no films for several years.

=== The 1990s ===
In November 1990, Italian financier Giancarlo Parretti purchased MGM/UA. He'd previously purchased Cannon Films and renamed it Pathé Communications, anticipating a successful purchase of Pathé, the famed French film company. But his attempt failed – largely from the French government looking into Parretti's shady past – and instead he merged MGM/UA with his former company, resulting in MGM-Pathé Communications Co. During the transaction, Parretti overstated his own financial condition and obtained a loan under false pretenses; this was a harbinger of the chaos the studio fell into under his ownership. Debts went unpaid, forcing the delay of several films, as Parretti looted the company, fired most of the financial staff and feuded with Alan Ladd Jr. over control. To prevent any further damage (and in part to prevent their own financial misdeeds from coming to light), Crédit Lyonnais, Parretti's primary lender, foreclosed on the studio in 1992. This resulted in Parretti defaulting on his loans and subsequently being convicted of securities fraud. On July 2, 1992, MGM-Pathé Communications was again named Metro-Goldwyn-Mayer, Inc. In an effort to make MGM/UA saleable, Credit Lyonnais ramped up production and convinced John Calley to run UA. Under his supervision, Calley revived the Pink Panther and James Bond franchises and highlighted UA's past by giving the widest release ever to a film with an NC-17 rating, Showgirls. Credit Lyonnais sold MGM in 1996, again to Kirk Kerkorian's Tracinda, leading to Calley's departure.

In 1999, filmmaker Francis Ford Coppola attempted to buy UA from Kerkorian who rejected the offer. Coppola signed a production deal with the studio instead.

=== The 2000s to the 2020s ===
Logo used from 2000 to 2010

In June 1999, MGM announced that it would restructure United Artists as an arthouse film producer/distributor, while the existing mainstream film production and staff of the company would be consolidated under MGM itself. Both MGM and UA commonly competed against one another in the independent film market, and the restructuring would allow UA to solely focus its attention on competing with Disney's Miramax Films division. G2 Films, the renamed Samuel Goldwyn Company, was renamed as United Artists International but retained the same management and staff. The distributorship, branding, and copyrights for two of UA's main franchises (Pink Panther, and Rocky) were moved to MGM, although select MGM releases (notably the James Bond franchise co-held with Danjaq, LLC and the Amityville Horror remake) carry a United Artists copyright. The first arthouse film to bear the UA name was Things You Can Tell Just by Looking at Her.

In July 2000, MGM announced that it would shut down United Artists International and release all future UA films overseas under its new distribution deal with 20th Century Fox that was due to begin in November of that year. MGM stated that the closure had been planned as early as December 1999, stating that lucrative international TV output deals had affected the box office results for UA's recent films internationally. The mainstream North American division was unaffected by the changes.

United Artists hired Bingham Ray to run the company on September 1, 2001. Under his supervision, the company produced and distributed many art films, including Bowling for Columbine, 2002's Nicholas Nickleby, and the winner of that year's Academy Award for Best Foreign Language Film, No Man's Land; and 2004's Undertow, and Hotel Rwanda, a co-production of UA and Lions Gate Entertainment, and made deals with companies like American Zoetrope and Revolution Films. Ray stepped down from the company in 2004.

In 2005, a partnership of Comcast, Sony and several merchant banks bought United Artists and its parent, MGM, for $4.8 billion. Though only a minority investor, Sony closed MGM's distribution system and folded most of its staff into its own studio. The movies UA had completed and planned for release—Capote, Art School Confidential, The Woods, and Romance and Cigarettes —were reassigned to Sony Pictures Classics.

In March 2006, MGM announced that it would return again as a domestic distribution company. Striking distribution deals with The Weinstein Company (TWC), Lakeshore Entertainment, Bauer Martinez Entertainment, and other independent studios, MGM distributed films from these companies. MGM continued funding and co-producing projects released in conjunction with Sony's Columbia TriStar Motion Picture Group on a limited basis and produced tent-poles for its own distribution company, MGM Distribution.

Sony had a minority stake in MGM, but otherwise MGM and UA operated under the direction of Stephen Cooper (CEO and minority owner of MGM).

==== United Artists Entertainment ====
On November 2, 2006, MGM announced that Tom Cruise and his long-time production partner Paula Wagner were resurrecting UA. This announcement came after the duo were released from a fourteen-year production relationship at Viacom-owned Paramount Pictures. Cruise, Wagner and MGM Studios created United Artists Entertainment LLC and the producer/actor and his partner owned a 30% stake in the studio, with the approval by MGM's consortium of owners. The deal gave them control over production and development. Wagner was named CEO, and was allotted an annual slate of four films with varying budget ranges, while Cruise served as a producer for the revamped studio and the occasional star.

UA became the first motion picture studio granted a Writers Guild of America, West (WGA) waiver in January 2008 during the Writers' Strike.

On August 14, 2008, MGM announced that Wagner would leave UA to produce films independently. Her output as head of UA was two films, both starring Cruise, Lions for Lambs and Valkyrie. Wagner's departure led to speculation that a UA overhaul was imminent.

Since then, UA has served as a co-producer with MGM for two releases: the 2009 remake of Fame and Hot Tub Time Machine—these are the last original films to date to bear the UA banner.

A 2011 financial report revealed that MGM reacquired its 100% stake in United Artists. MGM stated that it might continue to make new films under the UA brand. Currently, however, UA itself functions in-name-only, although it occasionally re-releases (via MGM) most of its films theatrically under the UA banner.

==== United Artists Media Group and United Artists Digital Studios ====
On September 22, 2014, MGM acquired a 55% interest in One Three Media and Lightworkers Media, both operated by Mark Burnett and Roma Downey and partly owned by Hearst Entertainment. The two companies were consolidated into a new television company, United Artists Media Group (UAMG), a revival of the UA brand. Burnett became UAMG's CEO and Downey became president of Lightworkers Media, the UAMG family and faith division. UAMG became the distributing studio for Mark Burnett Productions programming such as Survivor. UAMG was to form an over-the-top faith-based channel.

On December 14, 2015, MGM announced that it had acquired the remaining 45% stake of UAMG it did not already own and folded UAMG into its own television division. Hearst, Downey and Burnett received stakes in MGM collectively valued at $233 million. Additionally, Burnett was promoted to president for MGM Television, replacing the outgoing Roma Khanna. The planned over-the-top faith service (later to be branded as a combined OTT/digital subchannel service known as Light TV, now the TheGrio) became a separate entity owned by MGM, Burnett, Downey and Hearst.

On August 14, 2018, The Hollywood Reporter reported that MGM revived the brand as United Artists Digital Studios for the Stargate Origins web series as part of an attempted relaunch of its Stargate franchise which also included a dedicated streaming media platform known as Stargate Command, thus following in the footsteps of Paramount Global's CBS All Access platform (now Paramount+).

==== 2024–present: Revival ====
In July 2024, it was reported that Scott Stuber was nearing a deal to revive the United Artists label under Amazon MGM Studios for the first time in over a decade. Amazon confirmed the news shortly after in a press release, announcing that Stuber had entered a multi-year first look deal with the company. Under this deal, Stuber would produce films for the newly revived banner under his own company either for a theatrical release or streaming release through Amazon Prime Video. Stuber would also be involved with every film released under the United Artists banner.

== Film library ==
A majority of UA's post-1952 library is now owned by MGM, while the pre-1952 films (with few exceptions) were either sold to other companies such as National Telefilm Associates (now a part of the Melange/Republic Pictures holdings owned by Skydance, with Paramount Pictures handling their distribution) or are in the public domain. Films only distributed by United Artists are owned by their production companies. The MGM titles which UA distributed from 1973 to 1982, in addition to the Associated Artists Productions library, are now owned by Turner Entertainment Co.

=== Highest-grossing films ===
Highest-grossing films
Rank	Title	Year	Worldwide gross
1	Rain Man	1988	$354,825,435
2	GoldenEye	1995	$352,194,034
3	Tomorrow Never Dies	1997	$333,011,068
4	Rocky IV	1985	$300,473,716
5	Rocky III	1982	$270,000,000
6	Rocky	1976	$225,000,000
7	Moonraker	1979	$210,300,000
8	Valkyrie	2008	$201,545,517
9	Rocky II	1979	$200,182,160
10	The Living Daylights	1987	$191,199,996

== UA films on video ==
UA originally leased the home video rights to its films to Magnetic Video, the first home video company. Fox purchased Magnetic in 1981 and renamed it 20th Century-Fox Video that year. In 1982, 20th Century-Fox Video merged with CBS Video Enterprises (which earlier split from MGM/CBS Home Video after MGM merged with UA) giving birth to CBS/Fox Video. Although MGM owned UA around this time, UA's licensing deal with CBS/Fox (which also included sublabels Key Video and Playhouse Video) was still in effect. However, the newly renamed MGM/UA Home Video started releasing some UA product, including UA films originally released in the mid-1980s. Prior to MGM's purchase, UA licensed foreign video rights to Warner Bros. through Warner Home Video, in a deal that was set to expire in 1991. In 1986, the pre-1950 WB and the pre-May 1986 MGM film and television libraries were purchased by Ted Turner after his short-lived ownership of MGM/UA, and as a result CBS/Fox lost home video rights to the pre-1950 WB films to MGM/UA Home Video, which licensed them from Turner. When the deal with CBS/Fox (inherited from Magnetic Video) expired in 1989, the UA released films were released through MGM/UA Home Video.

Before the Magnetic Video and Warner Home Video deals in 1980, United Artists had exclusive rental contracts with a small video label called VidAmerica in the US, and another small label called Intervision Video in the UK. for the home video release of 20 titles from the UA library (e.g. The Great Escape, Some Like It Hot, and Hair, along with a few pre-1950 WB titles).

== United Artists Broadcasting ==
United Artists owned and operated two television stations under the "United Artists Broadcasting" name: WUAB in Cleveland, Ohio (nominally licensed to Lorain, Ohio) which the studio built and signed on in 1968, WRIK-TV in San Juan, Puerto Rico, which was purchased in 1969, and held a construction permit for a station in Houston, Texas. In 1970, United Artists purchased radio station WWSH in Philadelphia, Pennsylvania.

United Artists left the broadcasting business starting in 1977 by selling WUAB to the Gaylord Broadcasting Company and WWSH to Cox Enterprises, followed by WRIK-TV's sale to Tommy Muñiz in 1979.

== United Artists Releasing ==
United Artists Releasing, LLC (UAR) was a local film distribution joint venture between MGM and Annapurna Pictures founded by former MGM CEO Gary Barber and Annapurna founder Megan Ellison on 31 October 2017, it rebranded as United Artists Releasing on 5 February 2019 to commemorate 100 years since the founding of United Artists, it operated within with offices of the headquarters of the respective companies in West Hollywood and Los Angeles in California and offered alternative services to the major film studios and streaming media companies with 10–14 films released annually.

On 26 May 2021, online shopping and technology company Amazon acquired MGM Holdings, the parent company of MGM, for $8.45 billion which was completed on 17 March 2022 and consequentially placed United Artists Releasing under the control of Amazon Studios. Amazon then folded United Artists Releasing into MGM on 4 March 2023 in a push towards cinematic/theatrical film distribution alongside their staple media releases on their video on demand service Amazon Prime Video following the box-office success of Creed III.

== See also ==
- List of United Artists films
