= Michael Barker (film distributor) =

American film distributor

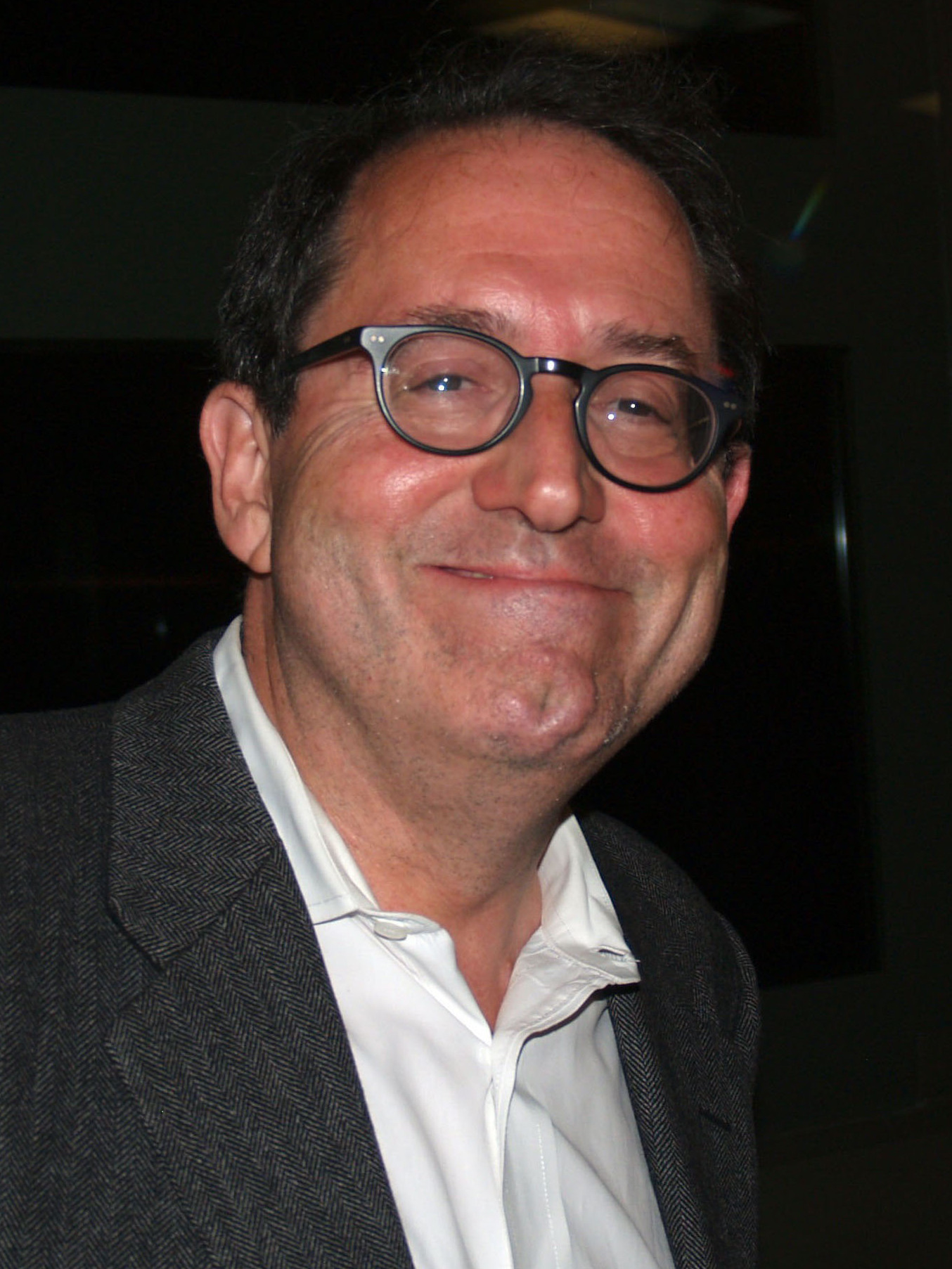
- Barker in 2016
- Born: 1954; Nuremberg, Germany
- Occupation: Film distributor
- Employer: Sony Pictures Classics

Michael Barker is an American film executive who has been co-president of Sony Pictures Classics (SPC) since 1992. Barker, Tom Bernard, and Marcie Bloom, after working together at Orion Classics, founded SPC in 1992 as co-presidents. Barker and Bernard have now been co-presidents of SPC for over 30 years, producing, acquiring and/or distributing over 400 films there.

== Education and early career ==
Born on an American Army base in Nuremberg, Germany, Barker arrived in Dallas, Texas, at age fourteen. He graduated from Kimball High School there in 1972. He was a Speech Communications major at UT Austin, where he channeled an early enthusiasm for film into running the film program at the Texas Student Events Center in the mid-1970s. This put him in contact with New York film studios and distributors. He moved to New York City and studied with Stella Adler. His first job was with Films Inc., initially handling the 16mm-film market for libraries and prisons.

== United Artists Classics (1980–1983) ==
At United Artists, Barker's first role was as head of non-theatrical distribution for the college market. During the 1970s, United Artists had undergone numerous realignments as its parent company, Transamerica Corporation, and the investors in UA's business partner MGM frequently changed strategies. In early 1978, five long-time executives had left United Artists, and announced, with Warner Communications, a new joint venture (soon to be named Orion Pictures) vested with broad autonomy and control over financing, production, and distribution. This opened up positions in a realigned classics unit, with Barker first serving as assistant regional sales manager, then taking a national role in 1982. Throughout the early 1980s, Barker teamed with Tom Bernard and Donna Gigliotti as UA's theatrical film unit. The first film released by them at United Artists Classics was Le Dernier Métro by François Truffaut.

== Orion Classics (1983–1992) ==
In April 1983, Orion Pictures formed a new unit headed by Bernard, Gigliotti and Barker. This division was very active over the next decade, building on strengths in distributing European films (Pauline à la plage by Éric Rohmer, Another Country by Marek Kanievska and Carmen by Carlos Saura) and expanding into distributing American films such as Strangers Kiss by Matthew Chapman. In 1989, with Orion Pictures in the midst of a long period of financial turmoil, Donna Gigliotti left and Marcie Bloom assumed a v.p. role. Barker, working with John Pierson, brought Richard Linklater's second feature-length film, Slacker (July 1990 Austin premiere), to Orion Pictures for a July 5, 1991 release. This film increased awareness of both Linklater and Austin, leading to a DVD release in 2004 within the Criterion Collection. Near the end of 1990, Orion Classics announced a deal for the Merchant Ivory Productions film Howards End, but Orion Pictures entered bankruptcy in December 1991. Early in 1992, it was reported that although Barker, Bernard and Bloom would continue to handle many ongoing Orion Classics film releases, Howards End was to be released through the newly-formed Sony Pictures Classics, under co-presidents Barker, Bernard and Bloom.

== Sony Pictures Classics (1992-present) ==
At the beginning of 1992, Sony Pictures Classics was formed. Barker, Bernard and Bloom served as co-presidents until 1996 when Bloom had a health setback. Their first release, Howards End, won the 1992 BAFTA Award for Best Film and was nominated for the Best Picture Oscar, using a nearly year-long "slow, slow rollout" while sending co-stars Helena Bonham Carter, Sam West and Emma Thompson, on multi-city publicity tours.

Crouching Tiger, Hidden Dragon is the film which generated the highest revenue for SPC, fueled by Oscar attention, major publicity and wide release before and after the Oscars. Barker described SPC's early publicity efforts, partially through cable TV,

In addition to these two films which were nominated for Best Picture Oscars, Barker and Bernard have released eight other Best-Picture-nominated films at Sony Pictures Classics: Capote, An Education, Midnight in Paris, Amour, Whiplash, Call Me by Your Name, The Father and I'm Still Here. In addition, Sony Pictures Classics has distributed five films which won the Oscar for Best Documentary Feature and 14 films, which won Oscars as Best Foreign Language Film.

Over the decades, Barker and Bernard have exhibited very similar skill sets, interests, and business philosophies; in fact, Barker compares their synergy to the "two halves of the brain that work together". However, they indicated to Ramin Setoodeh that there is at least some division of labor: "Barker is a whiz at organizational details, while Bernard handles crisis management."

== Honors and engagement ==
Barker, Bernard and Bloom were honored for their roles in championing independent films and filmmakers in 2000 by the Gotham Industry Lifetime Achievement Award and in 2002 by the Directors Guild of America.

In June 2014, Barker and Bernard received the LA Film Festival's Spirit of Independence Award. Also in 2014, Barker was named as a Knight (Chevalier) of France's Ordre national de la Légion d'honneur, as was Bernard, for dedication to presenting French cinema to American audiences. In 2017, Women in Film honored Barker and Bernard with their Beacon Award.

At the 2016 SXSW event, Barker was honored with membership in the Texas Film Hall of Fame for his support of Texas filmmakers and the Austin community. Barker serves on the Board of Trustees of the Museum of the Moving Image and became co-chairman of the board in 2015. Barker participates in film panels, including a discussion of women in film at the 2019 Cannes Film Festival and frequent appearances at the Roger Ebert Film Festival.
