= Patrick O'Connell (actor) =

Irish actor (1934–2017)

- O'Connell in 1976
- Born: 29 January 1934; Dublin, Ireland
- Died: 10 August 2017 (aged 83)
- Occupation: Actor
- Years active: 1957–1996
- Spouse: Patricia O'Connell

Patrick O’Connell (29 January 1934 – 10 August 2017) was an Irish actor. O'Connell began his acting career appearing in various films, such as the Brian Keith war movie, The McKenzie Break (1970), Cromwell (1970) and the Simon Rouse drama The Ragman's Daughter (1972). He also appeared in The Human Factor (1980) with Nicol Williamson and the drama Runners (1983) with Kate Hardie. He was also an artist known for his paintings, drawings, linocuts and etchings.

== Early life ==
Patrick O'Connell was born in Dublin, but was brought up in Birmingham, England, and after attending Birmingham Theatre School, he won a scholarship to train at Royal Academy of Dramatic Art (RADA).

== Theatre ==
His theatre work included: Stan Man in Arnold Wesker's Roots at the Belgrade, Coventry, the Royal Court and the Duke of York's (1959), Camille Desmoulins in Poor Bitos at the Duke of York's with Donald Pleasence (1963), created the role of Gunner O'Rouke in John McGrath's Events While Guarding the Bofors Gun at Hampstead Theatre (1966), US (an experimental play about the Vietnam War) with the RSC, directed by Peter Brook at the Aldwych (1966), Macduff to Paul Scofield's Macbeth directed by Peter Hall with the RSC, at Stratford and the Aldwych (1967), Kent in King Lear at the Young Vic (1981), McLeavy in Joe Orton's Loot with Leonard Rossiter at the Ambassador's and the Lyric, directed by Jonathan Lynn (March 1984 - Jan '85), and Henry IV in The Henrys with the ESC at The Old Vic, directed by Michael Bogdanov (1986).

== Television ==
His television work included Derek in the factory-set "Lena, O My Lena" by Alun Owen for Armchair Theatre directed by Ted Kotcheff (1960), Ashton in Doctor Who (The End of Tomorrow) directed by Richard Martin (1964), Nobby in "The Coming Out Party" for The Wednesday Play (1965), Guido in The Big Spender (1965–66), Nobby Clark / Willy / Dr. Lassiter in Dixon of Dock Green (1966 / 68 / 72), Rogers in The Saint (1967), Colour Sgt. O'Brien in the Thames TV series Frontier (1968), D.I Gamble in ATV's Fraud Squad (1968–70), Mick in Sling Your Hook for The Wednesday Play (1969), Martin Stewart in The Patriot Game by Dominic Behan, Thames TV directed by Piers Haggard (1969), Mallory in Callan (1970), O'Neill in Elizabeth R (1971), Ryder in The Persuaders (1971), Reagan in The Protectors (1972), Edward Hammond in BBC TV series, The Brothers (1972–77), Manton in The Professionals (1980), Dan Glover in Enemy at the Door (1980), Jack Blair in LWT's 13-episode series of We'll Meet Again (1982), Brian Wilkinson in Yes, Minister (1982), Harry Hopwood in The Bill (1989 / 91), Jack Vaizey in Inspector Morse (1993), Gerard in Peak Practice (1993), James White in Casualty (1994), and John Callard in Dangerfield (1995).

== Selected filmography ==
Year	Title	Role	Notes
1960	Armchair Theatre	Derk	Episode: "Lena, O My Lena"
1962	Z-Cars	Mate	Episode: "Day Trip"
1964	Doctor Who	Ashton	Episode: "The End of Tomorrow"
1964	The Human Jungle	Coalman	Episode: "The Man Who Fell Apart"
1965	The Wednesday Play	Nobby	Episode: "The Coming Out Party"
1965 - 1966	The Big Spender	Guido	5 episodes
1966	Adam Adamant Lives!	Danny	Episode: "Death Has a Thousand Faces"
1966	Dixon of Dock Green	Nobby Clark	Episode: "Death of a Donkeyman"
1966	Redcap	Sgt. Collins	Episode: "The Moneylenders"
1967	The Saint	Rogers	Episode: "The Persistent Patriots"
1968	Dixon of Dock Green	Willy	Episode: "The Man"
1968	Frontier	Colour Sgt. O'Brien	8 episodes
1969	ITV Playhouse	Martin Stewart	Episode: "The Patriot Game"
1969	Strange Report	Jago	Episode: "REPORT 4977 SWINDLE 'Square Root of Evil"
1969	The Wednesday Play	Mick	Episode: "Sling Your Hook"
1969 - 1970	Fraud Squad	Dept. Insp. Grimble	26 episodes
1970	Callan	Mallory	Episode: "The Same Trick Twice"
1970	Cromwell	John Lilburne	Film
1970	The McKenzie Break	Sgt. Maj. Cox	Film
1971	Elizabeth R	O'Neill	Episode: "Sweet England's Pride"
1971	Owen, M.D.	Bill Rees	2 episodes
1971	The Persuaders!	Ryder	Episode: "The Time and the Place"
1971	The Rivals of Sherlock Holmes	The Captain	Episode: "The Missing Witness Sensation"
1972	Dixon of Dock Green	Dr. Lassiter	Episode: "The Specialist"
1972	New Scotland Yard	George Rennell	Episode: "Hard Contract"
1972	The Protectors	Reagan	Episode: "A Kind of Wild Justice"
1972	The Ragman's Daughter	Tony, 35 yrs	Film
1972	Softly, Softly: Task Force	Asst. Chief Constable Morton	Episode: "On the Third Day"
1973	The Flaxton Boys	Alf	Episode: "1945: It Fell off the Back of a Lorry"
1973 - 1976	The Brothers	Edward Hammond	82 episodes
1978	Mind Your Language	Albert Collins	Episode: "Brief Re-Encounter"
1979	The Human Factor	Reader	Film
1979	Kids	Tom Brooke	2 episodes
1980	Enemy at the Door	Dan Glover	Episode: "From a View of Death"
1980	The Professionals	Manton	Episode: "Need to Know"
1982	Spaghetti House	Mallory	Film
1982	Yes, Minister	Brian Wilkinson	Episode: "The Middle Class Rip-Off"
1982	We'll Meet Again	Jack Blain	13 episodes (mini-series)
1983	Runners	The Hostel - Warden	Film
1985	The Shooting Party	Charlie Lyne	Film
1986	Nanou	Nanou's father	Film
1989 - 1991	The Bill	Harry Hopwood	2 episodes
1990	Eurocops	Campbell	Episode: "Pushed"
1990	She Wolf of London	Dave McDonnell	Episode: "Little Bookshop of Horrors"
1992	Fool's Fire	Minister Bacci	TV movie
1992	Perfect Scounderls	Todd	Episode: "The Long Way Home"
1993	Inspector Morse	Jack Vaizey	Episode: "The Day of the Devil"
1993	Peak Practice	Gerard	Episode: "Roses Around the Corner"
1994	Casualty	James White	Episode: "Tippers"
1995	Dangerfield	John Callard	Episode: "Down By the Riverside"
1996	As Time Goes By	Landlord	Episode: "Showered with Gifts"
