= L.A. Story =

1991 film by Mick Jackson

- Theatrical release poster
- Directed by: Mick Jackson
- Written by: Steve Martin
- Produced by: Daniel Melnick; Michael Rachmil
- Starring: Steve Martin; Victoria Tennant; Richard E. Grant; Marilu Henner
- Cinematography: Andrew Dunn
- Edited by: Richard A. Harris; Greg Le Duc
- Music by: Peter Melnick
- Production company: Carolco Pictures
- Distributed by: Tri-Star Pictures
- Release date: February 8, 1991
- Running time: 98 minutes
- Country: United States
- Language: English
- Box office: $28.9 million

L.A. Story is a 1991 American satirical romantic comedy film written by and starring Steve Martin and directed by Mick Jackson. The film also stars Victoria Tennant, Richard E. Grant, and Marilu Henner. Inspired by elements from Shakespearean plays, in particular A Midsummer Night's Dream and The Tempest, the plot follows a weatherman (Martin) trying to find love in Los Angeles. It was released by Tri-Star Pictures in the United States on February 8, 1991, and received generally positive reviews from critics.

== Plot ==
Harris K. Telemacher is a television weatherman living in Los Angeles. He is in a dead-end relationship with his social-climbing girlfriend Trudi and feels his job requires him to be undignified and unintellectual, though he holds a Ph.D. in arts and humanities. He wants to find meaning and magic in his life, having grown increasingly weary of what he sees as the rather shallow and superficial city of L.A., from overly pretentious coffee orders to bizarre shooting etiquette rules on the freeway. Furthermore, he spends his time roller-skating through art galleries with his friend Ariel, offering eccentric art reviews to acquaintances, remixing Shakespeare a lot, and otherwise seeking to escape his ordinary life.

At a luncheon with friends, Harris meets Sara, a journalist from London, with whom he immediately becomes infatuated. Driving home that night, his car breaks down on the freeway. He notices that a freeway traffic condition sign seems to be displaying messages intended solely for him. It offers him cryptic advice on his love life throughout the movie.

Harris begins to fall for Sara, but she is conflicted because she has pledged to reconcile with her ex-husband, Roland. Feeling that a relationship with Sara is unlikely, Harris begins dating SanDeE*, a ditzy aspiring spokesmodel, whom he meets at a clothing store. After his first date with her, Harris discovers Trudi has been cheating on him (with his agent) for three years. This leads him to pursue his romantic interest in Sara, which is complicated by his new relationship with SanDeE* and by Sara's feeling of obligation to Roland.

As the movie concludes, Harris has successfully wooed Sara – with encouragement and advice from the freeway sign.

== Cast ==
- Steve Martin as Harris K. Telemacher
- Victoria Tennant as Sara McDowell
- Richard E. Grant as Roland Mackey
- Marilu Henner as Trudi
- Sarah Jessica Parker as SanDeE*
- Susan Forristal as Ariel
- Kevin Pollak as Frank Swan
- Sam McMurray as Morris Frost
- Patrick Stewart as Maitre d' at L'Idiot
- Iman as Cynthia

There are uncredited cameo appearances by Chevy Chase, Woody Harrelson, Paula Abdul, Martin Lawrence, Rick Moranis, and Terry Jones. John Lithgow and Scott Bakula filmed scenes—as a movie agent and Harris's neighbor, respectively—that did not appear in the final cut (although references to Lithgow's character remain in the freeway shootout and the "California Cuisine" lunch scenes). Martin and Tennant were real-life husband and wife at the time of the film's production.

== Release ==
=== Box office ===
L.A. Story was a box office success. The film earned $6.6 million during its opening weekend, and ended its theatrical run with a gross of $28 million.

== Reception ==
On review aggregator website Rotten Tomatoes, the film holds an approval rating of 91% based on 44 reviews, with an average rating of 7.50/10. The site's critical consensus reads, "A romantic comedy that doubles as a love letter to the titular city, L.A. Story is Steve Martin at his silly, sweetly soulful best." On Metacritic, the film has a weighted average score of 66 out of 100, based on 11 critics, indicating "generally favorable" reviews. Audiences polled by CinemaScore gave the film an average grade of "B" on an A+ to F scale.

In 2008, L.A. Story was voted by a group of Los Angeles Times writers and editors as the 20th best film set in Los Angeles in the last 25 years—with two criteria: "The movie had to communicate some inherent truth about the L.A. experience, and only one film per director was allowed on the list".
