= The Ragman's Daughter =

- Theatrical release poster
- Directed by: Harold Becker
- Written by: Alan Sillitoe
- Produced by: Harold Becker; Souter Harris; Steve Previn
- Starring: Simon Rouse; Victoria Tennant
- Cinematography: Michael Seresin
- Edited by: Antony Gibbs
- Music by: Kenny Clayton
- Production company: Harpoon Films
- Distributed by: Twentieth Century Fox (UK); Penelope Films (USA)
- Release date: 1972
- Running time: 94 minutes
- Country: United Kingdom
- Language: English

The Ragman's Daughter is a 1972 British romantic crime–drama film directed by Harold Becker and adapted by Alan Sillitoe from his short story of the same name. It was Becker's first film during the 1970s and stars Simon Rouse and, in her screen debut, Victoria Tennant. The film tells the story of the ill-fated love between Tony, a petty thief from a working-class family, and Doris, the daughter of an upwardly mobile scrap dealer.

== Plot ==
Middle-aged Tony Bradmore privately thinks back on his wild youth and his love affair with Doris Randall. Tony's memories are interspersed with scenes from his current life as a cheese factory worker.

The young Tony is unemployed and lives with his working-class parents in a poor neighbourhood of crumbling terraces (rowhouses). He commits petty thefts and burglaries partly as a way of getting money and other items he wants, but also partly for the thrill of it. It is implied that his friends engage in similar behaviour and that theft is viewed as a way of getting by in an area perceived to have few economic opportunities. While hanging out with his friends at a local fish and chip shop, he meets the beautiful blonde Doris, whose dress and manner show that she is from a higher social class than Tony, his family and friends. Doris' father, a prosperous scrap merchant, originally came from Tony's neighbourhood, but due to his shrewd and sometimes dishonest business skills, he made enough money to move his family to a large, detached house in a nicer area. As a result of her father's money, Doris has nice clothes and her own horse, does not have to work, and attends an expensive school. Doris' father wants her to carry on his upward mobility by socialising with well-off young people and attending university, but due to her family background, Doris is uncomfortable with these expectations. She is instead drawn to Tony and the "kicks" they enjoy when spending time together, including riding on Tony's motorcycle and having sex. Doris' father disapproves of Tony, thinking Doris can and should do better, and tries to thwart the relationship.

Tony soon falls in love with Doris, and tries to convince her to run away with him, but Doris refuses. Instead, she encourages Tony to commit more burglaries and take her along, even after they are nearly caught in the act. The couple eventually burgle a shoe shop, during which Doris increases the risk on purpose by turning on lights and encouraging Tony to remain in the shop instead of leaving quickly. The police arrive and pursue Doris and Tony, who initially escape, but Tony in his haste leaves behind evidence that is traced to him. He is arrested and sent to borstal, ending his relationship with Doris. Upon being released, he learns that he had made Doris pregnant, and that she married another man before having the child. Doris and her husband were then killed when the motorcycle they were riding crashed. Doris' parents adopted her son. Denied contact with the child he fathered, Tony steals a radio in broad daylight on a busy street and is quickly apprehended.

The middle-aged Tony continues his pattern of theft by stealing cheese from his employer. He takes the cheese home to his working-class wife and young sons, with whom he has a loving relationship. Tony is caught with stolen cheese when police wrongly suspect him of a major bank robbery and search his bag. The police inform Tony's manager at the cheese factory, who sacks Tony but declines to press any charges. Tony's wife, although slightly frustrated, is supportive of him, although he does not let her know that he has been thinking of Doris all day. Tony reassures his wife that he can probably get a new job with the butcher.

== Cast ==
- Simon Rouse as Tony Bradmore
- Victoria Tennant as Doris Randall
- Patrick O'Connell as Tony, aged 35 yrs
- Jane Wood as Tony's Wife
- Leslie Sands as Doris' father
- Rita Howard as Doris' mother
- Brenda Peters as Tony's mother
- Brian Murphy as Tony's father
- Kevin Richmond as Paul
- Reginald Marsh as George
- Peter Attard as Pete
- Steve Hatton as Alf
- John McEnery as Old man in wagon
- Donald Webster as Jack
- Gareth Thomas as Tom
- John Malcolm as Factory Manager

== See also ==
- List of British films of 1972
