= End of the Line (1987 film) =

1987 film by Jay Russell

- Film poster
- Directed by: Jay Russell
- Written by: Jay Russell; John Wohlbruck
- Produced by: Lewis M. Allen; Peter Newman; Mary Steenburgen
- Starring: Wilford Brimley; Levon Helm; Kevin Bacon; Holly Hunter
- Cinematography: George Tirl
- Edited by: Mercedes Danevic
- Music by: Andy Summers
- Distributed by: Orion Classics
- Release date: August 28, 1987
- Running time: 103 minutes
- Country: United States
- Language: English
- Budget: $3 million
- Box office: $42,000

End of the Line is a 1987 American drama film directed by Jay Russell in his directorial debut. Produced by Lewis M. Allen, Peter Newman and Mary Steenburgen, the film was shot in Arkansas.

== Plot ==
Leo Pickett and Will Haney, railroad workers in Clifford, a fictional town in Arkansas, find out the parent company of the Southland railroad is about to close their yard and lay off the employees, switching all future shipments to the air freight business.

In a last-ditch effort to save their jobs, the two men "borrow" a locomotive and drive it to Chicago to make their case to Thomas G. Clinton, the railroad's chairman of the board.

== Cast ==
- Wilford Brimley as Will Haney
- Levon Helm as Leo Pickett
- Kevin Bacon as Everett
- Holly Hunter as Charlotte Haney
- Mary Steenburgen as Rose Pickett
- Michael Beach as Alvin
- Bob Balaban as Warren Gerber
- Barbara Barrie as Jean Haney
- Clint Howard as Les Sullivan
- Bruce McGill as Billy Haney
- Howard Morris as a Tramp
- Trey Wilson as Sheriff Maxie Howell
- Henderson Forsythe as Thomas Clinton
- Sarah Vowell as Diner Waitress (uncredited)

== Production ==
End of the Line was produced with the cooperation of the Missouri Pacific Railroad, which provided technical assistance to production crews as well as the contribution of multiple sets of rolling stock and locomotives. All Southland rolling stock and locomotives, including trackage rights for filming rights was provided by the Missouri Pacific, as well as limited assistance by the Union Pacific, which approved use of some rolling stock, trackage, and locomotives for completion of the film.

== Release ==
End of the line was released August 28th, 1987, by Orion Classics. Its opening weekend grossed $25,000. End of the line grossed $42,000 worldwide.

=== Home media ===
End of the line was released on DVD on January 7, 2003, by Orion Classics.

== Reception ==
Review aggregator Rotten Tomatoes End of the line a 60% rating based on five reviews indicating mixed reviews.

=== Critical response ===
Roger Ebert of the Chicago Sun Times wrote in his review: "“End of the Line” is a movie that belongs in more innocent times. It would have made a heartwarming fantasy for the 1930s, maybe as the second half of a double bill with My Man Godfrey, the comedy about the “forgotten men” of the Depression. But the forgotten men of this film live in crueler and more cynical times, and it almost was impossible for me to believe in them, try as I would. Janet Maslin of The New York Times wrote in her review: "There is a moment when End of the Line looks like a small miracle. However, that moment is extremely brief, and it occurs during the film's opening credits; no such impression ever comes again. Here in the cast of this unprepossessing small-town story are such singular actors as Mary Steenburgen, Holly Hunter, Kevin Bacon and Levon Helm, whose presence alone ought to be enough to hold the interest."
