= The Handmaid's Tale (film) =

1990 film by Volker Schlöndorff

- Theatrical release poster
- Directed by: Volker Schlöndorff
- Screenplay by: Harold Pinter
- Based on: The Handmaid's Tale (1985 novel) by Margaret Atwood
- Produced by: Daniel Wilson
- Starring: Natasha Richardson; Faye Dunaway; Aidan Quinn; Elizabeth McGovern; Victoria Tennant; Robert Duvall
- Cinematography: Igor Luther
- Edited by: David Ray
- Music by: Ryuichi Sakamoto
- Production companies: Bioskop Film; Cinecom Entertainment Group; Cinétudes Films; Daniel Wilson Productions; Master Partners; Odyssey Distributors
- Distributed by: Cinecom
- Release dates: February 15, 1990 (West Germany); March 9, 1990 (U.S.)
- Running time: 109 minutes
- Countries: United States; West Germany
- Language: English
- Box office: $4,960,385

The Handmaid's Tale is a 1990 dystopian drama film directed by Volker Schlöndorff, adapted by Harold Pinter from Margaret Atwood's 1985 novel. It stars Natasha Richardson (Offred), Faye Dunaway (Serena Joy), Robert Duvall (The Commander), Aidan Quinn (Nick), and Elizabeth McGovern (Moira). The original music score was composed by Ryuichi Sakamoto. It is the first filmed adaptation of the novel, succeeded by the Hulu television series which began streaming in 2017.

The film adaptation of The Handmaid's Tale faced numerous challenges in its development, with screenwriter Harold Pinter expressing dissatisfaction with the final product due to significant alterations from his original script. Pinter had contributed only part of the screenplay and ultimately gave the director and author carte blanche to make changes. He tried to have his name removed from the credits but was unsuccessful.

The film was entered into the 40th Berlin International Film Festival. Its reception was lukewarm, with critics expressing uncertainty about the movie's message and themes.

== Plot ==
In the early 21st century following a sterility plague caused by global warming, war rages across the Republic of Gilead (formerly the United States of America, which collapsed after a civil war between Fascists and Radical Feminists), and rampant pollution has rendered 99% of the population sterile and killed most children. Kate is a woman who attempts to emigrate to Canada with her husband Luke and daughter Jill. As they attempt to cross the border by foot on a dirt road, the Gilead Border Guard orders them to turn back or they will open fire. Luke draws their fire, telling Kate to run, and is shot and killed. Kate is captured, while Jill wanders off into the back country, confused and unaccompanied. The authorities take Kate to a training facility with several other women, where the women are trained to become Handmaids, who are concubines for the privileged but barren couples who run the country's religious fundamentalist regime. Although she resists indoctrination into the cult of the Handmaids, which mixes Old Testament orthodoxy with scripted group chanting and ritualized violence, Kate is soon assigned to the home of "the Commander" (Fred) and his cold, inflexible wife, Serena Joy. There she is named "Offred" ("of Fred").

Her role as the Fred's latest concubine is emotionless, as she lies between Serena Joy's legs while the Commander brutally and violently rapes her, the couple hoping that she will bear them a child. Kate continually longs for her earlier life, but nightmares of her husband's death and her daughter's disappearance haunt her. A doctor explains that many of Gilead's male leaders are as sterile as their wives, and that a secret organisation funded by the soviets is attempting to find a way to stop the impending extinction of humanity. Desperately wanting a baby, Serena Joy persuades Kate to risk the punishment for fornication (death by hanging) in order to be fertilized by another man who may impregnate her and consequently spare her life. When Kate agrees to this, Serena Joy informs Kate that her daughter Jill is alive, and provides a recent photograph of her living in another commander's household, but tells Kate she can never see her daughter. Fred also tries to get closer to Kate, sensing that if she enjoyed herself more she would become a better handmaid. Exploiting Kate's background as a librarian, he gets her hard-to-obtain items and allows her into his private library. However, during a night out, Fred has sex with Kate in an unauthorized manner. The other man selected by Serena Joy turns out to be Nick, Fred's sympathetic chauffeur. Kate grows attached to Nick and eventually becomes pregnant with his child.

Kate ultimately kills Fred, and a police unit then arrives to take her away. Believing the policemen are members of the Eyes, the government's secret police, she soon realizes that they are soldiers from the USSR-backed resistance movement (Mayday), of which Nick is also a part. Kate then flees with them, parting from Nick in an emotional scene.

Now free once again and wearing non-uniform clothes, but facing an uncertain future, a pregnant Kate is living by herself in a trailer while receiving intelligence reports from the rebels. Wondering if – and hoping that – she and Nick will be reunited, she resolves, with the rebels' help, to find her daughter.

== Cast ==
- Natasha Richardson as Kate / Offred
- Robert Duvall as Fred Waterford, The Commander
- Faye Dunaway as Serena Joy
- Elizabeth McGovern as Moira
- Aidan Quinn as Nick
- Victoria Tennant as Aunt Lydia
- Blanche Baker as Ofglen
- Traci Lind as Janine/Ofwarren
- Reiner Schöne as Luke, Kate's husband
- Robert D. Raiford as Dick
- Muse Watson as Guardian
- Bill Owen as TV Announcer
- David Dukes as Doctor
- Blair Nicole Struble as Jill, Kate's daughter

== Development ==
=== Writing ===
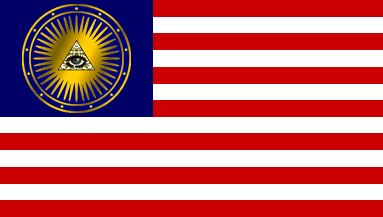
Flag of the Republic of Gilead as shown in the film

According to Steven H. Gale, in his book Sharp Cut, "the final cut of The Handmaid's Tale is less a result of Pinter's script than any of his other films. He contributed only part of the screenplay: reportedly he "abandoned writing the screenplay from exhaustion. ... Although he tried to have his name removed from the credits because he was so displeased with the movie (in 1994 he told me that this was due to the great divergences from his script that occur in the movie), ... his name remains as screenwriter".

Gale observes further that "while the film was being shot, director Volker Schlöndorff", who had replaced the original director Karel Reisz, "called Pinter and asked for some changes in the script"; however, "Pinter recall[ed] being very tired at the time, and he suggested that Schlöndorff contact Atwood about the rewrites. He essentially gave the director and author carte blanche to accept whatever changes that she wanted to institute, for, as he reasoned, 'I didn't think an author would want to fuck up her own work.' ... As it turned out, not only did Atwood make changes, but so did many others who were involved in the shoot". Gale wrote that Pinter told his biographer Michael Billington that:

It became ... a hotchpotch. The whole thing fell between several shoots. I worked with Karel Reisz on it for about a year. There are big public scenes in the story and Karel wanted to do them with thousands of people. The film company wouldn't sanction that so he withdrew. At which point, Volker Schlöndorff came into it as director. He wanted to work with me on the script, but I said I was absolutely exhausted. I more or less said, "Do what you like. There's the script. Why not go back to the original author if you want to fiddle about?" He did go to the original author. And then the actors came into it. I left my name on the film because there was enough there to warrant it—just about. But it's not mine.

In an essay on Pinter's screenplay for The French Lieutenant's Woman, in The Films of Harold Pinter, Gale discusses Pinter's "dissatisfaction with" the "kind of alteration" that occurs "once the script is tinkered with by others" and "it becomes collaborative to the point that it is not his product any more or that such tinkering for practical purposes removes some of the artistic element"; he added: "Most notably The Handmaid's Tale, which he considered so much altered that he has refused to allow the script to be published, and The Remains of the Day, which he refused to allow his name to be attached to for the same reason ..."

==== Pinter's screenplay ====
Christopher C. Hudgins discussed further details about why "Pinter elected not to publish three of his completed filmscripts, The Handmaid's Tale, The Remains of the Day and Lolita", all of which Hudgins considered "masterful filmscripts" of "demonstrable superiority to the shooting scripts that were eventually used to make the films"; fortunately ("We can thank our various lucky stars"), he says, "these Pinter filmscripts are now available not only in private collections but also in the Pinter Archive at the British Library." In this essay, which he first presented as a paper at the 10th Europe Theatre Prize symposium, Pinter: Passion, Poetry, Politics, held in Turin, Italy, in March 2006, Hudgins "examin[es] all three unpublished filmscripts in conjunction with one another" and "provides several interesting insights about Pinter's adaptation process". Pinter reportedly wanted avoid using a voice-over in the film.

==== Richardson's views ====
In a retrospective account written after Natasha Richardson's death, for CanWest News Service, Jamie Portman cited Richardson's view of the difficulties involved with making Atwood's novel into a film script:

Richardson recognized early on the difficulties in making a film out of a book which was "so much a one-woman interior monologue" and with the challenge of playing a woman unable to convey her feelings to the world about her, but who must make them evident to the audience watching the movie. ... She thought the passages of voice-over narration in the original screenplay would solve the problem, but then Pinter changed his mind and Richardson felt she had been cast adrift. ... "Harold Pinter has something specific against voice-overs", she said angrily 19 years ago. "Speaking as a member of an audience, I've seen voice-over and narration work very well in films a number of times, and I think it would have been helpful had it been there for The Handmaid's Tale. After all it's HER story."

Portman concludes that "In the end director Volker Schlöndorff sided with Richardson". Portman does not acknowledge Pinter's already-quoted account that he gave both Schlöndorff and Atwood carte blanche to make whatever changes they wanted to his script because he was too "exhausted" from the experience to work further on it. In 1990, when she reportedly made her comments quoted by Portman, Richardson herself may not have known that.

The novel does not include the murder of the Commander, and Kate's fate is left completely unresolved—the van waits in the driveway, "and so I step up, into the darkness within; or else the light". The escape to Canada and the reappearance of the child and Nick are Pinter's inventions for the movie version. As shot, there is a voice-over in which Kate explains (accompanied by light symphonic music that contrasts with that of the opening scene) that she is now safe in the mountains held by the rebels. Bolstered by occasional messages from Nick, she awaits the birth of her baby while she dreams about Jill, whom she feels she is going to find eventually.

=== Filming locations ===
The scene where the hanging occurred was filmed in front of Duke Chapel on the campus of Duke University in Durham, North Carolina. Several scenes were filmed at Saint Mary's School (Raleigh, North Carolina). 'The Staircase' was used for this film and the Patterson house as a location.

== Reception ==
On the review aggregator website Rotten Tomatoes, 35% of 23 critics' reviews are positive, with an average rating of 4.8/10. Metacritic, which uses a weighted average, assigned the film a score of 53 out of 100, based on 24 critics, indicating "mixed or average" reviews. Roger Ebert gave the film two out of four stars and wrote that he was "not sure exactly what the movie is saying" and that by "the end of the movie we are conscious of large themes and deep thoughts, and of good intentions drifting out of focus." Owen Gleiberman, writing for Entertainment Weekly, gave the film a "C−" grade and commented that "visually, it's quite striking", but that it is "paranoid poppycock – just like the book". John Simon of the conservative National Review called The Handmaid's Tale "inept and annoying".
