= Bar Girls =

- Theatrical release poster
- Directed by: Marita Giovanni
- Written by: Lauran Hoffman (based on her play)
- Produced by: Marita Giovanni; Lauran Hoffman
- Starring: Nancy Allison Wolfe; Liza D'Agostino; Camila Griggs; Michael Harris
- Cinematography: Michael Ferris
- Edited by: Carter DeHaven
- Music by: Lanny Meyers
- Distributed by: Orion Classics
- Release date: September 15, 1994 (Toronto International Film Festival)
- Running time: 95 minutes
- Country: United States
- Language: English
- Budget: $500,000 (estimated)
- Box office: $573,953 (US)

Bar Girls is a 1994 American lesbian-themed romantic comedy film written by Lauran Hoffman, adapted by Hoffman from her stage play of the same name for the screen in the same year. Starring Nancy Allison Wolfe, Liza D'Agostino, Camila Griggs and Michael Harris and directed by Marita Giovanni.

== Premise ==
The film follows the lives of several gay women in the Los Angeles area who socialize at a local lesbian bar called Girl Bar.

== Cast ==
- Nancy Allison Wolfe as Loretta
- Liza D'Agostino as Rachel
- Camila Griggs as J.R.
- Michael Harris as Noah
- Justine Slater as Veronica
- Lisa Parker as Annie
- Pam Raines as Celia
- Paula Sorge as Tracy
- Cece Tsou as Sandy
- Caitlin Stansbury as Kimba
- Patti Sheehan as Destiny
- Lee Everett as Lee
- Betsy Burke as Cafe Waitress
- Laurie Jones as Laurie
- Chaz Bono (credited as Chastity Bono) as Scorp'

== Reception ==
On Rotten Tomatoes the film has an approval rating of 25% based on reviews from 8 critics.

Entertainment Weekly wrote in its review, "A chic girl-meets-girl movie for people who thought the women in Go Fish looked too damn geeky. The eight pretty patrons at the L.A. bar in this upbeat romantic rondelet change partners easily (always wearing nice makeup), pairing off and then recombining like residents of Melrose Place."

== Home media ==
Bar Girls was released on Region 1 DVD on March 19, 2002.
