= Ladder 49 =

- Theatrical release poster
- Directed by: Jay Russell
- Written by: Lewis Colick
- Produced by: Casey Silver
- Starring: Joaquin Phoenix; John Travolta; Morris Chestnut; Robert Patrick; Balthazar Getty; Jay Hernandez; Jacinda Barrett
- Cinematography: James L. Carter
- Edited by: Bud S. Smith; M. Scott Smith
- Music by: William Ross
- Production companies: Touchstone Pictures; Beacon Pictures; Casey Silver Productions
- Distributed by: Buena Vista Pictures Distribution
- Release date: October 1, 2004
- Running time: 115 minutes
- Country: United States
- Language: English
- Budget: $50 million
- Box office: $102.3 million

Ladder 49 is a 2004 American disaster thriller film directed by Jay Russell and written by Lewis Colick. The film follows Baltimore firefighter Jack Morrison, who is trapped inside a warehouse fire, and his recollection of the events that got him to that point. The film stars Joaquin Phoenix and John Travolta, and was released on October 1, 2004 by Buena Vista Pictures Distribution. It received mixed reviews and grossed $102.3 million worldwide on $50 million budget.

== Plot ==
Baltimore City firefighter Jack Morrison saves a man's life in a massive four-alarm fire in a 20-story concrete grain elevator/warehouse in the Canton waterfront neighborhood of Baltimore, Maryland. However, the grain stored in the warehouse explodes causing Jack to fall through several floors and break his leg. The film follows the efforts of the other men in his unit, Ladder Company 49, led by the commands of Deputy Chief Mike Kennedy, Jack's mentor, to rescue him while Morrison tries to reach a safe area of the burning structure. Interspersed with the rescue efforts are a series of flashbacks showing how Jack joined the fire department, his first meeting with the woman who became his wife, his relationship with his children, and the bonds he formed and the trials and tribulations he endured with his fellow firefighters.

After graduating from the fire academy, Jack is sent to work on Baltimore City Fire Department (BCFD) Engine Company 33 in the busiest firehouse in the city. Quartered with Engine 33 is Ladder Company 49. On Engine 33, Jack learns the ropes of firefighting. He becomes close friends with his fellow firefighters, including Mike, his Captain. Jack's first fire takes place at a burning vacant rowhouse. Jack and Mike enter the building with a hose line and tackle the blaze, quickly extinguishing it.

After some time working on Engine 33, Jack arrives at the scene of another vacant rowhouse fire, where a fellow firefighter from Ladder 49, Dennis Gauquin, dies after falling through the roof of a building. Numerous firefighters attend his funeral. Jack decides to take his late friend's more dangerous position as a "truckie", a search and rescue member on Ladder 49 by transferring to the Truck.

As the years go by, Jack suffers traumatic experiences from rescuing a man from the ledge of a burning high-rise building in Downtown Baltimore and witnessing another friend and fellow firefighter from Ladder 49, Tommy Drake, suffer severe burns following a steam explosion at an industrial building. He finds the work rewarding, but his wife worries about his safety and opposes the change. However, she eventually accepts his new role and talks him out of taking an administrative position.

One Christmas Eve, Jack and the members of Engine 33 and Ladder 49 respond to a burning apartment building. Jack rescues a young girl but is briefly trapped himself before being rescued by a fellow Firefighter from Ladder 49, Leonard "Lenny" Richter. Both men receive the department's Medal of Valor.

Back at the grain building fire that opened the film, Jack reaches the only possible safe area. However, the exit is cut off by raging flames. He radios Mike to pull his men back so that no one else gets killed or hurt while trying to rescue him, which devastates Mike, who reluctantly orders the remaining firefighters to evacuate the building.

At Jack's funeral, Mike delivers an emotional eulogy, which receives a standing ovation. Jack's body is then borne to its resting place with full honors, on the back of Engine 33 in a classic fireman's funeral procession. The final scene has Mike and company en route to a call while he flashes back to Jack and his companion firefighters rushing to fires, then the final shot of Mike and Jack emerging from Jack's first-ever burning building in triumph.

== Cast ==
- Joaquin Phoenix as Firefighter Jack Morrison, Ladder Company 49 (formerly Engine Company 33)
- John Travolta as Deputy Chief (formerly Captain) Mike Kennedy, Deputy Chief 1 (formerly Engine Company 33)
- Jacinda Barrett as Linda Morrison, Jack's wife
- Morris Chestnut as Firefighter Tommy Drake, Ladder Company 49 Tillerman
- Balthazar Getty as Firefighter Ray Gauquin, Ladder Company 49, Dennis's younger brother
- Robert Patrick as Firefighter Leonard "Lenny" Richter, Ladder Company 49
- Billy Burke as Firefighter Dennis Gauquin, Ladder Company 49, Ray's older brother.
- Tim Guinee as Captain Tony Corrigan, Ladder Company 49, who replaces Mike after his promotion to Deputy Chief.
- Kevin Chapman as Lieutenant (formerly Firefighter) Frank McKinney, Engine Company 33
- Jay Hernandez as Probationary Firefighter Keith Perez, Engine Company 33
- Kevin Daniels as Firefighter Engineer Don Miller, Engine Company 33
- Steve Maye as Firefighter Pete Lamb, Engine Company 33
- Robert Logan Lewis as Firefighter Ed Reilly, Ladder Company 49
- Spencer Berglund as Nicky Morrison, Jack and Linda's son
- Brooke Hamlin as Katie Morrison, Jack and Linda's daughter
- Sam Stockdale as Himself
- Paul Novak Jr. as the Voice of Ladder 49, The Dispatcher – with a deep, sensual baritone
- Mayor of Baltimore Martin O'Malley as himself

== Production ==
In October 2002, it was reported that Jay Russell was developing and in negotiations to direct Ladder 49 for Walt Disney Studios Motion Pictures and producer Casey Silver, a script by Lewis Colick that follows a veteran firefighter who, while trapped in what could be the fire that will kill him, looks back on his personal and professional life that brought him to this point. In January 2003, it was reported that John Travolta was in negotiations to star alongside Joaquin Phoenix in the film after passing on starring in Mr. 3000.

== Songs ==
Robbie Robertson contributed the film's theme song, "Shine Your Light". He also composed an adagio for the end credits. The film also features "Love Sneakin' Up On You" by Bonnie Raitt, among others.

== Release ==
=== Home media ===
Ladder 49 was released on VHS and DVD on March 8, 2005 by Buena Vista Home Entertainment (under the Touchstone Home Entertainment label). A Blu-ray version was released on February 13, 2007. A new Blu-ray was released on January 13, 2026 by Sony Pictures Home Entertainment.

== Reception ==
Ladder 49 grossed $74,463,263 at the US box office and $102,332,848 worldwide.

=== Critical response ===
On review aggregator Rotten Tomatoes, the film has an approval rating of 41% based on 164 reviews, and an average rating of 5.35/10. The site's critical consensus reads, "Instead of humanizing the firemen, the movie idolizes them, and thus renders them into cardboard characters." On Metacritic, the film has a weighted average score of 47 out of 100, based on 32 critics, indicating "mixed or average reviews. Audiences polled by CinemaScore gave the film an average grade of "A−" on an A+ to F scale.

It received a rating of 3.5 out of 4 stars from Roger Ebert, who wrote: "The movie is not about a dying man whose life passes before his eyes, but about a man who saved a life and put himself in danger, and how he got to that place in his life, and what his life and family mean to him. Because it is attentive to these human elements, Ladder 49 draws from the action scenes instead of depending on them." Mike Clark of USA Today stated that "there has been a need for a big-screen feature about firefighter heroics since Sept. 11, but as a drama, Ladder 49 falls short of even the second rung."

== See also ==
- List of firefighting films
- List of films shot in Baltimore
- Worcester Cold Storage and Warehouse Co. fire
