= Victoria Tennant =

British actress (born 1950)

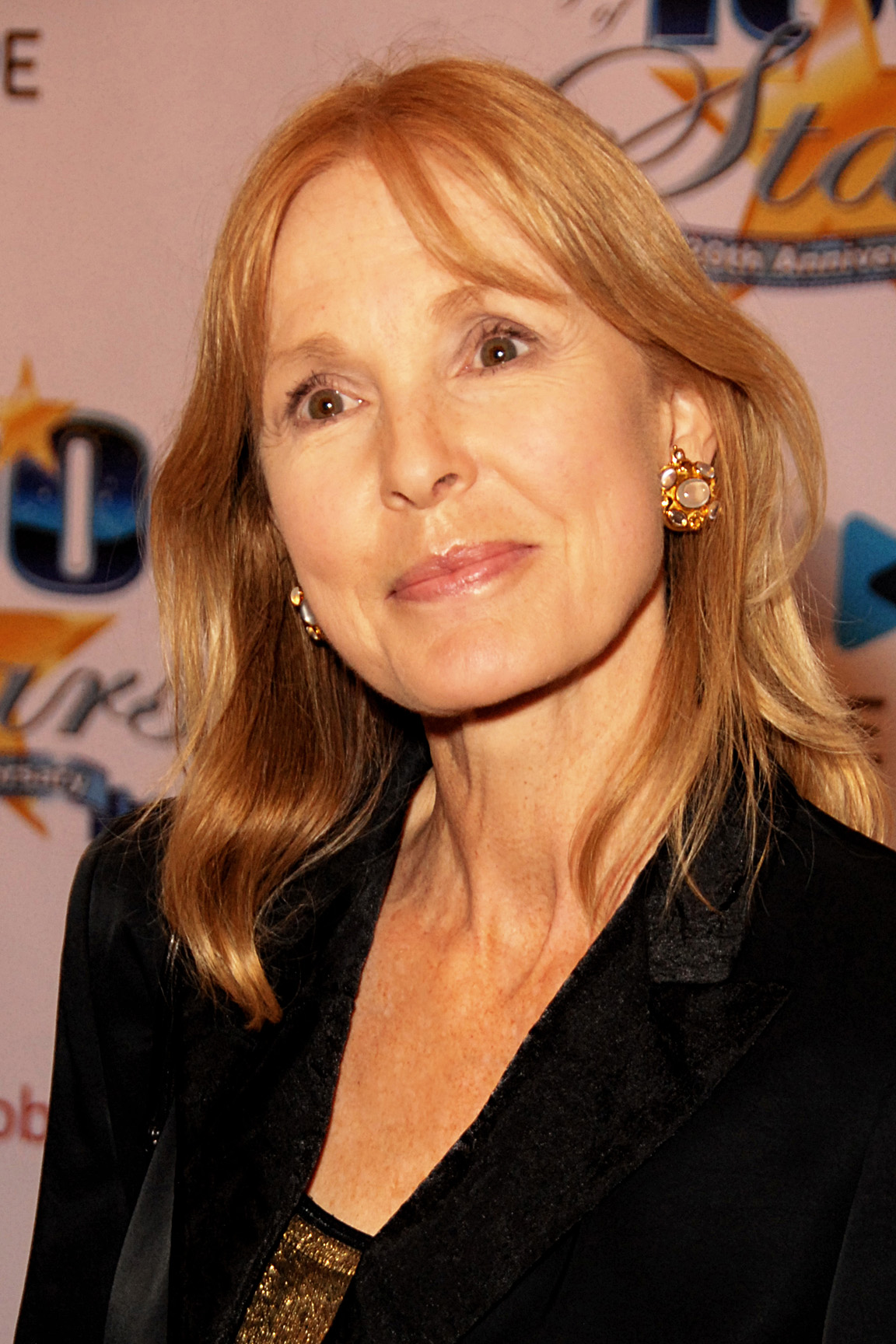
- Tennant in 2010
- Born: 30 September 1950 (age 76); London, England
- Education: Elmhurst Ballet School; Royal Central School of Speech and Drama
- Occupation: Actress
- Years active: 1972–present
- Spouses: Peppo Vanini (m. 1969; div. 1976); Steve Martin (m. 1986; div. 1994); Kirk Stambler (m. 1996)
- Children: 2
- Mother: Irina Baronova

Victoria Tennant (born 30 September 1950) is a British actress. She is known for her roles in the TV miniseries The Winds of War and War and Remembrance, in which she appeared as actor Robert Mitchum's on-screen love interest, Pamela Tudsbury, as well as her supporting roles in All of Me (1984), The Holcroft Covenant (1985), Flowers in the Attic (1987), The Handmaid's Tale (1990), and L.A. Story (1991).

== Early life and education ==
Tennant was born on 30 September 1950 in London, England, to Irina (née Baronova; 1919–2008) and Cecil Gordon Tennant (1910–1967). Her father, from a junior branch of a family of minor Yorkshire gentry resident at Kilnsey, was a producer and talent agent for MCA; her mother was a Russian prima ballerina from Saint Petersburg who appeared with the Ballet Russe de Monte Carlo. Tennant's maternal grandfather, Mikhail Baronov, was a senior officer in the Imperial Russian Navy; his wife, the former Lydia Vishniakova, was a general's daughter. Tennant has a sister, Irina, and a brother, Robert, both of whom were seriously injured in a car crash in 1967 that killed their father. Tennant's godfather was the actor Laurence Olivier.

Like her mother, Tennant trained in ballet, first at the Elmhurst Ballet School and then (for two years) at the Royal Central School of Speech and Drama.

== Career ==
After a number of roles in British and other European films, including The Ragman's Daughter (1972) and Inseminoid (1981), Tennant emigrated to the United States. She went to appear in films Strangers Kiss (1983), All of Me (1984) with Steve Martin, her future husband, and The Holcroft Covenant (1985). She starred as Pamela Tudsbury in the ABC miniseries The Winds of War in 1983, receiving Golden Globe Award nomination for Best Supporting Actress – Series, Miniseries or Television Film. She reprised her role in the sequel miniseries War and Remembrance (1988).

In 1987, Tennant starred in the neo-noir crime thriller Best Seller and the psychological drama film Flowers in the Attic playing the leading role. In 1990 she appeared in the dystopian drama film The Handmaid's Tale and was lead actress in the horror film Whispers. In 1991, Tennant starred alongside Steve Martin in the romantic comedy film, L.A. Story. She wrote the script for the 1996 romantic comedy film, Edie & Pen. The following years, Tennant appeared mostly in the smaller-scale films and guest-starred in television series including Diagnosis: Murder, JAG, Scrubs and Monk.

In 2014, Tennant published a memoir about her mother titled Irina Baronova and The Ballets Russes de Monte Carlo, published by the University of Chicago Press. The book was presented at the Bel Air Country Club in Bel Air, Los Angeles.

== Personal life ==
Tennant's first marriage was to Peppo Vanini, a nightclub owner who owned the Xenon nightclub. They married in 1969 and divorced in 1976.

She dated Matthew Chapman from 1978 until 1982, but ended their relationship upon meeting Steve Martin. She married Martin in 1986, but they divorced in 1994.

Since 1996, Tennant has been married to Kirk Justin Stambler.

== Filmography ==
=== Film ===
Year	Title	Role	Notes	Ref.
1972	The Ragman's Daughter	Doris Randall		
1980	The Dogs of War	Dinner Party Guest		
1981	Inseminoid	Barbra		
1981	Sphinx	Lady Carnarvon		
1982	Ich bin dein Killer	Annette Dorberg		
1983	Strangers Kiss	Carol Redding / Betty		
1984	All of Me	Terry Hoskins		
1985	The Holcroft Covenant	Helden von Tiebolt / Helden Tennyson		
1987	Best Seller	Roberta Gillian		
1987	Flowers in the Attic	Corinne Dollanganger		
1989	Fool's Mate	Alice Gordon		
1990	The Handmaid's Tale	Aunt Lydia		
1990	Whispers	Hilary		
1991	L.A. Story	Sarah McDowell		
1992	The Plague	Alicia Rieux		
1996	Edie & Pen	Blonde with Dog	Writer and producer	
1998	Bram Stoker's Legend of the Mummy	Mary		
2008	The Awakening of Spring	Mrs. Woodman		
2009	Irene in Time	Eleanor Jensen		
2010	Dante's Inferno: An Animated Epic	Beatrice (voice)	Video	
2013	Cold Turkey	Elizabeth Utley		
2013	Louder Than Words	Lydia Thorsby		
2018	Alex & the List	Barbara	Filmed in 2013	

=== Television ===
Year	Title	Role	Notes
1979	Sherlock Holmes and Doctor Watson	Helen Stoner	Episode: "The Case of the Speckled Band"
1981	La Guerre des insectes	Helen Curtiss	TV film
1982	Tales of the Unexpected	Bernice	Episode: "Who's Got the Lady?"
1983	The Winds of War	Pamela Tudsbury	TV miniseries
1983	Dempsey	Estelle Taylor	TV film
1983	Chiefs	Trish Lee	TV miniseries
1985	George Burns Comedy Week	Maggie	Episode: "The Funniest Guy in the World"
1986	Under Siege	Gloria Garry	TV film
1986	The Twilight Zone	Valentina	Episode: "Red Snow"
1986	Alfred Hitchcock Presents	Bride	Episode: "Deadly Honeymoon"
1988	Maigret	Victoria Portman	TV film
1988–89	War and Remembrance	Pamela Tudsbury	12 episodes
1989	Voice of the Heart	Francesca Cunningham	TV film
1989	Act of Will	Audra	TV series
1994	The Man from Snowy River	Anita Hargraves	Recurring role (5 episodes)
1997	Diagnosis: Murder	Victoria Larkin	Episode: "Deadly Games"
1999	Providence	Dr. Toynton	Episode: "Blind Faith"
2001	The Chris Isaak Show	Irene	Episode: "Dancin'"
2001	Sister Mary Explains It All	Bitter Divorcee	TV film, also producer
2004	JAG	Marta Sperling	Episode: "The Man on the Bridge"
2007	Scrubs	Maggie Kent	Episode: "My Scrubs"
2008	Monk	Ms. Benson	Episode: "Mr. Monk Paints His Masterpiece"
2009	The Beast	Susan Redman	Episode: "Infected"
2011	William & Kate	Celia	TV film

=== Music ===
- Hussy – theme song lyrics
