= Tom Bernard =

American film distributor

Tom Bernard at the 2026 New York Film Festival

Tom Bernard is an American film distributor specializing in art cinema and is one of the co-founders of Sony Pictures Classics (SPC). Bernard and fellow Sony Pictures Classics co-president Michael Barker have worked together for approximately four decades and have won 41 Oscars.

== Biography ==
An alumnus of the University of Maryland, Bernard was hired in 1981 by Nathaniel Troy Kwit Jr. to revamp the United Artists repertory division into the first modern-day specialized distribution company, then called United Artists Classics (1981–1983) He served as Division Director and Head of Sales until 1983. That is where he first worked with long-time collaborator Michael Barker. Bernard and Barker left UA to create Orion Classics in February 1983. They attended the Cannes Film Festival hoping to buy their first title and picked up Eric Rohmer's Pauline at the Beach when they were "in a desperate position". Looking back 30 years later, Bernard remembered the class of people was "very, very different then", "the only thing you can say is the same is they always have the best movies."

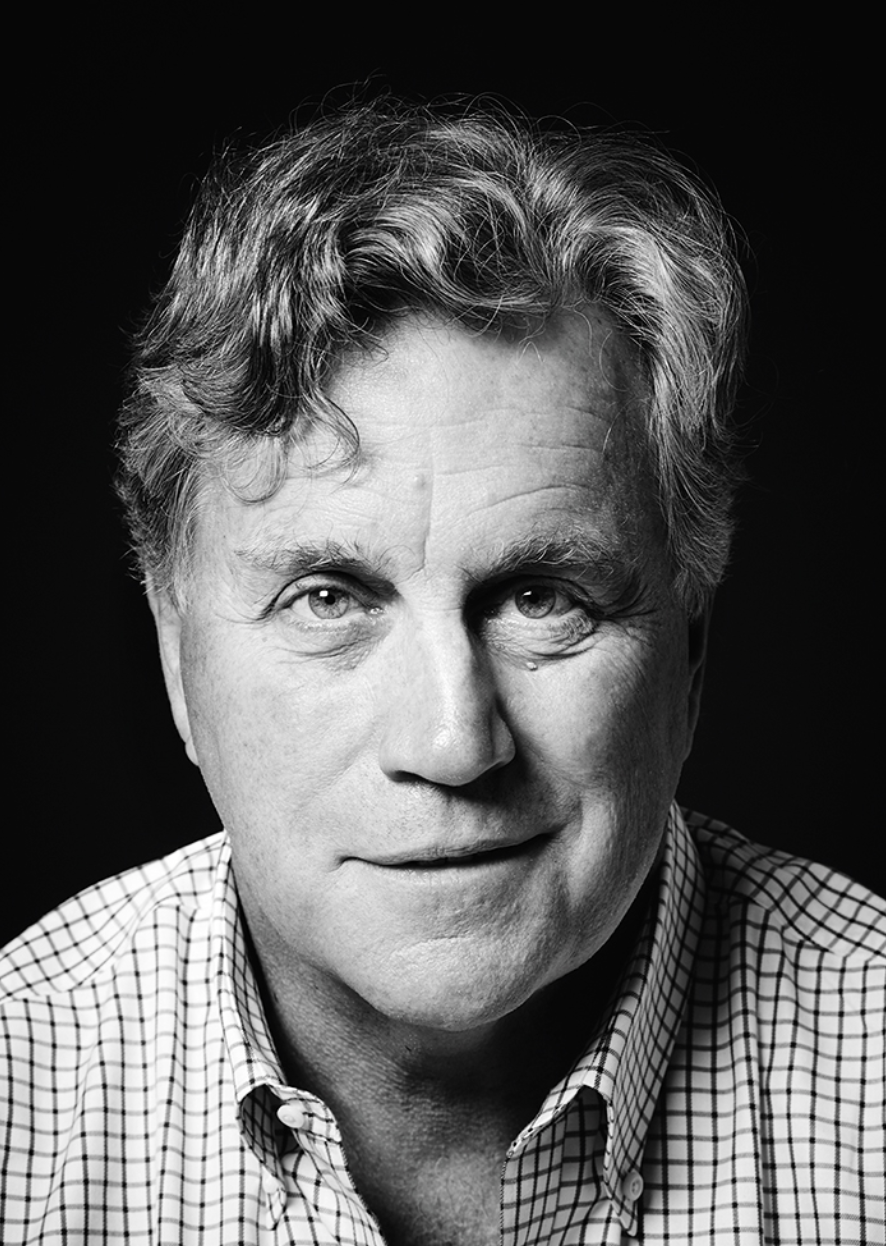
Tom Bernard

Bernard, with Barker, "oversaw United Artists Classics and Orion Classics, two studio arthouse divisions that served as the template for SPC, which they launched in 1992 as an autonomously run unit of Sony Pictures Entertainment....Since its inception, Sony Pictures Classics has been profitable every year except for one. Consequently, the co-presidents run the shingle without any interference from their corporate bosses, and are also protected by a longtime provision in their contracts."

Bernard is a member of the Academy of Motion Picture Arts and Sciences, the British Academy of Film and Television Arts, the Sundance Advisory Board, the Tribeca Film Festival Advisory Board and the Monmouth University Communication Board.

Bernard has "...distributed more Oscar winners than any other company in history when it comes to two categories: best documentary feature (1995’s Anne Frank Remembered, 1999’s One Day in September, 2003’s The Fog of War, 2010’s Inside Job and 2012’s Searching for Sugar Man) and best foreign language film (1992’s Indochine, 1993’s Belle Epoque, 1994’s Burnt by the Sun, 1997’s Character, 1999’s All About My Mother, Crouching Tiger, Hidden Dragon, 2006’s The Lives of Others, 2007’s The Counterfeiters, 2009’s The Secret in Their Eyes, 2010’s In a Better World, 2011’s A Separation, Amour and 2015’s Son of Saul."

Bernard has released films that have won "41 Academy Awards (37 of those at Sony Pictures Classics) and have garnered 181 Academy Award nominations (155 at Sony Pictures Classics)including Best Picture nominations for The Father, Call Me By Your Name, Whiplash, Amour, Midnight in Paris, An Education, Capote, Howards End, and Crouching Tiger, Hidden Dragon."

In 2002, Tom Bernard, along with his Co-Presidents of Sony Pictures Classics, was honored by the Directors Guild of America. Subsequently, in 2014, Tom Bernard was "presented with France’s highest military and civilian honor, the insignia of Chevalier of the Legion of Honor, at a ceremony at the French Consulate in New York." In addition, in 2014, Tom Bernard was honored by the Los Angeles Film Festival when he was presented with the Spirit of Independence Award.
