= Strangers Kiss =

1983 film by Matthew Chapman

- Theatrical release poster
- Directed by: Matthew Chapman
- Screenplay by: Matthew Chapman; Blaine Novak
- Story by: Blaine Novak
- Based on: The making of Killer's Kiss
- Produced by: Douglas Dilg
- Starring: Peter Coyote; Victoria Tennant; Dan Shor; Blaine Novak
- Cinematography: Misha Suslov
- Edited by: William C. Carruth
- Music by: Gato Barbieri
- Production company: Kill Productions
- Distributed by: Orion Classics
- Release dates: August 24, 1983 (Montreal); September 17, 1983 (Toronto); February 1, 1984 (United States)
- Running time: 94 minutes
- Country: United States
- Language: English

Strangers Kiss is a 1983 American drama film directed by Matthew Chapman, and starring Peter Coyote, Victoria Tennant, Dan Shor and Blaine Novak. The screenplay by Chapman and Novak documents the behind-the-scenes of Stanley Kubrick's second directorial feature, Killer's Kiss (1955).

The film premiered at the Montreal World Film Festival on August 24, 1983 and the Toronto International Film Festival on September 17 before being theatrically distributed in select markets by Orion Classics on February 1, 1984.

== Plot ==
To help his actress girlfriend regain her confidence, a Hollywood bigshot bankrolls a small film being made by a first-time producer and director duo. Despite the hand-to-mouth way it is made, the film turns out well, as does the off-set relationship between the actress and her unknown male lead.

== Cast ==
- Peter Coyote as Stanley, the director
- Victoria Tennant as Carol Redding / Betty
- Dan Shor as Farris, the producer
- Blaine Novak as Stevie Blake
- Richard Romanus as Frank Silvera
- Linda Kerridge as Shirley
- Carlos Palomino as Esteban
- Vincent Palmieri as Scandelli
- Jay Rasummy as Jimmy
- Jon Sloan as Mickey
- Joseph Nipote as Tony the Nose
