= Orion Classics =

Distribution label of Orion Pictures

- Type: Label
- Industry: Motion pictures
- Founded: 1982; 44 years ago (original); May 21, 2018; 8 years ago (relaunch)
- Founders: Michael Barker; Tom Bernard
- Fate: Merged into The Samuel Goldwyn Company (original)
- Headquarters: Los Angeles, California, United States
- Key people: Sam Wollman (senior VP acquisitions, MGM); Chris Ottinger; (MGM president of worldwide television and acquisitions); Alana Mayo (Orion Pictures president)
- Parent: Orion Pictures

Orion Classics started in 1982 as the distribution label for the then independent film production company Orion Pictures, now owned by Amazon MGM Studios. It was relaunched on May 21, 2018.

The original focus of 1980-era Orion Classics was on acquiring independent and foreign films for North American distribution, as headed by Michael Barker, Tom Bernard, and Marcie Bloom. In addition it aimed to produce some arthouse films of its own. It was launched when Barker, Bernard and Donna Gigliotti moved from UA Classics, a United Artists specialty division. Among its most notable films were Babette's Feast, Pedro Almodóvar's Women on the Verge of a Nervous Breakdown, Jim Jarmusch's Mystery Train and Richard Linklater's Slacker.

Since its relaunch Orion Classics has released Mike P. Nelson's The Domestics and Jim Cummings' The Wolf of Snow Hollow, among others.

== History ==
Orion Classics was formed by Orion Pictures in 1982 as an autonomous division for specialty films. United Artists Classics executives, Tom Bernard, Michael Barker and Donna Gigliotti, having a dispute with its parent United Artists, left to fill Orion Classics' executive ranks, thus mirroring Orion Pictures' formation. With the UA Classics executives, the division had built in connection with the art house film community. While the three executives had different titles and responsibilities they acted as all having the same responsibilities.

The division took on the early UA Classics modus operandi of frugal marketing spending and strict staggered releasing with few prints. Thus 10 to 50 prints would be made based on its potential success with an average marketing budget of $225,000 would be first released in New York City before moving on to other metropolitan areas and given time to find its position.

Orion Classics began cultivating contacts with European filmmakers immediately after its founding: the company decided to partially finance Werner Herzog's Where the Green Ants Dream and Marek Kanievska's debut film Another Country. The company also joined the ANICA in a bid to "open the market" by attempting to acquire Italian films without U.S. distribution; no distribution deals materialized from this arrangement however.

The team was able to get French filmmaker Eric Rohmer to switch from UA Classics to Orion. He was then the source of its first film and box office hit with Pauline at the Beach in July 1983. Thus Orion Classics released four out of five of Rohmer's 1980s films, also investing in a few of them in exchange for North American distribution rights. Orion Classics' final acquisition for 1983 was Strangers Kiss, its first American independent feature film.

In August 1983, the company had indicated that they would be into production of its own material by late 1984 or early 1985. However, Orion Pictures was having more box office failures than successes, putting these plans on hold.

In May 1984, Orion Classics revealed what was arguably its strongest lineup thus far: not only did the company have titles like Rohmer's The Green Ray and István Szabó's Colonel Redl on its slate, it was also poised to release Akira Kurosawa's Ran, the company's most expensive film. Despite a steadfast commitment to the foreign arthouse sector, Orion Classics continued to support the American independent sector by acquiring films such as Wayne Wang's Dim Sum: A Little Bit of Heart. Although this move seemed like a great opportunity to give independent filmmaking in the country a boost and attract Chinese communities in metropolitan areas to theatres, the film ultimately bombed at the box office. The years 1985 and 1986 proved to be the division's best period, with My Beautiful Laundrette, The Sacrifice, and A Great Wall all being critically and commercially successful domestically.

Given the grand success of its films in 1986, Orion Classics aimed to release ten films in 1987, also amping up their involvement in financing American independent fillms with End of the Line. For the latter, the division modified their distribution plan by producing a slightly larger number of prints than usual (in this case 60) and concentrating on targeting particular regional audiences with heavy local advertising. 1987 was yet another successful year for the company, with French films such as Jean de Florette, Manon of the Spring, and Au revoir les enfants becoming large successes. Furthermore, after it became the first Danish film to win Best Foreign Language Film at the 60th Academy Awards, Orion Classics expanded the release of Babette's Feast to similar financial results. 1987 also saw a two-film distribution agreement with FilmFour International in a drive to release more British films; the films covered in the deal, Rita, Sue and Bob Too and A Month in the Country, proved to be moderately successful.

By the late 1980s, competition in the independent film distribution market was increasing due to more mature content being produced, which presented opportunities for greater profits. Despite this challenge, Orion Classics' successful run of titles continued with Wings of Desire and Women on the Verge of a Nervous Breakdown; the latter went on to become the division's highest grossing title at approximately $8 million in domestic collections. However, Orion Pictures began to incur losses, attributed to long-term debt accrued from expanding into home video distribution in 1987, a string of box office bombs, and an internal battle between stockholders. Additionally, Donna Gigliotti left Orion Classics during this period and was replaced by Marcie Bloom.

Even after the troubles its parent company faced, Orion Classics released over a dozen commercially successful films between 1989 and 1990 such as Mystery Train, Too Beautiful for You, Jesus of Montreal, Monsieur Hire, and May Fools. Camille Claudel and Cyrano de Bergerac stood out with collections of $3.3 million and $5.9 million respectively as well as individual nominations for the Academy Award for Best Foreign Language Film; both films also cemented Gerard Depardieu's status as a rising star in the United States.

Towards the end of 1990, Orion Pictures' financial problems had been exacerbated even further, but its classics division trudged on, forging an agreement with Merchant Ivory Productions after Cinecom bowed out of the distribution business; this included the long anticipated adaptation of Howards End. In addition to the latter, Orion Classics also acquired May Fools and Rhapsody in August early in their production, but neither title did too well at the U.S. box office. Nevertheless, 1991 was another successful year for the division, with Europa Europa grossing over $5.5 million, and the microbudget film Slacker quickly achieving cult status and launching Richard Linklater's filmmaking career.

On December 11, 1991, Orion Pictures filed for bankruptcy protection and tried to restructure its classics division in a way that would satisfy creditors. Barker, Bernard, and Bloom were removed from their posts at Orion Classics when they were asked to become consultants to the company instead. When attempts by companies such as Groupe Canal+ and PolyGram Filmed Entertainment to acquire Orion Classics fell through, the trio sought negotiations with major American studios to establish an in-house classics division. The U.S. Bankruptcy Court forced Orion Classics to give up rights to Howards End; at the invitation of former Orion president Mike Medavoy, who was now located at TriStar Pictures, Barker, Bernard, and Bloom set up Sony Pictures Classics, with Howards End as the company's first release.

Shortly after, John Hegeman took over the reins of Orion Classics, but with little clarity of what was to be done with it. Nevertheless, the company retained rights to four titles acquired by the Barker-Bernard-Bloom administration: Raise the Red Lantern, A Woman's Tale, A Tale of Springtime, and The Adjuster. Most of these titles failed to create a splash in the American market, while Raise the Red Lantern was a minor financial success grossing over $2.5 million. Following the restructuring of its parent company and a shift to Los Angeles from New York City, Orion Classics not only lost access to the epicentre of the U.S. specialty film market, thus acquiring very few films throughout the mid-1990s, but was also forced to cease financing films and pivot strictly to distribution; the division continuously incurred losses during this period, with its only minor success being the 1995 film Jeffrey, which grossed roughly $3.5 million domestically.

In the mid-1990s, Metromedia acquired Orion, and merged the classics division into the Samuel Goldwyn Company. Both Orion and SGC were sold to Metro-Goldwyn-Mayer in 1997, with the latter's function of producing and/or distributing independent films being assumed by MGM's United Artists division.

=== Relaunch ===
In May 2018, it was announced that Orion Classics would be revived as a multiplatform distribution label, with 8 to 10 films being released per year. Orion Classics will be MGM's method of getting into the day-and-date theatrical-VOD business. The label's first film is Mike P. Nelson's The Domestics, which was released in theaters on June 28, 2018, and on VOD and digital the next day.

== Film library ==
| Title | Release date |
|---|---|
| Heads I Win, Tails You Lose | 1982 |
| The Pool Hustlers | 1982 |
| Beyond the Door | September 5, 1982 |
| Pauline at the Beach | July 29, 1983 |
| Carmen | October 20, 1983 |
| Scrubbers | January 31, 1984 |
| Privates on Parade | April 13, 1984 |
| Sugar Cane Alley | April 13, 1984 |
| Another Country | June 29, 1984 |
| Strangers Kiss | August 13, 1984 |
| Old Enough | August 24, 1984 |
| Full Moon in Paris | September 7, 1984 |
| Swann in Love | September 14, 1984 |
| Where the Green Ants Dream | February 8, 1985 |
| My New Partner | March 8, 1985 |
| MacArthur's Children | May 17, 1985 |
| Henry IV | June 28, 1985 |
| Dim Sum: A Little Bit of Heart | August 9, 1985 |
| Came a Hot Friday | October 4, 1985 |
| Colonel Redl | October 4, 1985 |
| Ran | December 20, 1985 |
| A.K. | January 29, 1986 |
| My Beautiful Laundrette | March 7, 1986 |
| A Great Wall | May 30, 1986 |
| The Green Ray | August 29, 1986 |
| Restless Natives | September 12, 1986 |
| The Sacrifice | November 1986 |
| El Amor brujo | December 23, 1986 |
| One Woman or Two | February 6, 1987 |
| Devil in the Flesh | May 22, 1987 |
| Jean de Florette | June 26, 1987 |
| Rita, Sue and Bob Too | July 17, 1987 |
| End of the Line | August 28, 1987 |
| Dancing in Water | September 18, 1987 |
| Manon of the Spring | November 5, 1987 |
| Au Revoir Les Enfants | December 1987 |
| A Month in the Country | February 19, 1988 |
| Babette's Feast | March 4, 1988 |
| Wings of Desire | May 6, 1988 |
| Loose Connections | July 8, 1988 |
| Boyfriends and Girlfriends | July 15, 1988 |
| Women on the Verge of a Nervous Breakdown | November 11, 1988 |
| Field of Honor | January 20, 1989 |
| Murmur of the Heart | February 3, 1989 |
| Chocolat | March 10, 1989 |
| The Reader | April 21, 1989 |
| The Music Teacher | July 7, 1989 |
| Mystery Train | November 7, 1989 |
| Camille Claudel | December 21, 1989 |
| Too Beautiful for You | March 2, 1990 |
| Monsieur Hire | April 20, 1990 |
| Jesus of Montreal | May 25, 1990 |
| May Fools | June 22, 1990 |
| Wait Until Spring, Bandini | June 29, 1990 |
| Life and Nothing But | September 14, 1990 |
| Leningrad Cowboys Go America | November 2, 1990 |
| Cyrano de Bergerac | December 1, 1990 |
| Open Doors | March 8, 1991 |
| Love Without Pity | May 31, 1991 |
| My Father's Glory | June 14, 1991 |
| Europa Europa | June 28, 1991 |
| Slacker | July 5, 1991 |
| My Mother's Castle | July 26, 1991 |
| Opera | September 6, 1991 |
| The Search for Signs of Intelligent Life in the Universe | September 27, 1991 |
| Rhapsody in August | December 20, 1991 |
| Raise the Red Lantern | March 13, 1992 |
| A Woman's Tale | May 1, 1992 |
| The Adjuster | May 29, 1992 |
| A Tale of Springtime | July 17, 1992 |
| Rain Without Thunder | February 5, 1993 |
| Boxing Helena | September 3, 1993 |
| Nostradamus | September 16, 1994 |
| Bar Girls | April 7, 1995 |
| Jeffrey | August 18, 1995 |
| Theremin: An Electronic Odyssey | August 24, 1995 |
| Maybe... Maybe Not | July 12, 1996 |
| Ed's Next Move | September 27, 1996 |
| Trees Lounge | October 11, 1996 |
| Prisoner of the Mountains | January 31, 1997 |
| This World, Then the Fireworks | July 11, 1997 |
| One Man's Hero | September 24, 1999 |
| The Domestics | June 28, 2018 |
| Unlovable | November 1, 2018 |
| Jinn | November 15, 2018 |
| Clara's Ghost | December 6, 2018 |
| Maine | December 14, 2018 |
| All These Small Moments | January 17, 2019 |
| Valley Girl | May 8, 2020 |
| The Wolf of Snow Hollow | October 9, 2020 |
| Nada é por Acaso | October 9, 2020 |
