= Simon Rouse =

English actor (born 1951)

- Born: 24 June 1951 (age 74); Heaton, Bradford, West Riding of Yorkshire, England
- Occupation: Actor
- Years active: 1972–present
- Spouse: Annie Holloway (m. 1978)
- Children: 2

Simon Rouse (born 24 June 1951) is an English actor, known for playing the role of Detective Chief Inspector, later Superintendent, Jack Meadows in the long-running ITV police drama The Bill.

== Early life ==
Rouse was born in Fagley, Bradford, West Riding of Yorkshire. His father, Jim, was an education inspector who was later appointed an OBE for his work. Simon grew up in nearby Heaton and went to St Barnabas Primary School and Belle Vue Boys' Grammar School there.

He first began acting with the National Youth Theatre while still at school. He later studied drama with the Rose Bruford College but cut short his studies to join the Royal Shakespeare Company.

== Acting career ==
=== Early stage career ===
Rouse started acting in the theatre. Early theatre roles included Joe in D H Lawrence's The Daughter-in-Law at the Nottingham Playhouse (1970); Crosby in David Storey's rugby play The Changing Room (1971) and Willy Blunt in Edward Bond's The Sea (1973), He performed with the Royal Shakespeare Company in several Shakespeare plays, including Trevor Nunn's Antony & Cleopatra (1972), and 'Tis Pity She's a Whore (1978). In 1985 he played opposite Lauren Bacall in Harold Pinter directed Sweet Bird of Youth.

=== Early television career ===
Rouse then moved to working in television. His early work was mainly with the BBC, appearing twice in their Play for Tomorrow strand, a sci-fi offshoot of the Play for Today series. He also guest starred in the 1982 Doctor Who story Kinda as the deranged Hindle, and played an unnamed character simply credited as "Yizzel's mate" in Carla Lane's Bread in 1986. In 1988 he played Graham Farrell, a business associate of Mike Baldwin, in Coronation Street. He appeared in EastEnders in 1990 playing the role of Superintendent Alan Millward.

He also appeared in films, including The Ragman's Daughter (1972), Butley (1974), Pop Pirates (1984) and Parker (1985).

=== The Bill ===
He first appeared on The Bill in 1990 and 1991 as Detective Superintendent Jack Meadows, drafted in from the Area Major Incident Pool. The character became a regular from 1992 when he was demoted to Detective Chief Inspector, and later promoted back to Superintendent, until the show's cancellation in 2010. He appeared in a total of 842 episodes.

=== Other television appearances ===
He later played the role of another police officer, Detective Sergeant Vernon Cooper, in Operation Julie, a three-hour dramatisation (shown in three parts) of the real-life drugs investigation. Coincidentally, Robert Gwilym also appeared as Detective Constable Dan Richard: he would return opposite Rouse for a recurring role in The Bill in 2004.

He has guest starred on such shows as Boon, Robin of Sherwood, The Professionals, Casualty and Minder.

In 2013, he appeared in Coronation Street as Lewis Archer's old friend Patrick Woodson, and as journalist Len Danvers in Broadchurch.

In May 2023, Rouse appeared in an episode of the BBC soap opera Doctors as Frank Watson.

=== Renewed theatre career ===
Rouse appeared in J.B. Priestley's When We Are Married, playing Albert Parker. The production ran at London's Garrick Theatre from 19 October 2010 to 26 February 2011 and also starred Maureen Lipman and Sam Kelly. In February and March 2012 he appeared in The Bomb, a series of short plays about nuclear weapons at the Tricycle Theatre in Kilburn.

In 2013, Rouse toured the UK in a stage production of Simon Beaufoy's 1997 comedy-drama film The Full Monty, in which he plays the role of Gerald. He continued playing the role in the West End in 2014, at the Noël Coward Theatre.
