= Sony Pictures Classics =

Arthouse division of Sony Pictures Entertainment

Sony Pictures Classics, Inc.
- Type: Subsidiary
- Industry: Entertainment
- Founded: January 1992; 34 years ago, in New York, New York, U.S.
- Founders: Michael Barker; Tom Bernard; Marcie Bloom
- Headquarters: New York City, U.S.
- Area served: Worldwide
- Key people: Michael Barker (co-president); Tom Bernard (co-president)
- Products: Motion pictures
- Number of employees: 25
- Parent: Sony Pictures
- Website: sonyclassics.com

Sony Pictures Classics Inc. (also known as Sony Classics or SPC) is an American independent film production and distribution company that is an autonomous division of Sony Pictures and part of the Sony Pictures Motion Picture Group. It was founded in January 1992 by former Orion Classics heads Michael Barker, Tom Bernard and Marcie Bloom. It distributes, produces and acquires specialty films such as documentaries, independent and arthouse films. As of 2015, Barker and Bernard are co-presidents of the division.

== History ==
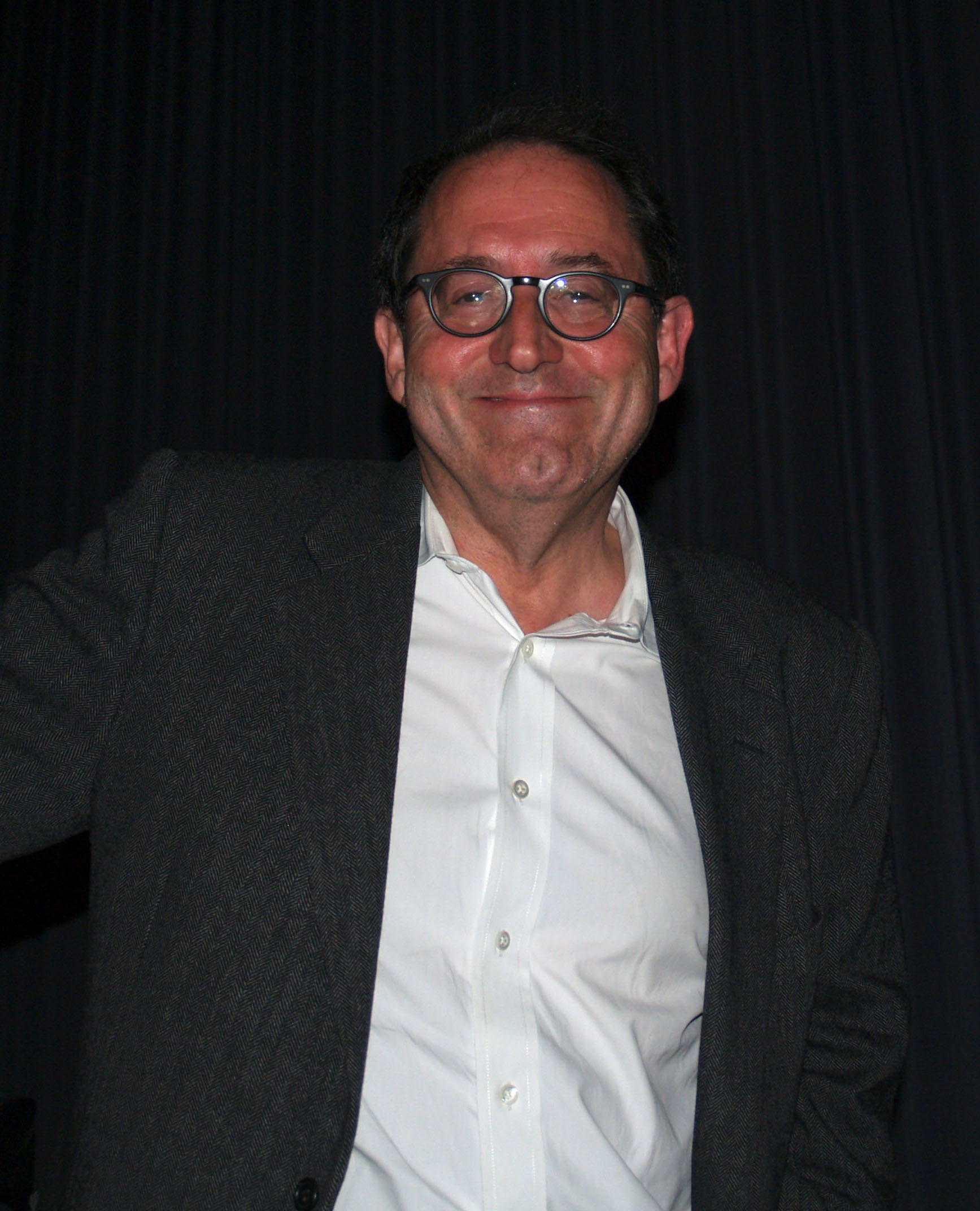
Co-founder and co-president Michael Barker

Sony Pictures Classics was formed in 1992 by Michael Barker, Tom Bernard and Marcie Bloom, and set up as an autonomous division of Sony Pictures to produce, acquire and/or distribute independent films from the United States and internationally.

It has released films that have won 38 Academy Awards and received 166 nominations, including Best Picture nominations for I'm Still Here (2024), The Father (2020), Call Me By Your Name (2017), Whiplash (2014), Amour (2012), Midnight in Paris (2011), An Education (2009), Capote (2005), Crouching Tiger, Hidden Dragon (2000) and Howards End (1992).

SPC has a history of making reasonable investments for small films and getting a decent return. It has a history of not overspending. Its largest commercial success of the 2010s is Woody Allen's Midnight in Paris, which grossed over $56.8 million in the United States, becoming Allen's highest-grossing film ever in the United States.

SPC has been a pioneer in theatrical distribution. In 2001, it championed the Chinese-language film Crouching Tiger, Hidden Dragon, which earned 10 nominations, the most ever for a non-English-language film (Roma would tie it in 2018), and win the Oscar for Best Foreign Language Film and a Golden Globe in 2001. The film earned over $213 million worldwide on a $17 million budget, including $128 million in the United States as a Sony Pictures Classics release.

In 2006, SPC promoted The Lives of Others to an Oscar and BAFTA, after it was rejected by the Cannes, Berlin, Venice, and New York Film Festivals.

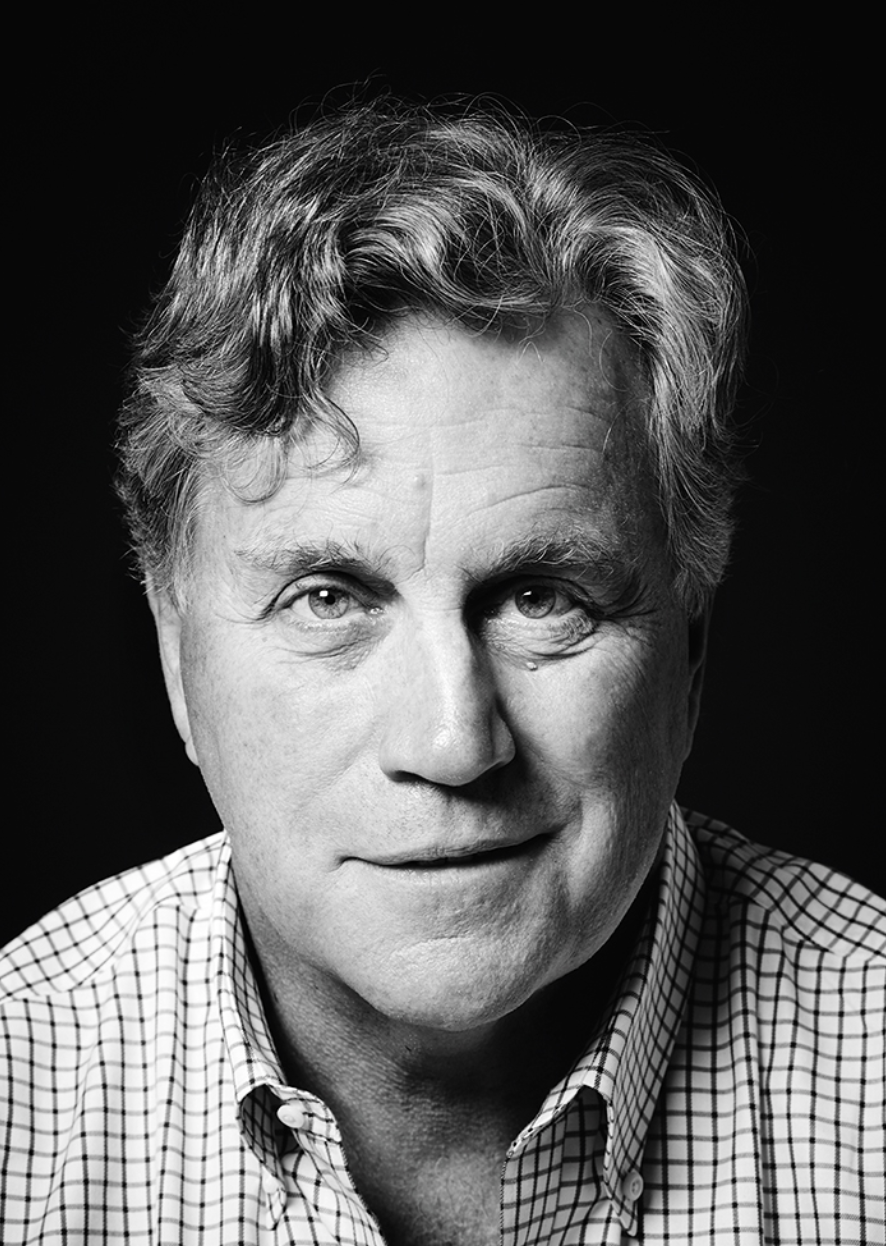
Co-founder and co-president Tom Bernard

SPC occasionally agrees to release films for Sony's other film divisions; however, under its structure within Sony, none of the other divisions (including the parent company) can force SPC to release any film it does not want to release.

In 2025, The New York Times polled over 500 filmmakers, actors, and film buffs around the world, compiling a list of the 100 greatest films of the 21st century by collating voters' top ten submitted films; ten titles released by Sony Pictures Classics made the list: Crouching Tiger, Hidden Dragon, A Separation (2011), A Prophet (2009), Call Me By Your Name, Amélie (re-released by SPC in 2024), The Lives of Others, Toni Erdmann (2016), Whiplash, Amour, and Volver (2006).

== Film library ==
=== Highest-grossing films ===
Crouching Tiger, Hidden Dragon was the company's first film to cross the $100 million mark worldwide, followed by Kung Fu Hustle (2004), Midnight in Paris, and Blue Jasmine (2013).

Highest-grossing films worldwide
Rank	Title	Year	Gross
1	Crouching Tiger, Hidden Dragon	2000	$213,966,221
2	Midnight in Paris	2011	$162,051,975
3	Blue Jasmine	2013	$102,912,961
4	Kung Fu Hustle	2004	$102,034,104
5	House of Flying Daggers	2004	$92,863,945
6	The Lives of Others	2006	$81,197,047
7	To Rome with Love	2012	$74,290,305
8	Talk to Her	2002	$64,826,117
9	Whiplash	2014	$50,431,161
10	Capote	2005	$49,924,079

== Accolades ==
Sony Pictures Classics has received a total of 166 Academy Award nominations, winning 38 overall.
