= King Cophetua and the Beggar Maid =

King Cophetua and the Beggar Maid may refer to:

- The King and the Beggar-maid, a story
- King Cophetua and the Beggar Maid (painting), an 1884 painting by Edward Burne-Jones
