= La Nuit du carrefour =

La Nuit du carrefour may refer to:

- Maigret at the Crossroads, 1931 novel by Georges Simenon
- Night at the Crossroads, 1932 film adaptation of the novel by Jean Renoir
