= The Beggar Maid (film) =

1921 film

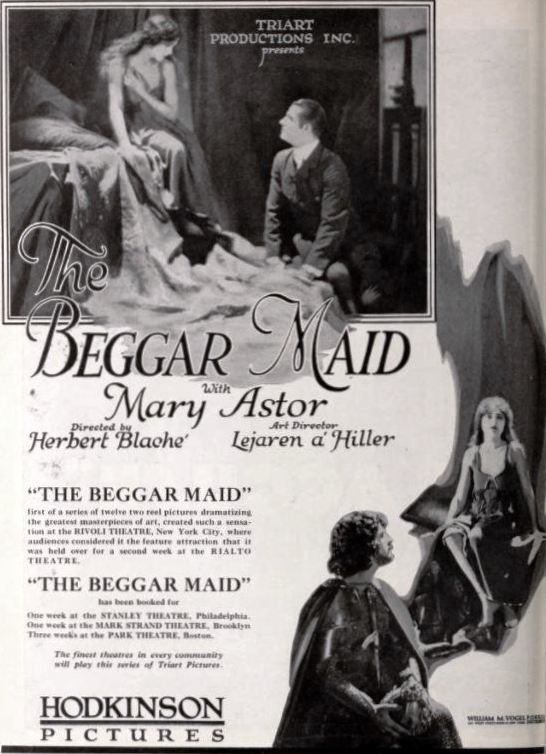
- Advertisement
- Directed by: Herbert Blaché
- Written by: Reginald Denny
- Based on: Tennyson poem and Sir Edward Burne-Jones painting
- Produced by: Lejaran A. Hiller; Isaac Wolpe
- Starring: Reginald Denny; Mary Astor
- Cinematography: Lejaran A. Hiller
- Production company: Triart Picture Company
- Distributed by: W. W. Hodkinson Corporation
- Release date: September 25, 1921
- Running time: 2 reels
- Country: United States
- Language: Silent (English intertitles)

The Beggar Maid is a 1921 American silent drama film based on the 1842 Tennyson poem of "The King and the Beggar-maid" and the 1884 painting of the scene by Sir Edward Burne-Jones. The feature was directed by Herbert Blaché and stars Reginald Denny and Mary Astor. A print of this film exists.

== Plot ==
This short film is the story of the youthful, idealistic Earl of Winston: an aristocrat who is hopelessly in love with the title character. She is the orphaned daughter of one of the Earls gardeners, who dutifully tends to her sick brother. Because of their different backgrounds, the Earl is unsure that a marriage will result in happiness. Will true love prevail?

== Cast ==
- Reginald Denny as The Earl of Winston/King Cophetua
- Mary Astor as Peasant Girl/the Beggar Maid

== Background ==
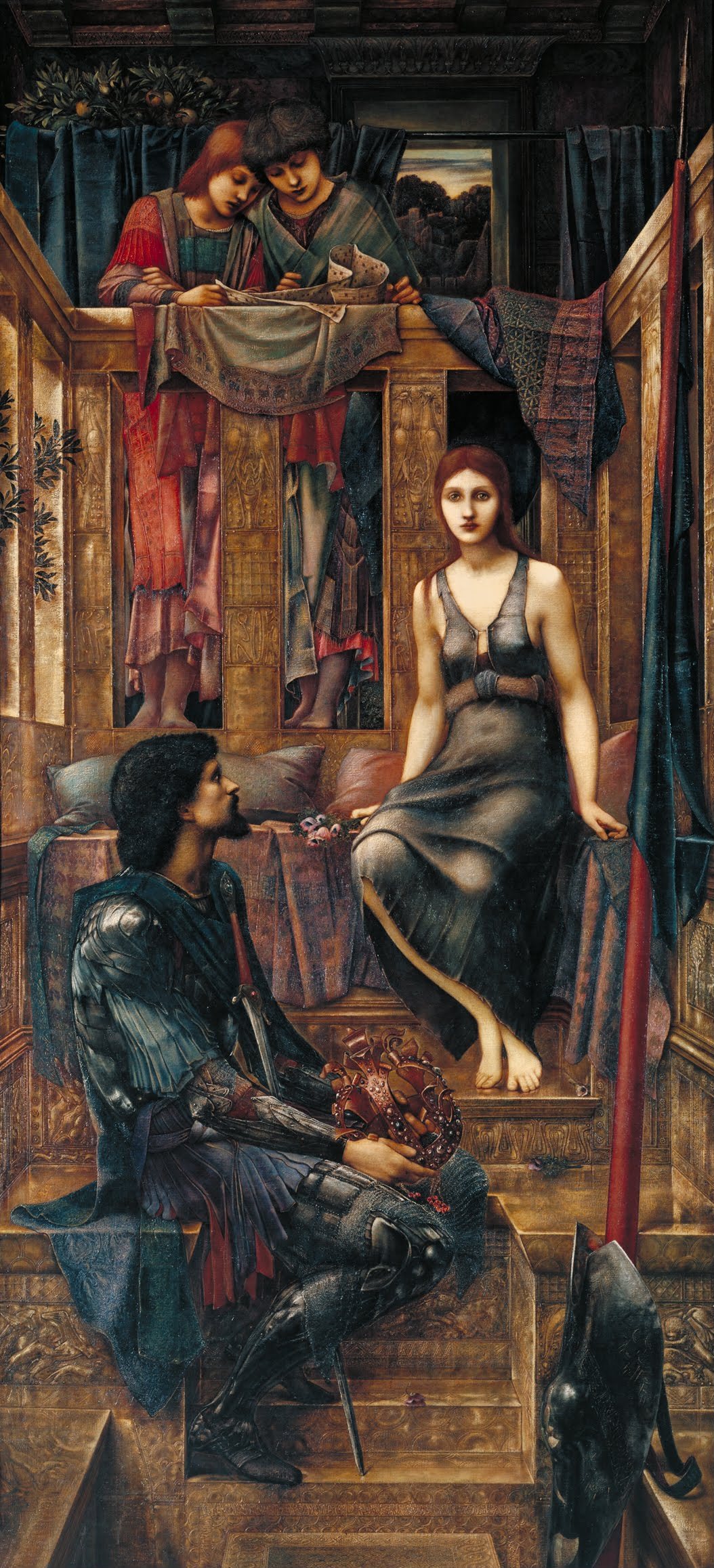
King Cophetua and the Beggar Maid, 1884 by Edward Burne-Jones

The poem by Tennyson and the painting by Burne-Jones which were the inspiration for the film:

Her arms across her breast she laid;
She was more fair than words can say;
Barefooted came the beggar maid
Before the king Cophetua.
In robe and crown the king stept down,
To meet and greet her on her way;
'It is no wonder,' said the lords,
'She is more beautiful than day.'

As shines the moon in clouded skies,
She in her poor attire was seen;
One praised her ankles, one her eyes,
One her dark hair and lovesome mien.
So sweet a face, such angel grace,
In all that land had never been.
Cophetua sware a royal oath:
'This beggar maid shall be my queen!'

by Lord Alfred Tennyson (1809-1892)
