= Kevin McNally =

English actor and writer (born 1956)

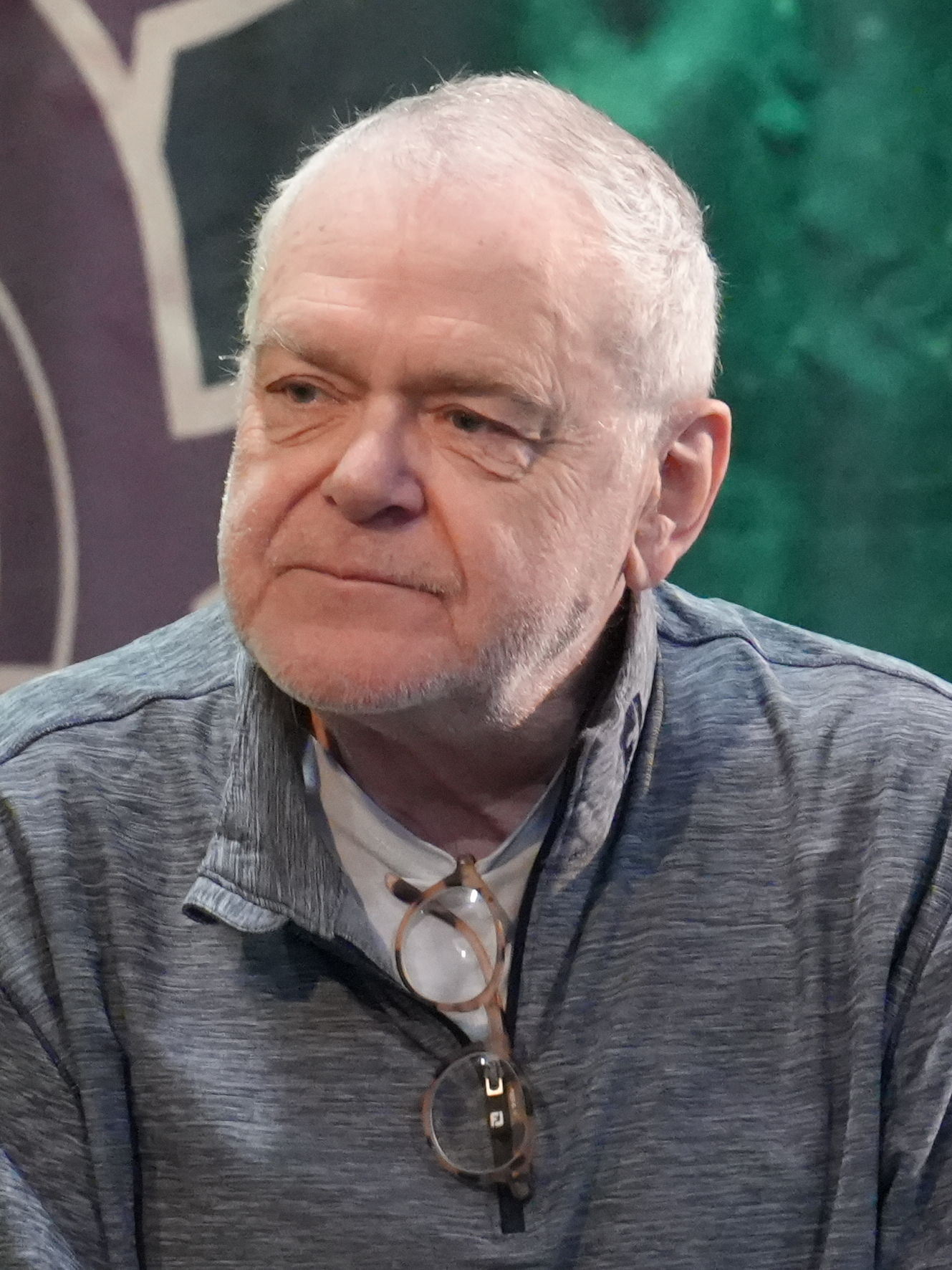
- McNally in 2025
- Born: Kevin Robert McNally; 27 April 1956 (age 70); Bristol, England
- Other name: Kevin R. McNally
- Education: Royal Academy of Dramatic Art
- Occupations: Actor; screenwriter
- Years active: 1976–present
- Spouse: Phyllis Logan (m. 2011)
- Children: 3

Kevin Robert McNally (born 27 April 1956) is an English actor and writer. He began his acting career in the BBC TV adaptation of I, Claudius (1976), but is best known for portraying Joshamee Gibbs in the Pirates of the Caribbean franchise.

== Early life and education ==
McNally was born in Bristol. McNally spent his early years in Birmingham, attending Redhill Junior School in Hay Mills and Mapledene Junior School (now Mapledene Primary School) in Sheldon. He went to Central Grammar School for Boys on Gressel Lane in Tile Cross.

== Career ==
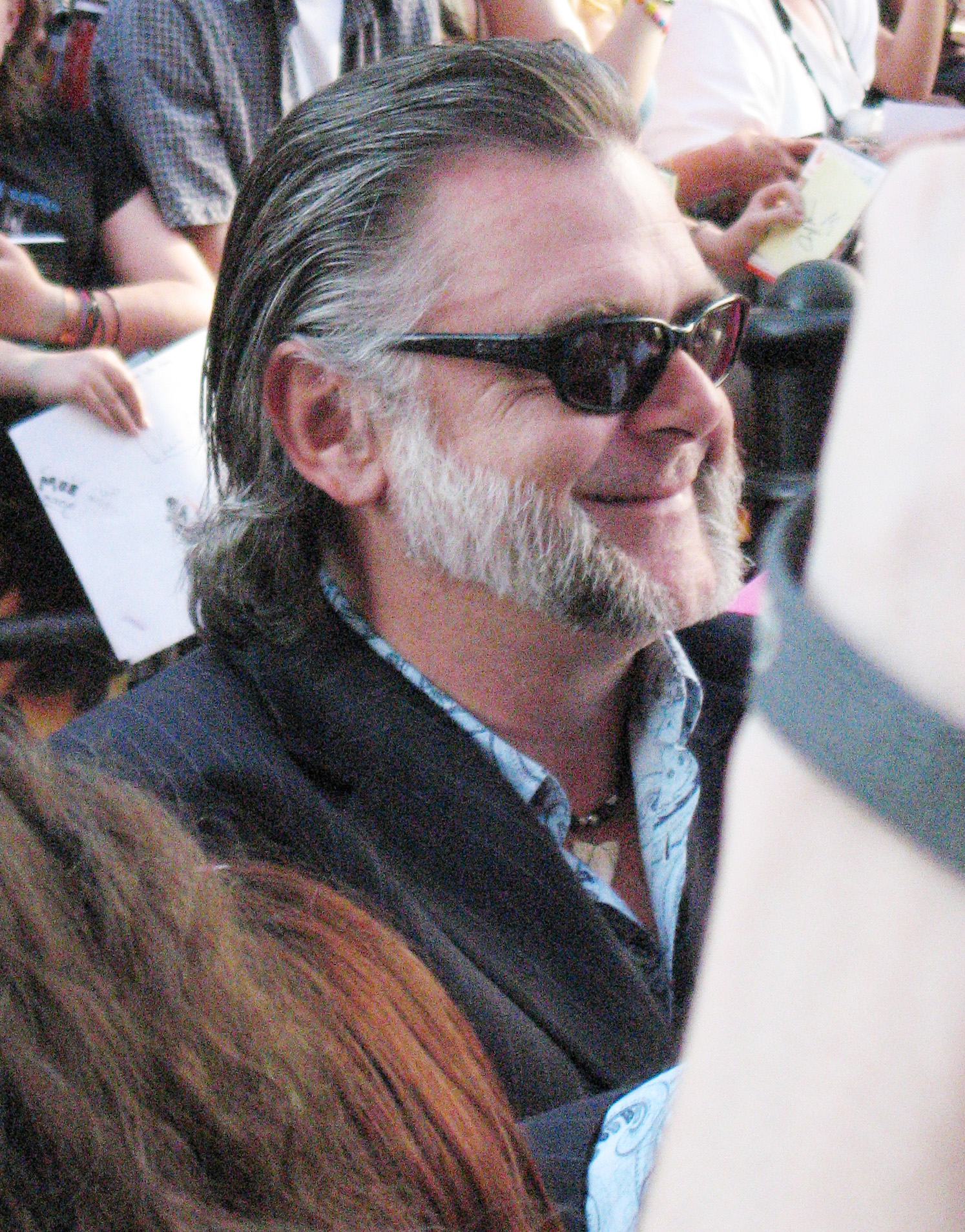
McNally in 2006

McNally's first professional acting work, at age 16, was at the Birmingham Repertory Theatre. In 1973 he received a scholarship to attend the Royal Academy of Dramatic Art where, in 1975, he won the Best Actor Bancroft Gold Medal.

In 1976, he appeared in BBC's I, Claudius and, in 1977, was a regular in the second series of Poldark playing Drake Carne, younger brother of Demelza Poldark. From 1991 to 1994, he wrote nine episodes of Minder, under the pseudonym Kevin Sperring, with writing partner Bernard Dempsey. He also wrote two episodes of Boon, and two episodes of Lock, Stock with Dempsey.

McNally played Joshamee Gibbs in the Pirates of the Caribbean films. He is one of only three actors who appear in all five films, and reprised the role in Kingdom Hearts III, making him the only actor from the film series to reprise a role in Kingdom Hearts. He also reprised the role in 2021 for Sea of Thieves' "A Pirate's Life" Tall Tale series.

Along with fellow British actors Ian McNeice and Kenneth Branagh, McNally appeared in two Second World War films, Valkyrie and Conspiracy, that depict behind the scenes activities of high-ranking officials in Nazi Germany.

In 2011, he was cast in the American television series Supernatural as Frank. In 2012, he provided the likeness and voice of Robert Faulkner in the video game Assassin's Creed III. In 2013, he began working on a science-fiction animation project, Starship Goldfish.

In 2014, he played the lead role in re-recorded radio plays of five lost episodes of Hancock's Half Hour for BBC Radio 4. Following this, a further video episode was re-recorded and broadcast on BBC Four as part of the Lost Sitcoms series.

From 2014 to 2017, McNally played Judge Richard Woodhull of Setauket, Long Island, in the AMC series Turn: Washington's Spies. In July 2019, he guest-starred as Inspector Grandjean in Season 2, Episode 1 of Amazon's mystery series Maigret.

In 2019, McNally portrayed Captain Mainwaring in a series of re-enactments of otherwise lost episodes of the sitcom Dad's Army.

In 2021, McNally appeared in three episodes of Flux, Doctor Who's thirteenth series, as Professor Jericho, quickly becoming a fan-favourite character. McNally previously appeared in Doctor Who in the 1984 serial The Twin Dilemma as Lieutenant Hugo Lang.

2021 saw him, also, star as Porthos, in the, multi-award winning, Philip Shaw written and directed, short film, Musketeer.

== Personal life ==
McNally was in a relationship with actress Stevie Harris and they have two children together.

He met actress Phyllis Logan in 1994, and they married in 2011. Their son was born in 1996. In 2013 the family lived in Chiswick.

== Filmography ==
=== Film ===
Year	Title	Role	Notes
1977	The Spy Who Loved Me	HMS Ranger Crewman	
1980	The Long Good Friday	Irish Youth	
1982	Enigma	Bruno, CIA	
1985	Not Quite Paradise	Pete	
1985	The Berlin Affair	Heinz Von Hollendorf	
1987	Cry Freedom	Ken Robertson	
1995	Pullman paradis	Tom Donahue	
1997	Spice World	Policeman	
1998	Sliding Doors	Paul	
1998	The Legend of 1900	Senator Wilson	
1999	Entrapment	Haas	
2000	When the Sky Falls	Tom Hamilton	
2001	High Heels and Low Lifes	Mason	
2003	Johnny English	Prime Minister	
2003	Pirates of the Caribbean: The Curse of the Black Pearl	Joshamee Gibbs	
2003	Crust	Bill Simmonds	
2004	De-Lovely	Gerald Murphy	
2004	The Phantom of the Opera	Joseph Buquet	
2004	Dead Fish	Frank Rosenheim	
2005	Irish Jam	Lord Hailstock	
2006	Pirates of the Caribbean: Dead Man's Chest	Joshamee Gibbs	
2006	Scoop	Mike Tinsley	
2007	Pirates of the Caribbean: At World's End	Joshamee Gibbs	
2008	Tu£sday	Jerry	
2008	Valkyrie	Dr. Carl Goerdeler	
2011	Pirates of the Caribbean: On Stranger Tides	Joshamee Gibbs	
2012	Hamilton: In the Interest of the Nation	Harold Smith	
2012	The Raven	Henry Maddux	
2013	Bounty Killer	Daft Willy	
2014	500 Miles North	Groundsman	
2015	Legend	Harold Wilson	
2015	The Man Who Knew Infinity	Major Percy Alexander MacMahon	
2016	Macbeth Unhinged	Duncan	
2017	Pirates of the Caribbean: Dead Men Tell No Tales	Joshamee Gibbs	
2019	Robert the Bruce	Old Sean	
2019	Underdogs Rising	Lawyer	
2021	Decrypted	Colonel Pike	
2021	Musketeer	Porthos	
2021	Painted Beauty	Det. Greene	
2022	Curse of the Macbeths	Duncan	
2024	Apartment 7A	Roman Castevet	
TBA	Death on the Dearborn	Sheriff Wilson	Post-production
TBA	Damaged Goods	Peter	Post-production

=== Television ===
Year	Title	Role	Notes
1976	Plays for Britain	Johnny	Episode 1.1: "The Paradise Run"
1976	Survivors	Jeff Kane	Episode 2.10: "Parasites"
1976	I, Claudius	Castor	Mini-series; 4 episodes
1976	The Launderette	Philip	Television film
1977	Z-Cars	Jeff	Episode 12.10: "Attack"
1977	The Duchess of Duke Street	Tom Prince	Episode 2.3: "A Lesson in Manners"
1977	Poldark	Drake Carne	Series 2; 13 episodes
1977	Crown Court	Paul Adams	3 episodes: "Street Gang: Parts 1–3"
1978	The Devil's Crown	Henry the Young King	2 episodes: "The Hungry Falcons", "Before the Dark"
1979	ITV Playhouse	Paul	Episode 11.3: "Where the Heart Is"
1980	Maria Marten, or The Murder in the Red Barn	Bill	3 episodes
1981	Masada	Norbanus	aka The Antagonists. Mini-series; episode 1
1982	Play for Today	Hugh	Episode 12.13: "Commitments"
1982	Crown Court	Christopher Baldwin	3 episodes: "Wrecker: Parts 1–3"
1982	We'll Meet Again	PFC John Wyatt	2 episodes: "Exceptional Circumstances", "The End of the Beginning"
1982	Praying Mantis	Bernard	Television film
1983	The Bad Sister	Tony	Television film
1983	The Hard Word	Nigel Wood	6 episodes
1983	A Brother's Tale	Bonny Taylor	3 episodes
1984	Diana	Jan	Mini-series; 8 episodes
1984	Doctor Who	Lieutenant Hugo Lang	Serial: The Twin Dilemma
1987	Casualty	Tom Bennod	Episode 2.14: "Burning Cases"
1988	The Contract	Johnny Donoghue	3 episodes
1988	Thin Air	Mark Gentian	Mini-series; 5 episodes
1989	Dream Baby	Slick	Television film
1989	Hard Cases	Richard Pearce	Series 2; 7 episodes
1989	The Bill	Mr. Todd	Episode 5.72: "Nothing But the Truth"
1989	Act of Will	Vincent Crowther	Mini-series; episode 1
1990	Jekyll & Hyde	Sergeant Hornby	Television film
1990	Tygo Road	Adam Hartley	6 episodes
1990	Murder East - Murder West	Regine's Boyfriend in the East	Television film
1991	The New Statesman	Colonel Gromyko	Episode 3.6: "Profit of Doom"
1991	Bottom	Sex Shop Assistant	Episode 1.1: "Smells"
1991	Minder	Richards	Episode 8.3: "Whatever Happened to Her Indoors"
1991	Murder Most Horrid	Inspector Turner	Episode 1.3: "He Died a Death"
1992	The Young Indiana Jones Chronicles	Walter Burton Harris	Episode 1.1: "Young Indiana Jones and the Curse of the Jackal"
1992	A Masculine Ending	Andrew Gardner	Television film
1992	No Head for Heights	Harry	Television short film
1992	Screen Two	Stuart Thorne	Episode 8.8: "The Common Pursuit"
1992	Stalin	Sergey Kirov	Television film
1993	Full Stretch	Baz Levick	6 episodes
1993	The Inspector Alleyn Mysteries	Luke Watchman	Episode 1.4: "Death at the Bar"
1993	Love and Reason	Phil Spencer	Mini-series; 3 episodes
1993	Mama's Back	Director	Television film
1993	Abraham	Nahor	Mini-series; 2 episodes
1994	Screen Two	Tommy O'Neill	Episode 10.3: "All Things Bright and Beautiful"
1994	Screen Two	Terry	Episode 10.7: "Return to Blood River"
1994	Murder Most Horrid	Mr. Bogleby	Episode 2.5: "Mangez Merveillac"
1994, 1996	Jo Brand Through the Cakehole	Various characters	2 episodes
1995	Ghosts	Craig Byatt	Episode 1.3: "Massage"
1995	Chiller	Jack Taylor	Episode 1.5: "Number Six"
1995	The Smiths	Clive Smith	Television film
1995	Eleven Men Against Eleven	Jake Leach	Television film
1995	Smith & Jones	Various characters	Episode 8.6: "Rough Direction."
1996	Screen Two	Billy McVea	Episode 13.5: "The Precious Blood"
1996	Frontiers	Supt. Graham Kirsten	6 episodes
1997	Underworld	Mr. Jezzard	Mini-series; 5 episodes
1997–1999	Dad	Alan Hook	Series 1 & 2: 13 episodes
1999	Rab C. Nesbitt	Tony Welthorpe, MP	Episode 8.2: "Commons"
1999	Midsomer Murders	Orville Tudway	Episode 2.4: "Blood Will Out"
2000	Up Rising	Terry Gaines	5 episodes
2001	Conspiracy	Martin Luther	Television film
2002	Shackleton	Captain Frank Worsley	Mini-series; 2 episodes
2002	Spooks	Robert Osborne	Episode 1.2: "Looking After Our Own". Uncredited role
2002	Bedtime	Simon	Series 2; 6 episodes
2004	Dunkirk	Major General Alexander	2 episodes: "Evacuation", "Deliverance"
2005	Bloodlines	James Hopkin	2-part thriller
2007	Life on Mars	Supt. Harry Woolf	Series 2; 2 episodes
2007	The Murder of Princess Diana	Charles Davis	aka Diana: The Final Journey. Television film
2007	The Minister of Divine	Wesley	Television film
2009	Demons	Mr. Tibbs	Mini-series; episode 3: "Saving Grace"
2009	Wuthering Heights	Mr. Earnshaw	Mini-series; 2 episodes
2009	Margaret	Kenneth Clarke	Television film
2009	Law & Order: UK	Harry Morgan	Episode 2.3: "Community Service"
2009	Big Top	Dad	Episode 1.4: "Dad"
2010	Agatha Christie's Marple	Inspector Sumerset	Episode 5.3: "The Blue Geranium"
2010	New Tricks	Fred Blackledge	Episode 7.3: "Left Field"
2010	Midsomer Murders	Gerald Farquaharson	Episode 13.6: "The Noble Art"
2011	Turbo Dates	Wilfred	Episode 3.1: "Chemistry"
2011	CSI: Crime Scene Investigation	Steven Watt	Episode 12.6: "Freaks & Geeks"
2011	Poe	Kyle Kilpatrick	Television film
2011–2012	Supernatural	Frank Devereaux	Season 7; 4 episodes
2011–2012	Downton Abbey	Horace Bryant	Recurring role; 3 episodes
2012	Room at the Top	Mr. Brown	Mini-series; 2 episodes
2012	Burn Notice	James Vanek	Episode 6.16: "Odd Man Out"
2013	The Challenger Disaster	Lawrence Mulloy	Television film
2013	The Mill	Mr. Timperley	4 episodes
2013, 2015, 2018	Starship Goldfish	Ghostworth (voice)	3 episodes
2014	24: Live Another Day	Russian Agent	Mini-series; episode 12: "Day 9: 10:00 p.m.–11:00 a.m."
2014	Marked	Brian Cruft	Television film
2014–2017	Turn: Washington's Spies	Judge Richard Woodhull	Series 1–4; 40 episodes
2015	Count Arthur Strong	Ernest	Episode 2.2: "The Day the Clocks Went Back"
2016	Power Monkeys	Spencer	6 episodes
2016	Fleabag	Older Man	Episode 1.2
2016	Lost Sitcoms	Tony Hancock	Mini-series; episode 2: "Hancock's Half Hour"
2016–2017	Designated Survivor	Harris Cochrane	Recurring role; 6 episodes
2017	Maigret	Inspector Grandjean	Episode 2.1: "Night at the Crossroads"
2018	The Good Fight	Franz Mendelssohn	Episode 2.6: "Day 443"
2018	Unforgotten	James Hollis	Series 3; 6 episodes
2018	The Outpost	The Smith	6 episodes
2018	The ABC Murders	Inspector Japp	Mini-series; episode 1
2018–2020	Das Boot	Jack Greenwood	Recurring role; 6 episodes
2019	Dad's Army: The Lost Episodes	Capt. George Mainwaring	3 episodes
2019	Catherine the Great	Count Alexei Orlov	Mini-series; 4 episodes
2020	The Crown	Bernard Ingham	Series 4; 5 episodes
2021	Doctor Who	Professor Eustacius Jericho	3 episodes: "Village of the Angels", "Survivors of the Flux", "The Vanquishers"
2022	Ten Percent	Ian Jays	Episode 1.4
2022–2025	The Wingfeather Saga	Podo Helmer	Series 1–3; 18 episodes
2023	Stonehouse	Harold Wilson	Mini-series; 3 episodes
2023	The Real Stonehouse	Himself - Narrator	Television Special
2023	Endeavour	Kenny / Supt. Jolliphant	Episode 9.2: "Uniform"
2023	Dead Ringers	Alan	Mini-series; episode 4
2023	Lovely Little Farm	Darling Donkey (voice)	Series 2; 6 episodes
2024	Silent Witness	Professor Peter Cherry	2 episodes: "Grievance Culture: Parts 1 & 2"
2024	Alex Rider	Max Grendel	Series 3; 3 episodes: "Widow", "Revenge", "Target"
2025	Miss Austen	George Austen	Mini-series; 4 episodes
2025	Argh and the Quest for the Golden Dragon Skull	King Kevin	Television film
2025	The Chelsea Detective	George Rushland	Episode 3.4: "For the Greater Good"
2025	Beyond Paradise	George Ellis	Episode 3.5
2025	Murder Most Puzzling	Gilbert Sullivan	Episode 1.3
2025	Midsomer Murders	Sir Alan Bruce	Episode 25.3: "Death Strikes Three"

McNally also co-wrote several episodes of the television series Minder and Boon in the 1980s.

=== Video games ===
Year	Title	Role (voice)	Notes	Ref.
2006	Pirates of the Caribbean: Dead Man's Chest	Joshamee Gibbs		
2007	Pirates of the Caribbean: At World's End	Joshamee Gibbs		
2007	Pirates of the Caribbean Online	Joshamee Gibbs		
2011	Lego Pirates of the Caribbean: The Video Game	Joshamee Gibbs		
2012	Assassin's Creed III	Robert Faulkner		
2013	Disney Infinity	Joshamee Gibbs		
2018	Sea of Thieves	Joshamee Gibbs		
2019	Kingdom Hearts III	Joshamee Gibbs	English version	
2021	Sea of Thieves: A Pirate's Life	Joshamee Gibbs		
2025	Final Fantasy Tactics: The Ivalice Chronicles	Duke Druksmaid Goltanna / Arazlam J.D.	English version	
2026	Corsair Cove	Rambulion / Narrator		

== Selected stage credits ==
Title	Role	Theatre	Notes	Ref.
King Lear	King Lear	Shakespeare's Globe	opposite Saskia Reeves, Burt Caesar	
Hamlet	Claudius	Donmar at Wyndham's Theatre	opposite Jude Law, Ron Cook and Penelope Wilton	
Ivanov	Lebedev	Donmar at Wyndham's Theatre	opposite Kenneth Branagh, Malcolm Sinclair and Gina McKee; Nominated – Laurence Olivier Award for Best Performance in a Supporting Role	
Boeing Boeing	Bernard	Comedy Theatre		
The Lady in the Van	Alan Bennett 2	Queen's Theatre	opposite Maggie Smith and Alan Bennett	
Naked	Grotti	Almeida Theatre	opposite Juliette Binoche	
Dead Funny	Richard	Savoy Theatre		
The Iceman Cometh	Paritt	National Theatre		
