= The Beggar Maid =

The Beggar Maid may refer to:

- "The Beggar Maid", a short story by Alice Munro in the book Who Do You Think You Are?
- The Beggar Maid (film), a 1921 American silent drama film
