= Attention, the Kids Are Watching =

1978 film

- Directed by: Serge Leroy
- Written by: Christopher Frank; Serge Leroy
- Based on: "The Children Are Watching" by Laird Koenig and Peter L. Dixon.
- Produced by: Alain Delon; Norbert Saada
- Starring: Alain Delon; Sophie Renoir
- Cinematography: Claude Renoir
- Edited by: François Ceppi
- Music by: Éric Demarsan
- Distributed by: Les Artistes Associés
- Release date: 1978
- Running time: 103 minutes
- Country: France
- Language: French
- Box office: 457,790 admissions (France)

Attention, the Kids Are Watching (French: Attention, les enfants regardent, also known as Careful, The Children Are Watching) is a 1978 French drama film starring Alain Delon.

== Plot ==
In a small town by the sea, a group of siblings aged 5 to 13 - Marlene, Dimitri, Marc (known as Boule) and Laetitia - spend most of their days watching television shows while under care of a Spanish nanny, who they call "Avocados", and dislike.

One day they all go to the beach. The nanny falls asleep on a rubber raft while sunbathing on the sand. For a joke, they put her out to sea. She panics when she wakes up and ends up drowning. The kids do try to save her, but when they fail they decide not to report it and use the opportunity to live as they wish.

A man arrives who saw the nanny drown. He blackmails the children. They decide to kill him.

== Cast ==
- Alain Delon : The Man
- Sophie Renoir : Marlène
- Richard Constantini : Dimitri
- Thierry Turchet : Boule
- Tiphaine Leroux : Laetitia
- Adelita Requena : Avocados
- Henri Vilbert : Le gardien
- Françoise Brion : Mademoiselle Millard
- Danielle Volle : La mère
- Marco Perrin : Gendarme
- Ticky Holgado : Gendarme
- François Cadet : Le pompiste
- Paul Crauchet : l'ami pecheur
- Michel Fortin : le chauffeur du bus scolaire

== Production ==
The film was based on the novel The Children Are Watching by Laird Koenig and Peter Dixon.

In June 1969 producer Ronald Kahn announced he had purchased the film rights and hired Koenig and Dixon to write a script. He said the film was "a strong comment about an age in which television can take over the minds of the young." This version of the film was not made.

Film rights were purchased by the production company of Alain Delon. However the movie was a box office disappointment.
