= Chaulet =

Chaulet is a French surname. Notable people with the surname include:

- Emmanuelle Chaulet (born 1962), French actress
- Georges Chaulet (1931–2012), French writer
- Pierre Chaulet (1930–2012), doctor who worked with the FLN during the Algerian War
