= Night at the Crossroads =

Night at the Crossroads may refer to:

- Night at the Crossroads (novel), a 1931 detective novel by Georges Simenon
- Night at the Crossroads (film), a 1932 French crime film by Jean Renoir, based on the novel
