= Last Chants for a Slow Dance =

- Directed by: Jon Jost
- Written by: Jon Jost
- Starring: Tom Blair
- Cinematography: Jon Jost
- Edited by: Jon Jost
- Release date: 1977
- Running time: 90 minutes
- Country: United States
- Language: English

Last Chants for a Slow Dance is a 1977 American independent drama film directed by Jon Jost and starring Tom Blair. In some quarters Last Chants is now considered an American classic; Jonathan Rosenbaum lists it as one of the "alternative" top 100 American films, and it is listed in the book 1001 Films You Must See Before You Die.

== Plot ==
The film follows an unemployed cowboy drifter (Tom Blair), estranged from his wife and kids, who drives across Montana in his pickup in a half-hearted attempt to find a job. As the film progresses, it seems that he has little interest in supporting his family, as he spends his time hanging out in bars and having one-night stands. He continues to drive from town to town until he robs and murders another man.

== Cast ==
- Tom Blair
- Steve Voorheis
- Jessica St. John
- Wayne Crouse
- Mary Vollmer
- John Jackson

== Production ==
According to Jon Jost's recollection, the film was shot in 5 days, costing $3000:

In 1977, having finished up Angel City, .... I decided to make another film, and corresponded with a friend from my years in Kalispell, Tom Blair. He was an actor from South Dakota, and ran the Whitefish Community College Theater Dept. I had never seen him act ..., but instead would hang around drinking beer and smoking dope with him. .... I went up to Montana for a week of recon, lining up some actors, and went back to LA. I wrote a few scenes, and going to Montana a friend, copy writer by profession, Peter Trias went with me. He wrote a bit when we got there. .... I promised them a new film for the [Edinburgh] festival. I went back to Missoula and the actors met with me there. Last Chants was shot in 5 days. I recorded some of the songs in it in Missoula, and returned to LA, to process the film and edit, and record 2 more songs. By mid-August it was done, for a cost of $3000.

Jost wrote, shot, and edited the film—and penned and recorded the country songs heard in the film.

== Reception ==
The film premiered on 31 August 1977 in Edinburg International Film Festival. According to Jon Jost, the initial reception was good. "I went to Edinburgh with it and Angel City. It made a nice splash, got press in Sight & Sound, and it seems I was seriously on my way in the far edges of the film biz."

Jost’s first narrative feature remains one of his most important works. Allegedly inspired by the life of Gary Gilmore, the film is a minimalist road movie that dissects macho behavior. Jonathan Rosenbaum calls it “My own favorite among Jon Jost's experimental narratives…Powerful and provocative.”
