= Véra Sergine =

French actress

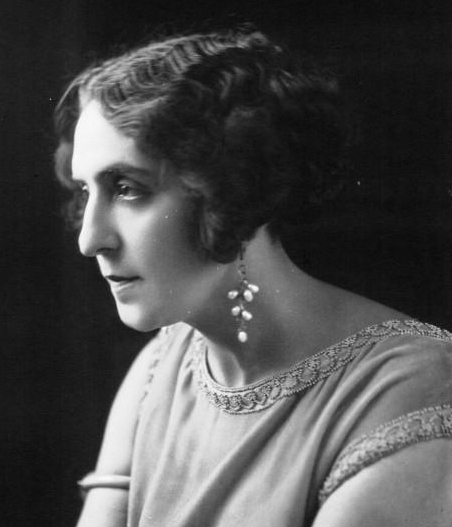
- Véra Sergine, photographed in 1923.
- Born: Marie Marguerite Aimée Roche; August 18, 1884; Paris, France
- Died: August 19, 1946 (aged 62); Cagnes-sur-Mer, France
- Occupation: Actress
- Spouse: Pierre Renoir (m. 1914; div. 1925)
- Children: Claude Renoir
- Relatives: Pierre-Auguste Renoir (father-in-law) Jean Renoir (brother-in-law) Sophie Renoir (granddaughter)

Véra Sergine (born Marie Marguerite Aimée Roche; August 18, 1884 – August 19, 1946) was a French actress (though her stage name meant she was often described as Russian). She was married to actor Pierre Renoir and was the mother of cinematographer Claude Renoir.

== Early life ==
Marie Marguerite Aimée Roche was born in Paris. Her father worked at the Ministry of Justice and Religion. She trained as an actress at the Conservatoire de Paris, and won a first prize while there, for Tragedy.

== Career ==
Sergine was a stage actress in Paris. She appeared in Une lâche (1907) with Albert Dieudonné, Le Grand Soir (1908), The Children's Cardinal, L'Aiglon, and Racine's Phedre. Critic André Germain counted her as one of the "three best actresses in Paris" in 1921, alongside Berthe Bady and Ève Francis.

Sergine appeared in several silent films, including Mary Stuart (1908), The Great Breach (1909), Pygmalion (1910), L'écharpe (1911), Moderne Galathée (1911), Les deux gosses (1912, 1916), Pro Patria (1914), Le médecin des enfants (1916), and Le geste (1917).

Her father-in-law, Pierre-Auguste Renoir, painted her portrait in 1914. During World War I, she traveled to a military hospital to tell the wounded Jean Renoir of his mother Aline Charigot's death, and caused an uproar with her short dress and cropped hair. The episode was incorporated into Renoir's 1937 film, La Grande Illusion. In 1916, she recited Saint-Georges de Bouhélier's Ode to Our Friends in the United States, at an event in the Sorbonne.

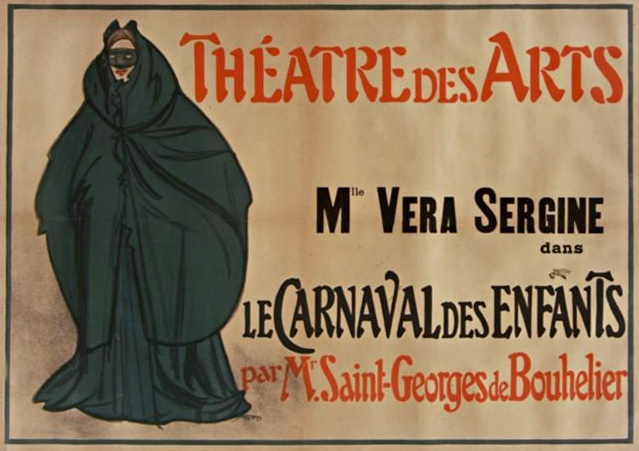
1910 poster advertising Vera Sergine in Carnaval des Enfants

Sergine continued acting through the 1920s, and was considered an exemplar of Paris women's style. In 1927, she toured as an actress as "French fashion ambassador", in Asia and North America.

== Personal life ==
Véra Sergine married fellow actor Pierre Renoir in 1914; they divorced in 1925. They had a son, cinematographer Claude Renoir, born in 1913. She also had a relationship with actor Henri Rollan. She died in 1946, in Cagnes-sur-Mer, aged 62 years. French actress Sophie Renoir (born 1964) is her granddaughter.
