= Sophie Renoir =

French actress (born 1964)

Sophie Renoir (born 1964) is a French actress. She is the great-granddaughter of the French Impressionist painter Pierre-Auguste Renoir (1841–1919), and daughter of the cinematographer Claude Renoir (1913–1993), granddaughter of actors Pierre Renoir and Véra Sergine, and grand-niece of film director Jean Renoir.

In 1988, she was nominated for César Award for Most Promising Actress for her part in Boyfriends and Girlfriends by Eric Rohmer.

== Filmography ==
- 1978 : Attention, les enfants regardent
- 1981 : Les Babas Cool
- 1982 : Le Beau Mariage
- 1983 : Julien Fontanes, magistrat
- 1987 : Boyfriends and Girlfriends
