= Love at first sight =

Falling in long-lasting love on first sight

Love at first sight is a personal experience and a common trope in creative works: a person or character feels an instant, extreme, and ultimately long-lasting romantic attraction for a stranger upon first seeing them. It has been described by poets and critics since the emergence of ancient Greece.

== Historical conceptions ==
=== Greek ===
In the classical world, the phenomenon of "love at first sight" was understood within the context of a more general conception of passionate love, a kind of madness or, as the Greeks put it, theia mania ("madness from the gods"). This love passion was described through an elaborate metaphoric and mythological psychological effect involving "love's arrows" or "love darts," the source of which was often given as the mythological Eros or Cupid, sometimes by other mythological deities, such as Pheme. At times, the source of the arrows was said to be the image of the beautiful love object itself. If these arrows arrived at the lover's eyes, they would then travel to and 'pierce' his or her heart, overwhelming them with desire and longing (love sickness). The image of the "arrow's wound" was sometimes used to create oxymorons and rhetorical antithesis.

"Love at first sight" was explained as a sudden and immediate beguiling of the lover through the action of these processes, and is illustrated in numerous Greek and Roman works. In Ovid's 8 AD epic, Metamorphoses, Narcissus becomes immediately spellbound and charmed by his own (unbeknownst to him) image, and Echo also falls in love with Narcissus at first sight. In Achilles Tatius's Leucippe and Clitophon, the lover Clitophon thus describes his own experience of the phenomenon: "As soon as I had seen her, I was lost. For Beauty's wound is sharper than any weapon's, and it runs through the eyes down to the soul. It is through the eye that love's wound passes, and I now became a prey to a host of emotions..."

Another classical interpretation of the phenomenon of "hunger at first sight" is found in Plato's Symposium (c. 385-370 BC), in Aristophanes' description of the separation of primitive double-creatures into modern men and women and their subsequent search for their missing half: "... when [a lover] ... is fortunate enough to meet his other half, they are both so intoxicated with affection, with friendship, and with love, that they cannot bear to let each other out of sight for a single instant."

=== Medieval, Renaissance and Baroque ===
Love at first sight was a feature of courtly love, a type of poetry which flourished in the south of France in the 12th century, created by poets known as troubadours. In particular, a glimpse of the woman's eyes was said to be the source of a love dart:

This doctrine of the immediate visual perception of one's lady as a prerequisite to the birth of love originated among the "beaux esprits" de Provence. [...] According to this description, love originates upon the eyes of the lady when encountered by those of her future lover. The love thus generated is conveyed on bright beams of light from her eyes to his, through which it passes to take up its abode in his heart.

In some medieval texts, the gaze of a beautiful woman is compared to the sight of a basilisk.

Giovanni Boccaccio provides a memorable example in his Il Filostrato, where he mixes the tradition of love at first sight, the eye's darts, and the metaphor of Cupid's arrow: "Nor did he (Troilus) who was so wise shortly before... perceive that Love with his darts dwelt within the rays of those lovely eyes... nor notice the arrow that sped to his heart."

William Shakespeare pays a posthumous tribute to Christopher Marlowe, who himself wrote "Who ever loved that loved not at first sight?" in his 1598 poem Hero and Leander, by citing him the next year in As You Like It: 'Dead shepherd, now I find thy saw of might: "Who ever lov'd that lov'd not at first sight?"'.

These images of the lover's eyes, the arrows, and the ravages of "love at first sight" continued to be circulated and elaborated upon in the Renaissance and Baroque literature, and play an important role in Western fiction and especially the novel, according to Jean Rousset.

== Psychology ==
Research has shown two bases for love at first sight. One is that the attractiveness of a person can be very quickly determined, with the average time in one study being 0.13 seconds. The other is that the first few minutes, but not the first moment, of a relationship have been shown to be predictive of the relationship's future success, more so than what two people have in common or whether they like each other ("like attracts like").

A 2017 study on love at first sight found that even though people reporting the experience retrospectively will recall features resembling passionate love ("constant thoughts about the person and the desire to be with him or her"), people reporting love at first sight currently after just meeting the potential partner only report neutral scores (neither agreeing nor disagreeing) on a romantic love measure including a passion component. Some authors have speculated that the remembered account of falling in love at first sight (with high passion) is often actually a memory confabulation. Furthermore, the study found that the experience of love at first sight was related to the physical attractiveness of the potential partner. This led the researchers to conclude that love at first sight is actually a strong initial attraction, rather than resembling the state of being in love.

== Occurrence in literature and the arts ==
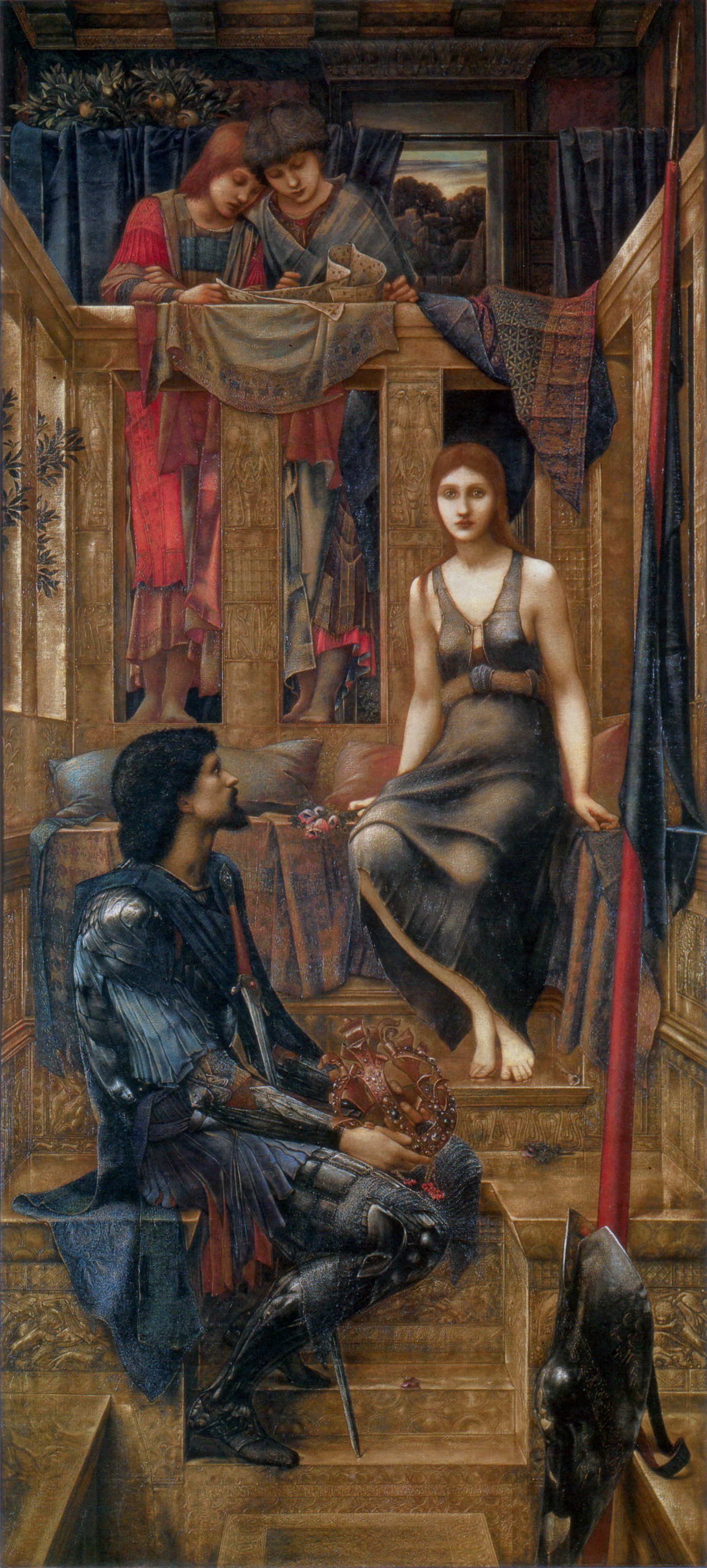
King Cophetua and the Beggar Maid, 1884, by Edward Burne-Jones, depicts an older tale of love at first sight.

=== Biblical references ===
- Commentaries on the Bible often view the account of Isaac's first view of Rebekah (Genesis 24:67) as love at first sight.
- The same holds for Jacob's first sight of Rachel.
- It has been proposed that Jonathan's feelings for David when they first meet in 1 Samuel is also "love at first sight". They have been described as such both by scholars who posited their relationship was erotic, and those who did not.

=== Literature ===
- The works of Dante Alighieri, an Italian poet of the Middle Ages who wrote many times about Beatrice Portinari; Alighieri had fallen in love with her early in his childhood, and her death in 1290 had a major effect on his life. Beatrice appears as a guide in Alighieri's Divine Comedy.
- The Elegy of Lady Fiammetta (c.1345) by Giovanni Boccaccio, describes the ravages of love at first sight on a woman.
- Troilus and Criseyde (c.1380s) by Geoffrey Chaucer, depicts the fateful love of Troilus and Criseyde in the final days of the Trojan War.
- Orlando Innamorato (1486) by Boiardo, the first sight of the beautiful princess Angelica.
- Jerusalem Delivered (1581) by Torquato Tasso, the witch Armida enchants the knights that perceive them.
- Romeo and Juliet (c.1595), by William Shakespeare, Romeo falls in love with Juliet when he first sees her.
- Sense and Sensibility (1811), by Jane Austen, Col. Christopher Brandon was captivated by Marianne's voice and falls in love with Marianne at first sight when he sees her playing the piano.
- The Little Mermaid (1837) by Hans Christian Andersen, the little mermaid falls in love with a human prince when she first sees him and rescues him from drowning.
- Les Misérables (1862) by Victor Hugo, the characters Marius Pontmercy and Cosette fall in love after glancing into each other's eyes
- Love at First Sight (1885) by James Brander Matthews, "As soon as the doctor saw her he felt that he loved her with the whole force of his being; no stroke of love at first sight was ever more sudden or more irresistible", said of a human chess game where the queen is the one who is loved at first sight.
- The Forsyte Saga: To Let (1921), when Jon and Fleur meet at the gallery.
- Master and Margarita (1968), Mikhail Bulgakov. Master and Margarita fall in love whilst walking alongside each other in a Moscovian street.
- The Godfather (1969), by Mario Puzo: Michael Corleone, who is exiled in Sicily after killing Lt McCluskey, falls in love with a young local girl called Apollonia at first sight. His Sicilian bodyguards refer to it as "the thunderbolt".
- The Silmarillion (1977), by Beren, who saw and fell in love with Lúthien.
- The Hunger Games (2008) by Suzanne Collins, Peeta Mellark falls in love with the protagonist, Katniss Everdeen, when he first sees her on the first day in school and hears her sing.

=== Popular songs ===
- (1949) "Some Enchanted Evening" by Richard Rodgers and Oscar Hammerstein II
- (1967) "With a Little Help From My Friends" by The Beatles, has the lyric: "Would you believe in a love at first sight? Yes, I'm certain that it happens all the time."
- (1969) "The First Time Ever I Saw Your Face" by Ewan MacColl.
- (1969) The first hit instrumental cover of Serge Gainsbourg's song "Je t'aime... moi non plus" used the title "Love at first sight."
- (1978) "Summer Nights" by Jim Jacobs and Warren Casey mentions love at first sight in the form of an unanswered question.
- (1980) "Love at First Sight" by XTC.
- (1991) "Love at First Sight" by Styx.
- (1999) "I Knew I Loved You" by Savage Garden.
- (2001) "Love at First Sight" by Kylie Minogue describes the phenomenon.
- (2003) "Love @ 1st Sight" by Mary J. Blige.
- (2004) In the music video for Maroon 5's "She Will Be Loved", the young man falls in love with the socialite mother of his girlfriend at first sight.
- (2006) "Get Together" by Madonna, has a line asking "Do you believe in love at first sight?".
- (2006) "Good Directions" by Billy Currington describes love at first sight.
- (2010) "As She's Walking Away" by the Zac Brown Band describes a man who fell in love with a woman at first sight.
- (2010) "Enchanted" by Taylor Swift describes her falling for a man at first sight she met that night in a social gathering.
- (2016) "Deja vu" by J.Cole

=== Opera ===
Opera plots must be condensed to fit their rendition in music and are thus highly suited to plot lines in which the principals fall in love at first sight. Often, this moment inspires composers to unusually fine music. Abundant examples include:

- (1791) In Mozart's opera The Magic Flute, Prince Tamino is presented with an image of Princess Pamina and instantly falls in love with her. He sings of his feelings as they unfold in the aria "Dies Bildnis ist bezaubernd schön" ("This image is enchantingly lovely").
- (1870) In Richard Wagner's Die Walküre, "Siegmund staggers storm-driven into Hunding's empty hut. Sieglinde enters and finds the stranger – they are unknown to each other, though brother and sister. They love at first sight."
- (1896) In Giacomo Puccini's La bohème, "Rodolfo ... is interrupted by Mimi, a neighbor who is looking for some matches to light her candle. It is cold and Mimi and Rodolfo huddle together. They tell each other about their backgrounds in two touching arias. It is love at first sight."
- (1911) "Di rigori armato il seno", an aria in Der Rosenkavalier by Richard Strauss, describes falling in love at first sight despite the sternest precautions taken. The singer is not himself in love; he is a professional singer sent to entertain the Marschallin. Later on, two main characters, Octavian and Sophie, fall in love at first sight as Octavian fulfills his titular duty, presenting Sophie with a scented rose of silver on behalf of her suitor Baron Ochs.

=== Film ===
- The Gold Rush (1925), the Prospector falls in love with Georgia upon seeing her.
- The Bowery (1933), Chuck falls in love with Lucy at first sight.
- Come and Get It (1936), Barney falls in love with Lotta at first sight.
- Bluebeard's Eighth Wife (1938), Michael and Nicole fall in love with each other at first sight.
- Gone With the Wind (1939), Scarlett falls in love with Ashley at first sight.
- The Strawberry Blonde (1941), Biff falls in love with Virginia at first sight.
- The Magnificent Ambersons (1942), George falls in love with Lucy at first sight.
- Heaven Can Wait (1943), Henry and Martha fall in love with each other at first sight.
- Cover Girl (1944), Coudair falls in love with Rusty at first sight.
- Great Expectations (1946), young Pip falls in love with Estella upon seeing her.
- The Ghost and Mrs. Muir (1947), where Miles claims to have fallen in love with Lucy at first sight while passing her on a stairway.
- Cinderella (1950), when the prince first sees Cinderella he falls instantly in love with her.
- Love at First Bite (1950), The Three Stooges reminisce about meeting their fiancees.
- From Here to Eternity (1953), Prewitt falls in love with Lorene the first time he sees her.
- Mister Roberts (1955), Frank falls in love with Ann at first sight.
- West Side Story (1961), a retelling of Romeo and Juliet, Tony and Maria fall in love the moment they see one another at a dance.
- How the West Was Won, 1962, Cleve tells Lilith he fell in love with her at first sight.
- The Godfather (1972), Michael gets "hit by the thunderbolt" when he first sees Apollonia.
- Love at First Bite (1979), the vampire Dracula pursues fashion model Cindy Sondheim, whom he thinks is a reincarnation of his true love.
- Somewhere in Time (1980), Richard Collier falls in love with Elise McKenna when he sees a picture of her in the Grand Hotel's museum.
- Blade Runner (1982), when Rick Deckard falls in love at first sight with Rachael, an experimental replicant. The event is a plot element in the 2017 film, Blade Runner 2049.
- Scarface (1983), when Tony first sees Elvira on the elevator he instantly falls in love with her.
- At Close Range (1986), when Brad Whitewood, Jr. and Terry first see each other they instantly fall in love.
- Wings of Desire (1987), the angel Damiel falls in love with circus performer Marion as he watches her on the trapeze. Marion falls in love with Damiel when she first sees him in her dream.
- The Little Mermaid (1989), when Ariel first sees Prince Eric she instantly falls in love with him.
- All the Vermeers in New York (1990), Mark falls in love with Anna at first sight when he sees her in an art museum.
- Back to the Future Part III (1990), Dr. Emmett Brown falls in love when first meeting Clara Clayton after saving her; Brown earlier had claimed that the "idea of falling in love at first sight" was "romantic nonsense".
- Edward Scissorhands (1990), Edward falls in love with Kim when he first sees her in a photograph.
- Aladdin (1992), when Aladdin sees Jasmine for the first time at the marketplace.
- Jason's Lyric (1994), Jason falls in love with Lyric from the moment he sees her.
- Dumb and Dumber (1994), Lloyd falls in love with Mary after she opens the door to him.
- Forrest Gump (1994), Forrest falls in love with Jenny when he sees her for the first time in a school bus.
- Four Weddings and a Funeral (1994), Charles loves Carrie since the first second he meets her, and after he tells near the end of the film and they kiss, a lightning bolt flashes across the sky. Fiona had fallen in love with Charles at first sight years earlier, and Tom falls in love with his distant cousin Deirdre while seating guests at Charles' wedding.
- I.Q. (1994), Ed falls in love with Catherine at first sight.
- Balto (1995), Balto falls in love with Jenna when he sees her for the first time at a mushing race.
- The Hunchback of Notre Dame (1996), Phoebus falls in love with Esmeralda when he sees her dancing.
- Titanic (1997), Jack falls in love with Rose when he first sees her.
- Conspiracy Theory (1997), Jerry tells Alice that he fell in love with her at first sight.
- Good Will Hunting (1997), Dr. Sean Maguire, a therapist and professor of psychology, relates how he fell in love with his future wife at first sight.
- Aniyathipravu (1998), Sudhi and Mini falls in love at first sight.
- 10 Things I Hate About You (1999), Cameron falls in love with Bianca the first time he sees her.
- Head Over Heels (2001), when Amanda first sees Jim she falls in love with him.
- Moulin Rouge! (2001), Christian and the Duke of Monroth falls in love with Satine when they see her.
- Big Fish (2003), Edward Bloom falls in love with Sandra Templeton the first time he sees her.
- Just Married (2003), when Tom and Sarah first see each other on the beach they fall in love.
- Secondhand Lions (2003), after Hub and Jasmine crash into the Mediterranean on their horses they look into each other's eyes and, as Garth says, "It was, plain as day, Love... at first sight."
- A Cinderella Story (2004), Austin falls in love with Sam when he looks into her eyes.
- 50 First Dates (2004), Henry Roth falls in love at first sight with Lucy Whitmore.
- Mean Girls (2004), when Cady first sees Aaron in math class she instantly falls in love with him.
- Mickey, Donald, Goofy: The Three Musketeers (2004), Princess Minnie falls in love with Mickey at first sight when she sees him.
- The Notebook (2004), Noah falls in love with Allie upon seeing her for the first time.
- Raise Your Voice (2004), Englebert 'Kiwi' Wilson Falls in love at first sight with Sloane.
- Imagine Me & You (2005), where Rachel falls in love with Luce "after three seconds" of seeing her. The film discusses the idea of love at first sight in depth and an early title for the film was Click, in reference to a French-language term for the sensation of coup de foudre/love at first sight.
- Cars (2006), when Lightning McQueen is put on trial for destroying Radiator Springs's road, Sally shows up and McQueen falls in love with her.
- August Rush (2007), when Louis meets Lyla he falls in love with her instantly.
- Sweeney Todd: The Demon Barber of Fleet Street (2007), when Anthony first sees Johanna singing at her room window he falls in love with her.
- Twilight (2008), when Bella first sees Edward she instantly falls in love with him.
- WALL-E (2008), WALL-E falls in love with EVE at first sight, and two members of the Axiom ship, John and Mary, fall in love with each other.
- (500) Days of Summer (2009), when Tom sees Summer for the first time.
- April Showers (2009), Sean falls in love with April when they first meet.
- Whatever Works (2009), Randy falls in love with Melody at first sight.
- Scott Pilgrim vs. the World (2010), Scott Pilgrim falls in love with Ramona Flowers in a dream.
- Gnomeo & Juliet (2011), Gnomeo and Juliet fall in love at first sight when their eyes meet.
- Hotel Transylvania (2012), Count Dracula's daughter Mavis and the human Jonathan Loughran fall in love when their eyes meet. Mavis' parents, Count Dracula and Countess Martha Dracula, also fell in love at first sight. They refer to it as a "zing".
- Mirror, Mirror (2012), when Snow White and Prince Alcott meet for the first time.
- About Time (2013), Tim falls in love with Charlotte at first sight.
- Magic in the Moonlight (2014), when Stanley meets Sophie he falls in love with her instantly.
- Carol (2015), Therese falls in love with Carol at first sight.
- Wonder Wheel (2017), when Mickey falls in love with Carolina at first sight.
- The Greatest Showman (2017), when Phillip falls in love with Anne upon seeing her on the trapeze.
- It (2017), both Billy and Ben fall in love with Beverly just by looking at her.
- Hotel Transylvania 3: Summer Vacation (2018), Count Dracula sees Ericka Van Helsing, and it was love at first sight.
- Sing 2 (2021), Meena falls in love with Alfonso when she sees him.
- Love at First Sight (2023), film

=== Television ===
- Coronation Street, Ken Barlow falls in love with Valerie Tatlock for the first time when they are introduced by Valerie's uncle Albert Tatlock in 1961.
- I Dream of Jeannie, Genie Jeannie falls in love with astronaut Tony Nelson on first sight in the 1965 series.
- The Vampire Diaries, Stefan Salvatore falls in love with Elena Gilbert the instant he sees her.
- Buffy the Vampire Slayer, Angel sees Buffy Summers being called to become the Vampire Slayer and he falls in love with her.
- iCarly, Freddie Benson falls in love with Carly at first sight, despite his somewhat young age.
- Friends, Russ and Julie fall in love at first sight upon seeing each other in the 1995 episode "The One with Russ".
- The Care Bear Family, Good Luck Bear and Polite Panda fall in love with each other upon meeting in the 1986 episode "The Long Lost Care Bears".
- The Simpsons, Homer Simpson falls in love with Marge Simpson at his first sighting of her, as described in the 1991 episode "The Way We Was".
- Clifford the Big Red Dog, in the episode "T-Bone, Dog About Town", T-Bone falls in love with a poodle with Mimi at first sight.
- My Little Pony: Friendship Is Magic, in the first episode (2010) Spike falls in love with Rarity at first sight.
- Mickey Mouse Clubhouse, the Sensational Six's tool distributor, Toodles, and Space Pirate Pete's tool distributor, Quoodles, fall in love the second they first see each other in the 2011 episode, "Space Adventure".
- Billions, Bobby Axelrod's recalls experiencing the "thunderbolt" when meeting his wife, Lara, in a key plot point in the second-season episode "With or Without You" (2017).
- Zoey 101, Chase Matthews falls in love with Zoey Brooks at first sight in the first episode.
- Even Stevens, Louis Stevens falls in love with Tawny Dean the instant he first saw her as shown in the episode, "The Weak First Week".
- Good Luck Charlie, PJ Duncan and Skylar fall in love the second they see each other in the 2011 episode, "Battle of the Bands".

=== Anime/manga ===
- Gokusen (2008), Sawada claims he was so cooperative with Yamaguchi due to the fact he fell in love with her at first sight.
- Sailor Moon, Sailor Moon falls for Tuxedo Mask when she first sees him, despite not realizing who he really is.
- The 100 Girlfriends Who Really, Really, Really, Really, Really Love You (2019–present), the plot involves mutual love at first sight between Rentarō Aijō and each of his 100 girlfriends.

== See also ==
- The King and the Beggar-maid, a 16th century tale of love at first sight used by Shakespeare, in paintings, and in other media.
