= Emmanuelle Chaulet =

French actress

Emmanuelle Chaulet is a French actress. She starred in Eric Rohmer's 1987 comedy Boyfriends and Girlfriends and Jon Jost's 1990 film All the Vermeers in New York.

== Filmography ==
- 1987 : L'Ami de mon amie, directed by Éric Rohmer (Blanche)
- 1988 : Chocolat, directed by Claire Denis (Mireille Machinard)
- 1989 : I Want to Go Home, directed by Alain Resnais
- 1990 : All the Vermeers in New York, directed by Jon Jost (Anna)
- 2005 : Sundowning, directed by Jim Comas Cole
