= All the Vermeers in New York =

- Directed by: Jon Jost
- Written by: Jon Jost
- Produced by: Henry S. Rosenthal
- Starring: Emmanuelle Chaulet; Katherine Bean; Gordon Joseph Weiss; Stephen Lack
- Cinematography: Jon Jost
- Edited by: Jon Jost
- Music by: Jon A. English
- Distributed by: American Playhouse Theatrical Films
- Release dates: September 11, 1990 (TIFF); May 1, 1992 (United States)
- Running time: 87 minutes
- Country: United States
- Language: English
- Budget: $250,000

All the Vermeers in New York is a 1990 American film written and directed by Jon Jost. It won the Caligari Film Award in the 1991 Berlin International Film Festival and the Best Experimental Film in the Los Angeles Film Critics Association Awards.

== Plot ==
Mark, a Wall Street financial broker, falls in love with a French actress at first sight, due to her resembling a painting by Johannes Vermeer, and then proceeds to follow her from room to room in a museum. The broker goes up to the actress, Anna, and introduces himself which spawns a romantic relationship. Anna lives with two roommates — a wealthy woman and a female opera singer. As the relationship evolves, Mark dies from a cerebral hemorrhage while calling Anna. The film ends with Anna going into a Vermeer painting.

== Production ==
The film was created with Jon Jost's love of Vermeer paintings as a central organizing theme. This is one of his first films produced in 35mm. Vincent Canby wrote in The New York Times the film's purpose was to show art as the last bit of humanism in a world without love. Marjorie Baumgarten, a writer for Austin Chronicle, called All the Vermeers in New York an experimental film. Emanuel Levy wrote in Cinema of Outsiders that the film is a mix of "narrative and experimental cinema".

== Reception ==
The film premiered at the Toronto International Film Festival on 11 September 1990. At the Berlin International Film Festival in 1991, the film won the Caligari Film Award for "thematic or stylistic innovation in film in the Forum of New Cinema section of the festival". Roger Ebert reviewed the film, saying "All the Vermeers in New York is the kind of film you have to think and think about, and then finally you realize you admire it.... If All the Vermeers in New York had been in French with subtitles, I would have known right away what to expect. It's unusual to find a film this brainy in English." Emanuel Levy praises the film, saying that "All the Vermeers in New York, Jon Jost’s most accessible work to date, deservedly winning the L.A. Film Critics Association Award for Best Experimental Film.... The deceptively simple story conceals deeper, more intriguing themes. It’s a meditation on the inner and outer worlds of two mismatched characters who represent the cultural bankruptcy of America’s upper-middle class."
