= Boyfriends and Girlfriends =

1987 French romantic comedy film by Éric Rohmer

Boyfriends And Girlfriends
- Theatrical release poster
- French: L'Ami De Mon Amie
- Directed by: Éric Rohmer
- Written by: Éric Rohmer
- Produced by: Margaret Ménégoz
- Starring: Emmanuelle Chaulet; Sophie Renoir; Anne-Laure Meury; François-Éric Gendron; Éric Viellard
- Cinematography: Bernard Lutic
- Edited by: María-Luisa García
- Music by: Jean-Louis Valéro
- Production company: Les Films du Losange
- Distributed by: Acteurs Auteurs Associés
- Release date: 26 August 1987 (France)
- Running time: 103 minutes
- Country: France
- Language: French

Boyfriends And Girlfriends (French: L'Ami De Mon Amie; also known as My Girlfriend's Boyfriend) is a 1987 French romantic comedy film written and directed by Éric Rohmer. The film stars Emmanuelle Chaulet, Sophie Renoir, Anne-Laure Meury, François-Éric Gendron and Éric Viellard. It is the sixth and final instalment in Rohmer's Comedies and Proverbs series. The title literally means the (male) friend of my (female) friend, or perhaps the boyfriend of my girlfriend: it echoes the proverb "Les amis de mes amis sont mes amis" ("My friend's friend is my friend").

== Plot ==
Blanche is freshly installed in Cergy-Pontoise, a trendy new town near Paris. She has a new apartment, a new job with no one over and no one under her. She meets Léa at lunch one day, and soon she meets an acquaintance of Léa, Alexandre, whom she approaches somewhat awkwardly. The film then follows the time-honored plot of exchange of relationships, as Blanche and Léa switch boyfriends.

== Cast ==
- Emmanuelle Chaulet as Blanche
- Sophie Renoir as Léa
- François-Éric Gendron as Alexandre
- Éric Viellard as Fabien
- Anne-Laure Meury as Adrienne

== Reception ==
The film received generally positive reviews from major critics. On Rotten Tomatoes it has an approval rating of 100% based on reviews from 10 critics.

Vincent Canby of The New York Times praised the film highly, saying, "L'Ami de Mon Amie is as clean and functional in appearance as the satellite city, but it's full of unexpected delights." Roger Ebert of the Chicago Sun-Times gave it three out of four and wrote: "Rohmer knows exactly what he is doing here. He has no great purpose, but an interesting small one: He wants to observe the everyday behavior of a new class of French person, the young professionals." Film critic Jonathan Rosenbaum also gave the film a favourable rating. Hal Hinson of The Washington Post wrote: "It's an utterly superficial movie – a celebration of superficiality – and utterly charming."
