= Nightshift (1981 film) =

- 4K restoration poster
- Directed by: Robina Rose
- Written by: Nicola Lane; Robina Rose
- Produced by: Mary Rose
- Starring: Pamela Rooke
- Cinematography: Jon Jost
- Edited by: Janet Revell; Robina Rose
- Release date: 14 August 1981
- Country: United Kingdom
- Language: English

Nightshift is a 1981 British avant-garde film directed by Robina Rose, written by Nicola Lane and Robina Rose.

The film follows a receptionist (played by Pamela Rooke) during her night shift at the Portobello Hotel in Notting Hill as she silently completes tasks and watches the hotel's eccentric guests. The encounters with guests are brief and episodic with no comprehensive plot connecting the segments.

Nightshift premiered at the Edinburgh Film Festival and was shown at Berlin's 12th International Forum of New Cinema in 1982. It was later screened in New York and acquired for the collection of the Museum of Modern Art.

The film was restored in 4K resolution by Lightbox Film Center at University of the Arts in Philadelphia in collaboration with the British Film Institute and Cinenova. The restored version of the film premiered in Berlin and New York in 2024.

== Production ==
Nightshift was produced on a minimal budget with filming taking place entirely inside the Portobello Hotel. The owners of the hotel allowed the venue to be used for the movie and shooting took place over the span of four nights. The cast and crew worked for free and the movie was funded partially by a small Arts Grant. Simon Jeffes of the British avant-pop band Penguin Cafe Orchestra, a close friend of Rose, composed the movie's score. Cinematographer Jon Jost and members of Penguin Cafe Orchestra appear as actors in the film. Jost loaned his 16mm camera for the film and donated high-contrast reversal film stock he had purchased on discount, adding to the film's distinctive unreal quality.

== Release ==
Nightshift premiered at the Edinburgh Film Festival on August 14, 1981 and was shown at Berlin's 12th International Forum of New Cinema in 1982. It was later screened in New York and acquired for the collection of the Museum of Modern Art.

The film was restored in 4K resolution by Lightbox Film Center at University of the Arts in Philadelphia in collaboration with the British Film Institute and Cinenova. The restored version of the film premiered in Berlin and New York in 2024.
