= Claude Renoir =

French cinematographer

Claude Renoir (French: [ʁənwaʁ]; December 4, 1913 – September 5, 1993) was a French cinematographer. He was the son of actor Pierre Renoir, the grandson of painter Pierre-Auguste Renoir, and the nephew of director Jean Renoir.

== Career ==
Renoir was born in Paris, his mother being actress Véra Sergine. He was apprenticed to Boris Kaufman, a brother of Dziga Vertov, who much later worked in the United States on such films as On the Waterfront (1954). Renoir was the lighting cameraman on numerous pictures such as Monsieur Vincent (1947), Jean Renoir's The River (1951), Cleopatra (1963), Roger Vadim's Barbarella (1968), John Frankenheimer's French Connection II (1975), and the James Bond film The Spy Who Loved Me (1977). At the time of Claude Renoir's death, The Times of London wrote of The River that "its exquisite evocation of the Indian scene, helped to inaugurate a new era in the cinema, one in which color was finally accepted as a medium fit for great film makers to work in."

He also participated in the making of The Mystery of Picasso (1956), the documentary on painter Pablo Picasso directed by Henri-Georges Clouzot. He was the cinematographer for The Crucible (1957) and lived in East Germany during filming. Renoir's career came to a close in the late 1970s, as he was rapidly losing his sight. In his final years he was largely blind.

== Personal life ==
Renoir married twice and had two children, a son and a daughter, actress Sophie Renoir. He died at age 79 in Troyes, 55 miles east of Paris, near the village of Essoyes, where he had a home.

== Selected filmography ==
film	year
Toni	1935
Lights of Paris	1938
Serenade	1940
Jericho	1946
The Ideal Couple	1946
Dilemma of Two Angels	1948
Doctor Laennec	1949
Prelude to Glory	1950
Madame Butterfly	1954
A Missionary	1955
One Life	1958
Blood and Roses	1960
The Lovers of Teruel	1962
Paris When It Sizzles	1964
Marco the Magnificent	1965
The Hour of Truth	1965
La Grande Vadrouille	1966
Paris in August	1966
Barbarella	1968
The Adventurers	1970
The Lady in the Car with Glasses and a Gun	1970
The Burglars	1971
Le Tueur	1972
Une femme fidèle	1976
The Spy Who Loved Me	1977
