= Pierre Renoir =

French actor (1885–1952)

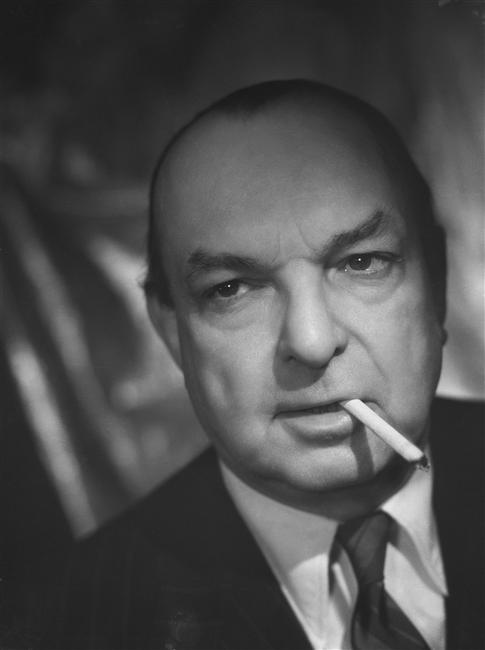
- Renoir in 1943
- Born: 21 March 1885; Paris, France
- Died: 11 March 1952 (aged 66); Paris, France
- Occupation: Actor
- Years active: 1907–1952
- Spouse: Véra Sergine (m. 1914; div. 1925)
- Children: Claude Renoir
- Parent(s): Pierre-Auguste Renoir; Aline Charigot
- Relatives: Jean Renoir (brother); Sophie Renoir (granddaughter)

Pierre Renoir (French: [pjɛʁ ʁənwaʁ]; 21 March 1885 – 11 March 1952) was a French stage and film actor. He was the son of the impressionist painter Pierre-Auguste Renoir and elder brother of the film director Jean Renoir. He is also noted for being the first actor to play Georges Simenon's character Inspector Jules Maigret in Night at the Crossroads, directed by his brother.

== Life and career ==
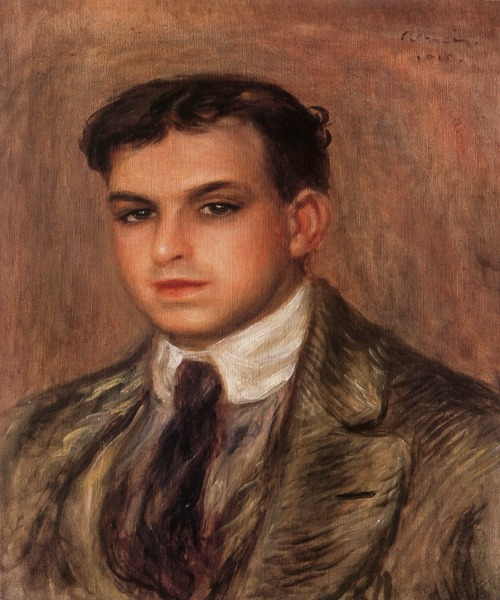
Renoir in a painting by his father Pierre-Auguste Renoir (1895–96)

Pierre Renoir was born on 21 March 1885 in Paris, at 18 rue Houdon, about a hundred meters from place Pigalle, to painter Pierre-Auguste Renoir and Aline Charigot. He was married to actress Véra Sergine from 1914 to 1925.

For his best remembered role, as Jėricho the ragman in Children of Paradise (Les Enfants du Paradis, 1945); he was cast at short notice to replace the collaborator Robert Le Vigan, whose Jėricho's scenes had to be reshot. Renoir was briefly the director of the Théâtre de l'Athénée in Paris, taking over after the death of Louis Jouvet in 1951. Pierre Renoir's son was the cinematographer Claude Renoir (1913–93) –not to be confused with Pierre's brother Claude Renoir, known as 'Coco' (1901–69).

== Selected filmography ==
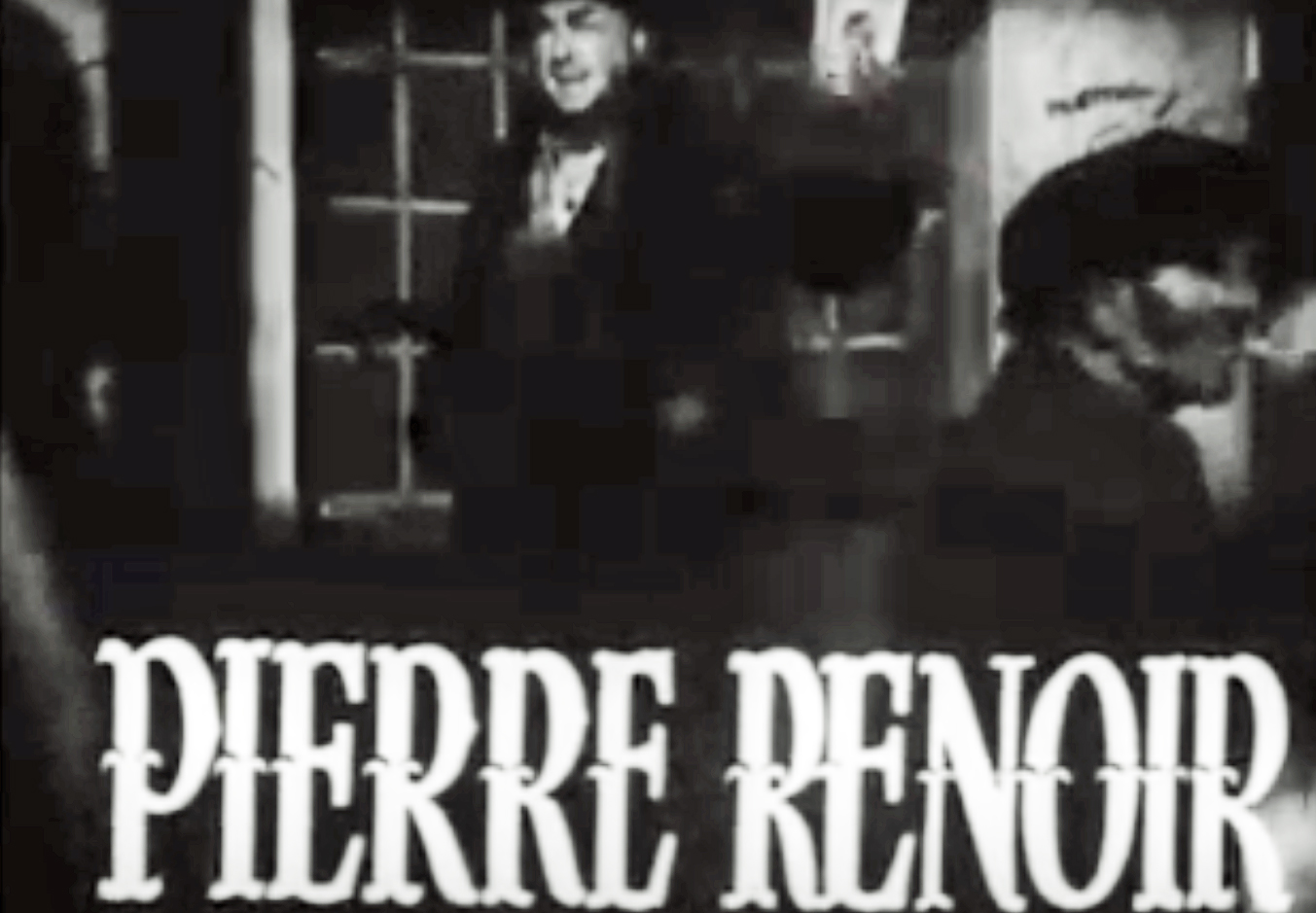
Pierre Renoir in the American trailer for Children of Paradise (1945)

- La Digue (1911, Short) – Pierre Wallen
- Les deux gosses (1916) – Le lieutenant Jacques d'Alboise
- Marion Delorme (1918) – Le roi Louis XIII
- The Whirlpool of Fate (1925) – Farmer
- Morgane, the Enchantress (1928)
- Night at the Crossroads (1932) – Le commissaire Maigret
- The Agony of the Eagles (1933) – Montander
- Madame Bovary (1934) – Charles Bovary
- La Route impériale (1935) – Maj. Hudson
- Tovaritch (1935) – Gorotchenko
- La Bandera (1935) – Le capitaine Weller
- Veille d'armes (1935) – Le commandant Brambourg
- Under Western Eyes (1936) – Un Policier
- Wolves Between Them (1936) – Gottfried Welter
- When Midnight Strikes (1936) – Jean Verdier
- De Man Zonder Hart (1937) – Sourdier
- Widow's Island (1937) – Ralph Berry
- Boissière (1937) – Le général baron von Hubner
- The Citadel of Silence (1937) – Le colonel-comte Stepan Iporievitch
- Mollenard (1938) – Bonnerot
- La Marseillaise (1938) – Le Roi de France Louis XVI
- Légions d'honneur (1938) – L'avocat Dumas
- White Nights in Saint Petersburg (1938) – Ivan Borowsky
- The Lafarge Case (1938) – Charles Lafarge
- The Patriot (1938) – Le comte de Pahlen
- Satan's Paradise (1938) – Paraíso de Satã (1938) – Aristophélès
- La Piste du sud (1938) – Stolberg
- Sirocco (1938) – L'archéologue André Chervin
- The Rebel (1938) – Capitaine Yorritz
- Serge Panine (1939) – Cayrol
- Coral Reefs (1939) – Abboy
- Nord-Atlantique (1939) – Le capitaine Jeff Cooper
- Personal Column (1939) – Brémontière
- Nadia la femme traquée (1940) – Daminoff
- Those of the Sky (1941) – Pierron
- L'embuscade (1941) – Jean Guéret
- The Pavilion Burns (1941) – Jourdinsse
- Foolish Husbands (1941) – Jules Donaldo
- Macao (1942) – Werner von Krall (1942 version only)
- The Law of Spring (1942) – Frédéric Villaret
- The Newspaper Falls at Five O'Clock (1942) – François Marchal
- The Trump Card (1942) – Rudy Score
- L'appel du bled (1942) – Michaud
- The Wolf of the Malveneurs (1943) – Reginald de Malveneur
- Madame et le mort (1943) – Charles de Bruine
- Tornavara (1943) – Sigurd Framrus
- Traveling Light (1944) – Georges Renaud
- Les Enfants du paradis (1945) – Jéricho
- Father Goriot (1945) – Vautrin
- St. Val's Mystery (1945) – Le docteur Dartignac
- Marie la Misère (1945) – Pierre Desormes
- Resistance (1945) – Le colonel
- Special Mission (1946) – Landberg alias Moravetz – le chef du réseau d'espionnage alleman
- The Captain (1946) – Le duc d'Angoulême
- Coincidences (1947) – Monsieur Bardolas
- Les trafiquants de la mer (1947) – Le prince Boris Mentischev
- Secret Cargo (1947) – Le préfet de police
- The Eleven O'Clock Woman (1948) – Le docteur Gérard Pescara
- La grande volière (1948) – Vallette
- Scandal on the Champs-Élysées (1949) – Dominique Airelle
- The Mystery of the Yellow Room (1949) – Professeur Stangerson
- The Farm of Seven Sins (1949) – Le procureur Edmond de Chancey
- The Ferret (1950) – Le docteur Darvel-Juste
- Death Threat (1950) – Bernier
- Dr. Knock (1951) – Le pharmacien Mousquet
- Judgement of God (1952) – Le duc Ernest de Bavière (final film role)
