= Jon Jost =

American independent filmmaker (born 1943)

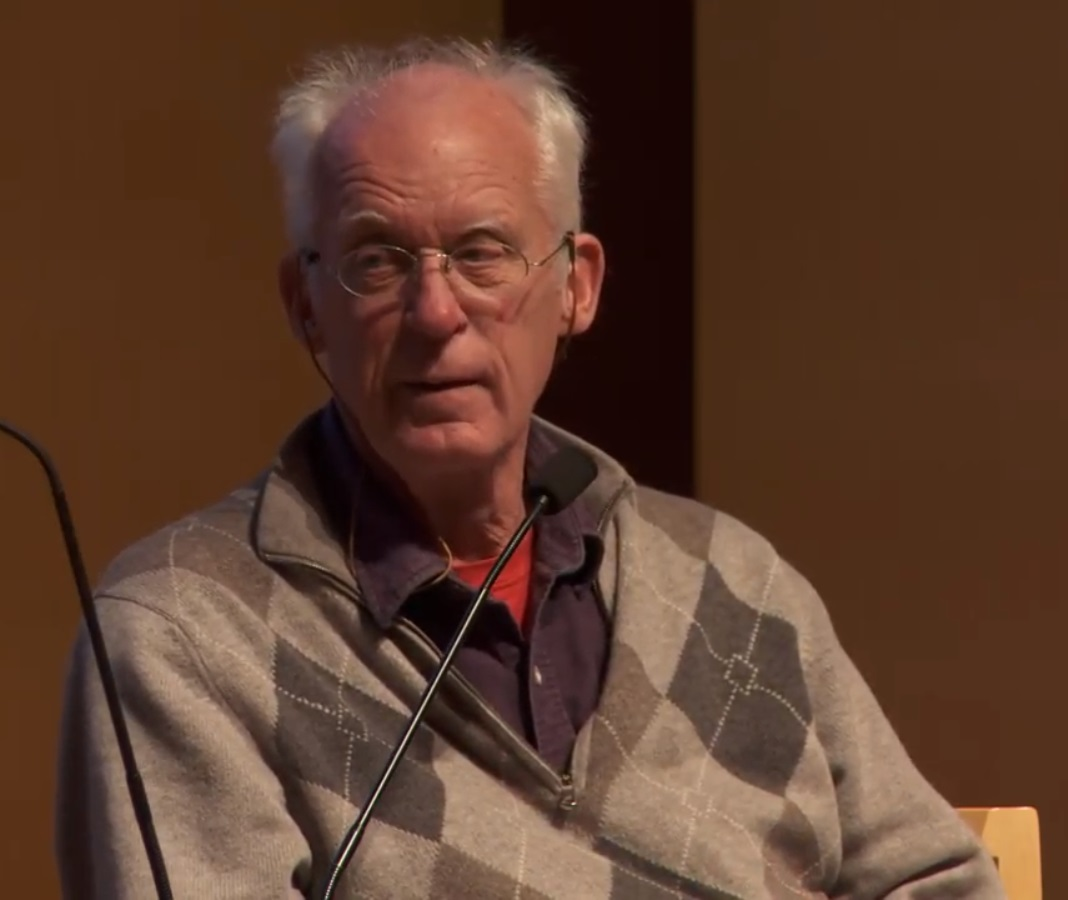
- Born: May 16, 1943 (age 83); Chicago, Illinois, United States
- Occupation: Filmmaker

Jon Stephen Jost (born 16 May 1943) is an American independent filmmaker from Chicago.

Born in Chicago to a military family, Jost grew up in Georgia, Kansas, Japan, Italy, Germany and Virginia. He began making films in January 1963 after being expelled from college.

In 1965 he was imprisoned by US authorities for 2 years and 3 months for refusing to cooperate with the Selective Service System. On his release, he engaged in anti-war activities primarily by working for the draft resistance, Chicago Mobilization, and helped found the Chicago branch of Newsreel, the New Left Film production and distribution group.

== Career ==
A self-taught filmmaker, Jost made his first full-length film in 1974. He has made forty long-form films focused on a wide range of American issues. Jost's work has been screened at major film festivals around the world. The Museum of Modern Art, NYC, screened a complete retrospective of his work from January 18 to February 19, 1991. This program was repeated at the UCLA Film Archive, Los Angeles, (March–April), and partially repeated at the American Film Institute Film Theater at the J.F. Kennedy Center, Washington, DC, (February), the Kabuki Theater in San Francisco under the sponsorship of the Film Arts Foundation and San Francisco Film Society, (March–April), and the Harvard Film Archive, Boston, (April). In October, 1991, the Viennale, in Vienna, Austria, in the context of a broader festival, screened a complete retrospective of Jost's films. It was also screened in January–February 1992 at the Arsenal Kino, Berlin.

In 1994 the Bergamo Film Meeting, Italy, organised a complete retrospective of all features and short films, and published a book and catalog on Mr. Jost and his work. A traveling retrospective was done in the Netherlands by the Filmtheater Desmet in fall 1994; and in December 1994 a complete retrospective was done at the Cinemateca in Bologna, Italy, and in Feb 1995 it was repeated at the Film Museo Nazionale, in Torino. Full retrospectives were mounted in 1996 at the Cinemateca Portuguese and Filmoteca Espanol. In 2011 the Jerusalem Cinematheque did an 11 film partial retrospective, also shown in Haifa and Tel Aviv.

Since 1996 he has worked almost exclusively in digital video (DV & HD), completing twenty-six features and many short films in electronic formats. Two of his most widely known films are All the Vermeers in New York (1990) and The Bed You Sleep In (1993). His 1977 feature, Last Chants for a Slow Dance is listed in the book 1001 Films You Must See Before You Die.

Jost also works in photography and painting, and writes and plays country western songs.

== Personal life ==
After living and teaching in Seoul for 4 years, Jost resigned as a "Distinguished Professor" from Yonsei University, in June 2011, and resumed full-time filmmaking. Jost is presently living in Butte, Montana (2020).

== Filmography ==
=== Feature length films ===
- Speaking Directly (1973)
- Angel City (1976)
- Last Chants for a Slow Dance (1977)
- Chameleon (16 to 35 mm) (1978)
- Stagefright (1981)
- Nightshift (1981)
- Slow Moves (1983)
- Bell Diamond (1986)
- Plain Talk & Common Sense (1987)
- Rembrandt Laughing (1988)
- Sure Fire (super16 to 35 mm) (1990)
- All the Vermeers in New York (35 mm) (1990)
- Frameup (35 mm) (1993)
- The Bed You Sleep In (35 mm) (1993)
- Uno a me, uno a te e uno a Raffaele (35 mm) (1994)
- London Brief (DV) (1997)
- Nas Correntes de Luz da Ria Formosa (DV) (1999)
- 6 Easy Pieces (DV) (2000)
- Roma - un ritratto improvvisario (DV) (2000)
- Muri romani (DV) (2000)
- Oui Non (DV) (2002)
- Vergessensfuge (DV) (2004)
- Homecoming (DV) (2004)
- Chhattisgarh Sketches (DV) (2004)
- Passages (DV) (2004)
- La Lunga Ombra (DV) (2005)
- Over Here (DV) (2007)
- Parable (DV) (2008)
- Rant (DV) (2008)
- Swimming in Nebraska (DV) (2010)
- Imagens de uma cidade perdida (DV) 2011
- Dissonance (DV/HD) 2011
- Trinity (DV/HD) 2011
- The Narcissus Flowers of Katsura-shima (HD) 2012
- Coming to Terms (HD) 2013
- Canyon (HD) 2013
- Bowman Lake (HD) 2014
- They Had It Coming (HD) 2015
- Blue Strait (HD) 2015
- Again & Again (HD) (with Marcella Di Palo) 2012-2018
- Muri Romani II (HD) 2018
- Pequenos Milagres (HD) 2019
- Tourists (HD) 2020
- Deadendz, 68 min, 2012-2023
- Casa do silencio (HD) 2024

=== Short films ===
- Portrait, 1963
- Repetition, 1963
- Chalma, 1964
- Sunday, 1964
- City, 1964
- We Didn't Go to Unique's, 1965
- Judith, 1965
- Leah, 1967
- Traps, 1967
- 13 Fragments & 3 Narratives from Life, 1968
- Susannah's Film, 1969
- Flower, 1970
- Canyon, 1970
- Fall Creek, 1970
- A Man Is More Than The Sum of His Parts/A Woman Is, 1971
- Primaries/A Turning Point in Lunatic China/1, 2, 3 Four, 1971
- X2: Two Dances by Nancy Karp, 1980
- Beauty Sells Best, 1978
- Godard 80, 1980
- Water Song #1, 1998
- Adrift, 2001
- Til Edvard, 2001
- Vera x 3, 2001
- Dharma Does As Dharma Do, 2001
- Water Song #2, 2001
- Fugue, 2002
- FUNKIES - 10 Electronic Paintings, 2003
- Tanti Auguri, 2002
- A Walk Through Waseda Garden, 2004
- A View of Mount Baker from Port Angeles, Wa. [For Hokusai], 2004
- San Lorenzo, 2006, 12 mins, Italy
- Mr Right, 2009, 30 mins, Seoul S Korea
- AMTRAK, 2009, 27 mins, USA
- Canyon, 2013, 24 mins, USA (short version)
- Stand, 2016, 30 mins, USA
- Mountains As Mountains Landscape for Watanabe Shiko, 13 mins USA 2017
- Requiem, 13:30, USA 2018
- 30/30 Vision: 3 Decades of Strand Releasing (segment "Jon Jost"), 1:50, USA 2020
- On the Strait, 6:40, USA 2020
- Walking the Dogs, 1.40, USA 2020
- Spectral Passage, 6:30, USA 2020
- Luminous Landscape, 6:40, USA 2020
- July 4, 3:10, USA 2020
- And a butterfly, 2:50, USA 2020
- I have a friend who hates windchimes, 1:05 USA 2020
- Red Frame, 4:03, USA 2020
- Veils, 10:30, USA 2020
- Brambles, 4:45, USA 2020
- The Field, (A Dance),2:38 USA 2020
- The Symphony, 2:02, USA 2020
- Punta Secca, 9:05, ITALY 2020
- My Life as a Midge, 6:28, USA 2020
