= Night at the Crossroads (novel) =

1931 Novel by Georges Simenon

- First edition
- Author: Georges Simenon
- Original title: (Fr.) La Nuit du Carrefour
- Language: French
- Series: Inspector Jules Maigret
- Genre: Detective fiction
- Published: 1931
- Publisher: Fayard
- Publication place: France
- Media type: Print
- Preceded by: The Yellow Dog
- Followed by: A Crime in Holland

Night at the Crossroads (French: La Nuit du Carrefour) is a detective novel by the Belgian writer Georges Simenon. Published in 1931, it is the sixth novel featuring Detective Chief Inspector Maigret of the judicial police. Maigret investigates the murder of a diamond merchant at a rural crossroads in the Essonne department. It has been translated into English three times and adapted for film and television four times.

== Plot ==
Isaac Goldberg, a diamond merchant from Antwerp, is found shot dead in the garage of Carl Andersen, a Dane living with his sister Else at a crossroads near Avrainville. The body was found in the car of Andersen's neighbour, Émile Michonnet. Andersen's car was found in Michonnet's garage. Carl and Else fled the scene and were arrested in Paris. Detective Chief Inspector Maigret of the judicial police interrogates Carl, who claims he does not know why Michonnet's car and the body were in his garage.

Maigret and Detective Lucas travel to the crossroads where there are only four buildings: the home of the Andersens; the home of Émile Michonnet and his wife; an automotive workshop; and the home of the owners of the workshop, Monsieur Oscar and his wife. Maigret interviews Else, who says she did not know Goldberg, and it was Carl's idea to flee to Paris.

Madame Goldberg arrives and is shot dead as she steps out of her car. Maigret chases the shooter through the fields but loses him.

Next morning, Carl drives to Paris on business. Maigret enters the Andersen's house using a skeleton key and finds a pair of Carl's shoes that match footprints left at the scene of Madame Goldberg's murder. Else tells him that Carl locks her in when he is away because she is afraid of intruders. She and Carl are from a rich family in Denmark, but were ruined financially three years ago. Carl insisted on moving to the crossroads for privacy's sake.

Carl does not arrive in Paris; his abandoned car is found near the Belgian border. The Belgian police inform Maigret that Goldberg was suspected of trafficking jewellery. Maigret learns that Oscar and his wife plan to stay in Paris overnight and that Michonnet is housebound with gout.

Having arranged for police to keep watch on all the houses, Maigret visits Else. He finds a pistol, barbiturates and a key hidden in her room. Else says she was afraid Carl was going mad, so she had a spare key for her room made. She bought the gun for protection and barbiturates to help her sleep. She drinks some beer and collapses. Suspecting poisoning, Maigret induces vomiting and she recovers. He hears a gunshot, and Lucas tells him that Carl has been shot in the garden. Carl is brought inside and says that on his way to Paris, a man talked his way into his car and shot him. He managed to get back home but was shot again.

Maigret sees a mechanic put a spare wheel in the back of a lorry that stopped at Oscar's workshop. Noticing that the wheel is too small, Maigret goes into the workshop and finds drugs and valuables hidden in tyres and cars. A car driven by Oscar drives by and its occupants shoot at Maigret, missing him. Maigret discovers that Michonnet and Else are missing, but they are soon found wrestling for her revolver in a dry well behind her house.

Oscar and his accomplices are arrested and brought to Carl and Else's home. Maigret questions the suspects and learns that Else is really Bertha Krull and was once involved in a bank robbery in Copenhagen. She met Carl when he helped her escape the police. A devout Christian, Carl wanted to save her soul and eventually married her. He took her to the crossroads from fear that her former accomplices would find her. Else grew tired of Carl's possessiveness and started an affair with Oscar who told her how he used his workshop to fence stolen goods. She then seduced Michonnet so he would cooperate with the gang. She knew Goldberg from her previous criminal career and offered to buy stolen jewellery from him.

Maigret alleges Oscar and Else decided to kill Goldberg and plant Michonnet's car and the body in Carl's garage to incriminate Carl. Else drugged Carl with barbiturates so he slept through the night of the murder. A gang member put on Carl's shoes and shot Madame Goldberg. The gang intended to kill Carl on his way to Paris and hide his body so the police would think he had fled to Belgium. Michonnet, realising that Else had played him for a fool, tried to poison her and shot Carl when he returned home. Madame Michonnet saw Maigret investigating Oscar's workshop, so warned Oscar by telephone.

Oscar, Else and Michonnet are jailed for their crimes. The gang member Guido is guillotined for the murders.

== Other titles ==
The novel was originally published in French as La Nuit du Carrefour by Fayard in Paris in 1931. It was the sixth novel Simenon wrote in the inspector Maigret series. It was first translated into English by Anthony Abbott and published as The Crossroads Murders by Hurst and Blackett in London in 1933. It was translated again by Robert Baldick in 1963 and published as Maigret at the Crossroads by Penguin. In 2014 Penguin published a new translation by Linda Coverdale, titled Night at the Crossroads.

== In other media ==
The novel was filmed as La Nuit du Carrefour in 1932, directed by Jean Renoir and starring the director's brother Pierre Renoir as Inspector Maigret. It was adapted for television in 1962 as The Crooked Castle in the BBC 1960-63 series starring Rupert Davies; in 1992 as Maigret et la nuit du carrefour in the 1991-2004 French-language TV series starring Bruno Cremer; and in 2017 in the ITV series, starring Rowan Atkinson.

== Bibliography ==
- Marnham, Patrick (1994). The Man Who Wasn't Maigret, A Portrait of Georges Simenon. Harcourt Brace & Company. ISBN 0-15-600059-8.
- Forshaw, Barry (2022). Simenon: the Man, the Books, the Films, a 21st Century Guide. Harpenden, UK: Oldcastle Books. ISBN 9780857305145.
- Simenon, Georges (2014). Night at the Crossroads. Translated by Coverdale, Linda. London: Penguin. ISBN 9780241684771.
- Wenger, Murielle; Trussel, Stephen (2017). Maigret's World: A Reader's Companion to Simenon's Famous Detective. Jefferson, North Carolina: McFarland & Company. ISBN 978-1-4766-2925-4.
- Young, Trudee (1976). Georges Simenon, a checklist of his 'Maigret' and other mystery novels and short stories in French and in English translations. Metuchen, N.J.: The Scarecrow Press. ISBN 0-8108-0964-8.
