= King Cophetua and the Beggar Maid (painting) =

Painting by Edward Burne-Jones

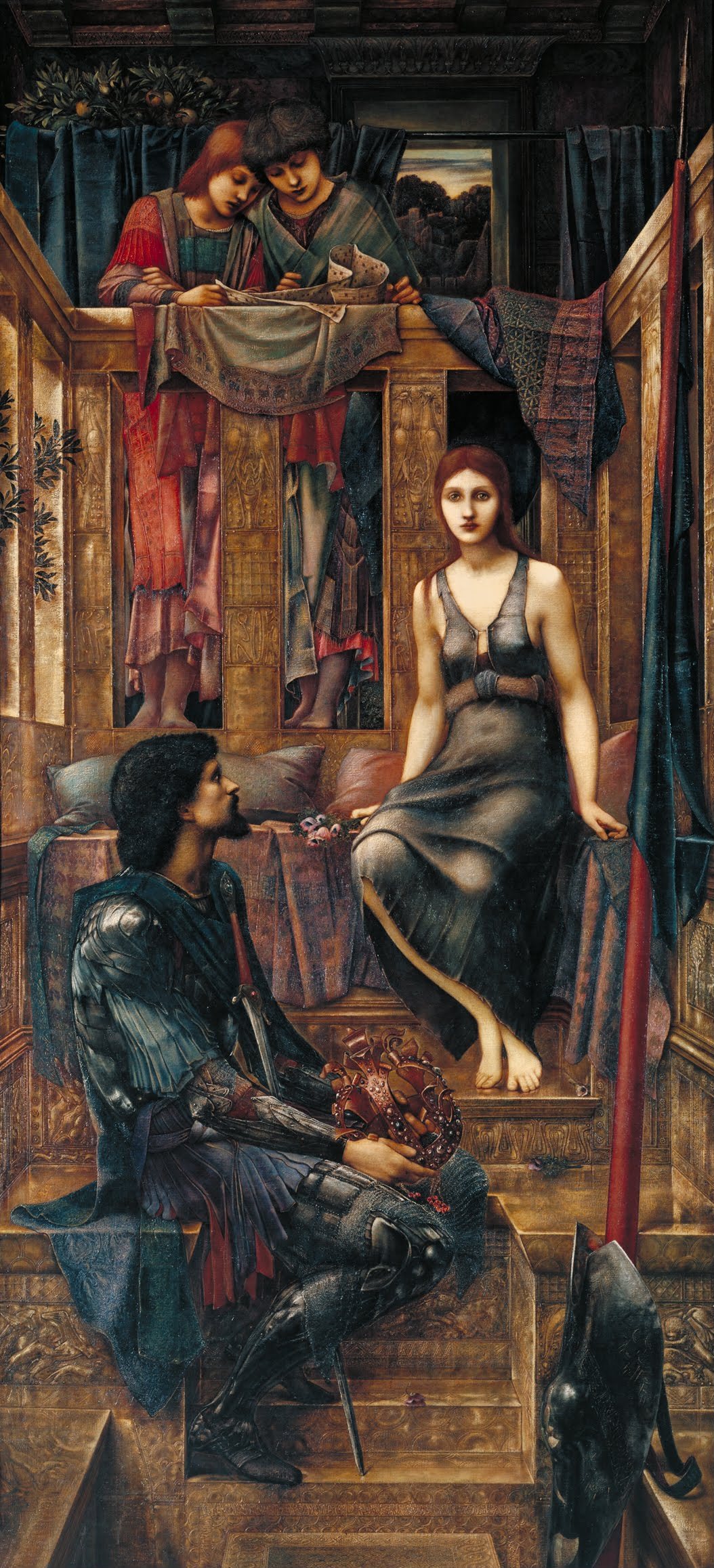
- Artist: Edward Burne-Jones
- Year: 1884
- Medium: Oil on panel
- Dimensions: 293.4 cm × 135.9 cm (115.5 in × 53.5 in)
- Location: Tate Britain, London

King Cophetua and the Beggar Maid is an 1884 painting by the Pre-Raphaelite artist Edward Burne-Jones. The painting illustrates the story of 'The King and the Beggar-maid", which tells the legend of the prince Cophetua who fell in love at first sight with the beggar Penelophon. The tale was familiar to Burne-Jones through an Elizabethan ballad published in Bishop Thomas Percy's 1765 Reliques of Ancient English Poetry and the sixteen-line poem The Beggar Maid by Alfred, Lord Tennyson.

Burne-Jones first attempted the story in an oil painting of 1861–62 (now in the Tate Gallery, London). He was working out a new composition around 1874 or 1875, and began the painting in earnest in 1881. He worked on it through the winter of 1883–84, declaring it finished in April 1884.

The composition is influenced by Andrea Mantegna's Madonna della Vittoria (1496). Several studies for the final work survive. A small gouache (bodycolour) of c. 1883 (now in the collection of Andrew Lloyd Webber) shows the king and the beggar maid much closer together, and a full-scale cartoon in bodycolour and coloured chalks of the same year (now in the Birmingham Museum and Art Gallery) features an entirely different approach to lighting the figures.

External videos
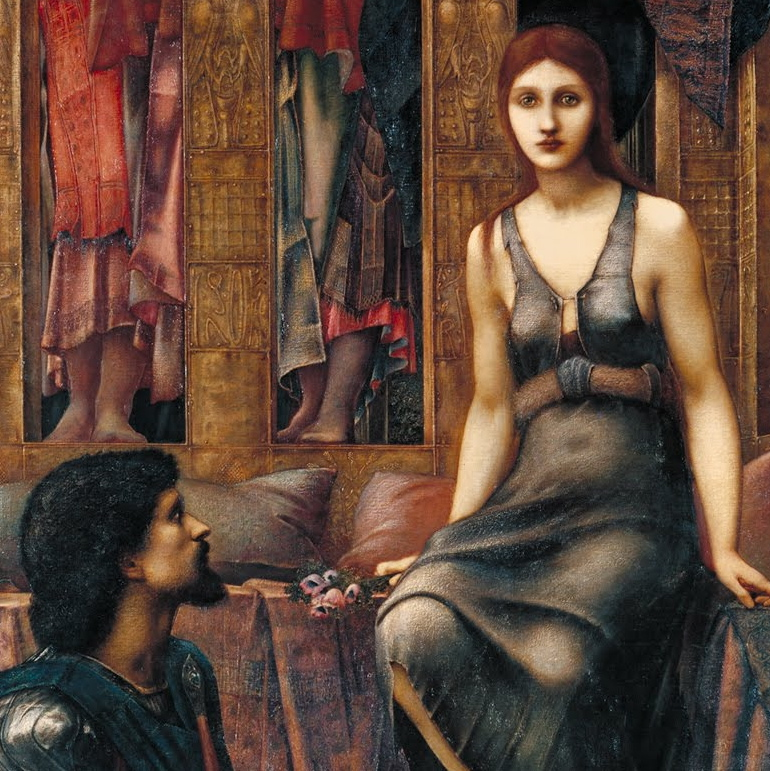
- Smarthistory – King Cophetua and the Beggar Maid

King Cophetua was exhibited at the Grosvenor Gallery in 1884 and became Burne-Jones's greatest success of the 1880s for its technical execution and its themes of power and wealth overborne by beauty and simplicity. It was heralded as the "picture of the year" by The Art Journal and "not only the finest work Mr. Burne-Jones has ever painted, but one of the finest pictures ever painted by an Englishman" by The Times. The painting was exhibited in France in 1889, where its popularity earned Burne-Jones the Legion of Honour and began a vogue for his work. The artist's wife Georgiana Burne-Jones felt "this picture contained more of Edward's own qualities than any other he did."

The painting was purchased by the Earl of Wharncliffe (d. 1899) and acquired by public subscription through the Burne-Jones Memorial Fund from his executors in 1900. It is now in Tate Britain. The full-scale cartoon was acquired for Birmingham in 1947.

The painting is referenced in Chapter 4 of Anthony Powell's Books do Furnish a Room, the tenth installment of A Dance to the Music of Time, as a visual set-up for the confrontation between X Trapnel and Kenneth Widmerpool in the former's digs in bombed out Little Venice circa 1947. Pamela Widmerpool is envisioned as the Beggar Maid. The painting is also mentioned in the story "The Beggar Maid" by Alice Munro, where Patrick compares Rose to the Beggar Maid, and Rose then looks at the picture only to realize how unlike King Cophetua Patrick would ever be, and how impossible their marriage would be (which turns out to be the case). It also merits a mention in A.N. Wilson's novel "Kindly Light." In Julia, Peter Straub's first horror novel, Mark tells the title character that she has always reminded him of the beggar maid in the painting. Julia goes to the Tate Gallery to look at the painting, silently agreeing that she does resemble the maid (and fancying that the king looks like Mark).

== Studies ==
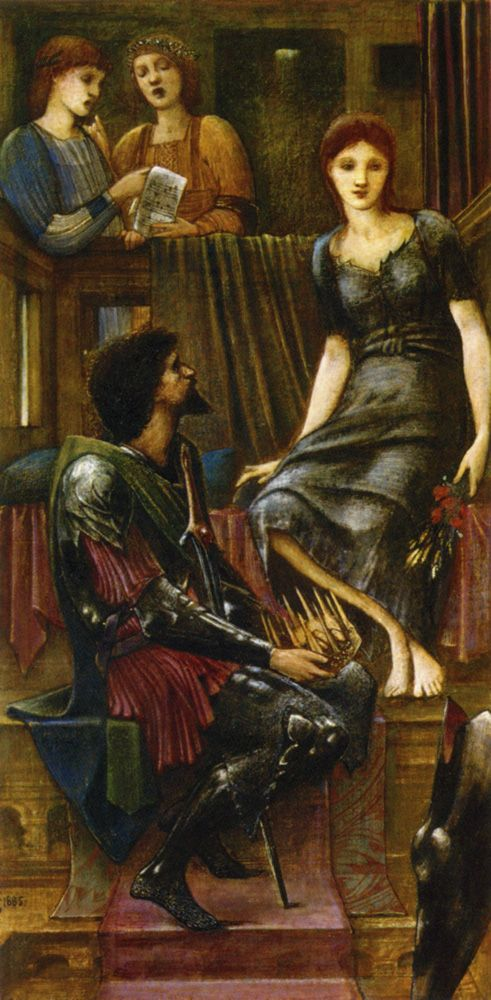
Sketch in gouache, 1883 (owned by Andrew Lloyd Webber)

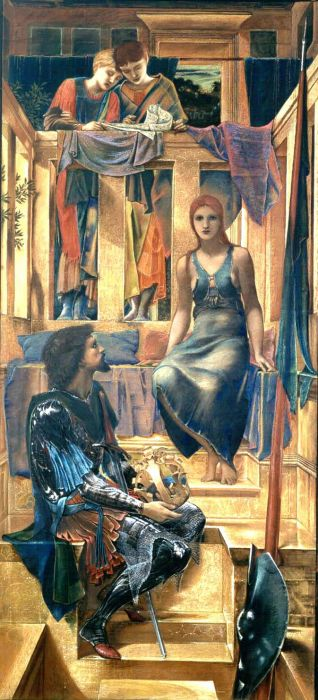
Full-size cartoon, 1883 (Birmingham)

== See also ==
- List of paintings by Edward Burne-Jones
- Tate Britain's listing
