= Night at the Crossroads (film) =

1932 film directed by Jean Renoir

- Title card from the film
- Directed by: Jean Renoir
- Written by: Jean Renoir
- Based on: Night at the Crossroads (1931 novel) by Georges Simenon
- Starring: Pierre Renoir; Winna Winifried
- Cinematography: Georges Asselin; Marcel Lucien
- Edited by: Marguerite Renoir
- Production company: Europa-Films
- Distributed by: Compagnie Franco Coloniale Cinématographique
- Release date: 18 April 1932 (Paris)
- Running time: 74 minutes
- Country: France
- Language: French

Night at the Crossroads (French: La Nuit du carrefour) is a 1932 French crime film by Jean Renoir, based on the novel of the same title by Georges Simenon and starring Renoir's brother Pierre Renoir as Simenon's popular detective, Jules Maigret.

The French director Jacques Becker, then apprentice to Renoir, worked as assistant director and production manager on the film.

== Plot ==
The story concentrates on a gang of thieves who utilize a cross-road garage as the hideaway.

== Cast ==
- Pierre Renoir as Inspector Jules Maigret
- Winna Winifried as Else Anderson
- Georges Koudria as Carl Anderson
- Georges Térof as Lucas
- André Dignimont as Oscar
- Georges André-Martin as Granjean
- Jean Gehret as Emile Michonnet
- Michel Duran as Jojo
- Manuel Raaby as Guido
- Max Dalban as Doctor
- Roger Gaillard as Butcher
- Boulicot as Gendarme
- Jean Mitry as Arsène
- Jane Pierson as Mme Michonnet
- Lucie Vallat as Michelle

== Reputation and influence ==
Often cited as being Jean Renoir's least well-known sound film, Night at the Crossroads has nonetheless maintained a very strong critical reputation. In an article republished as part of André Bazin's book on Renoir, the French New Wave critic and filmmaker Jean-Luc Godard described it as being "Renoir's most mysterious film" and "the only great French detective movie--in fact, the greatest of all adventure movies."

At a symposium on the Hungarian filmmaker Béla Tarr held at Facets Multimedia on 16 September 2007, American film critic Jonathan Rosenbaum mentioned that Tarr's then-new feature, The Man from London (also based on a novel by Georges Simenon), was influenced by Night at the Crossroads.

== See also ==
- List of French films of 1932
