= Gabriele Ferzetti =

Italian actor (1925–2015)

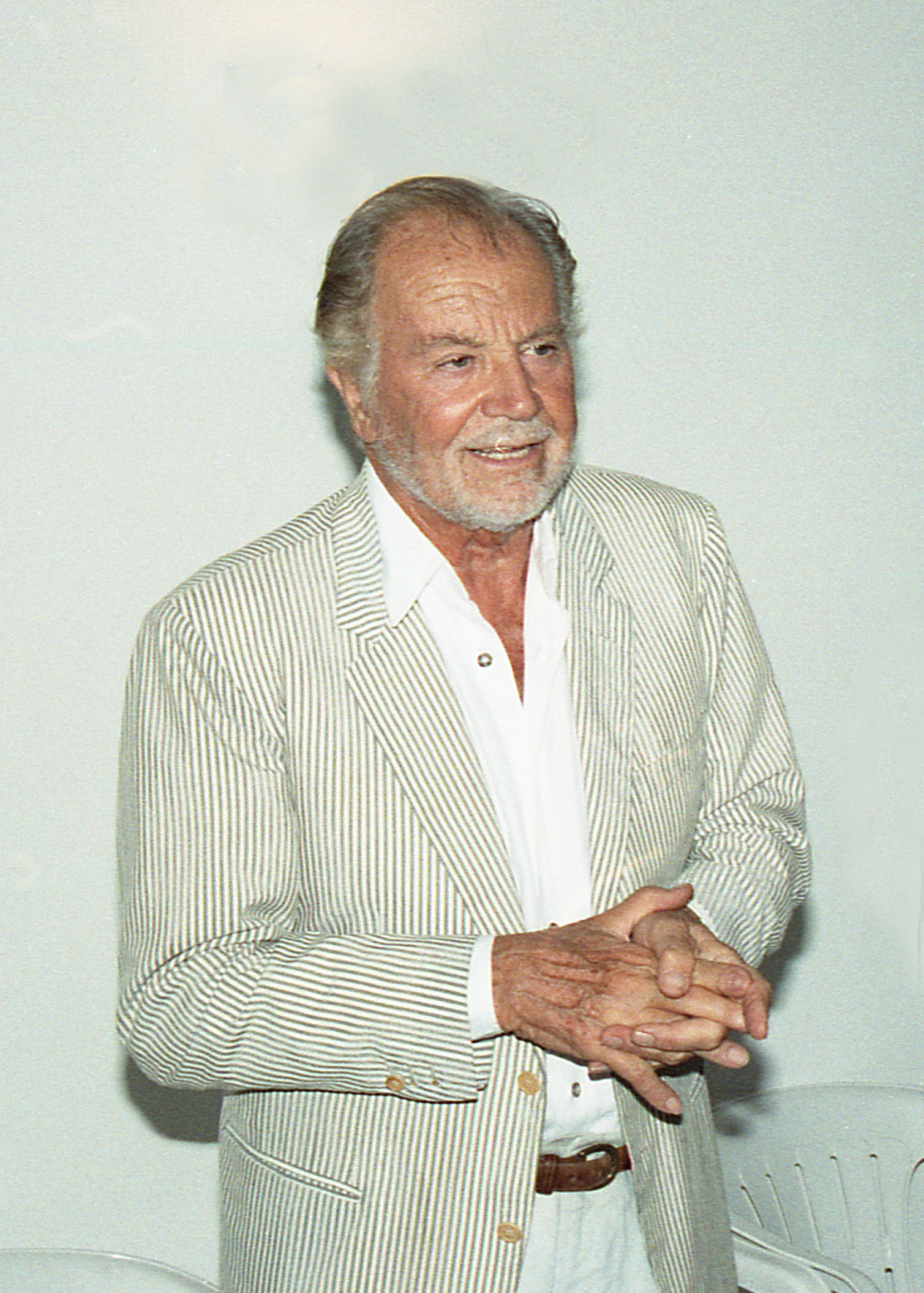
- Ferzetti in 1998
- Born: Pasquale Ferzetti; 17 March 1925; Rome, Kingdom of Italy
- Died: 2 December 2015 (aged 90); Rome, Italy
- Occupation: Actor
- Years active: 1942–2015
- Children: Anna Ferzetti

Gabriele Ferzetti (born Pasquale Ferzetti; 17 March 1925 – 2 December 2015) was an Italian actor with more than 160 credits across film, television and stage. He made his international breakthrough in Michelangelo Antonioni's L'Avventura (1960) as a restless playboy. After a series of romantic performances, he acquired a reputation in Italy as an elegant, debonair, and somewhat aristocratic looking leading man.

Ferzetti's first leading role was in the film Lo Zappatore (1950). He portrayed Puccini twice in the films Puccini (1953) and House of Ricordi (1954), and starred as Lot in John Huston's biblical epic, The Bible: In the Beginning... (1966). Internationally, two of his best-known roles included railroad baron Morton in Sergio Leone's Once Upon a Time in the West (1968) and mob boss Marc Ange Draco in the James Bond movie On Her Majesty's Secret Service (1969).

He was perhaps best known to non-mainstream audiences for his role as the psychiatrist, Hans, in Liliana Cavani's The Night Porter (1974). In the 1970s, he also appeared in a significant number of poliziotteschi, often as a police inspector. Later in his career, he played the role of Nono in the TV series Une famille formidable, while also appearing in Luca Guadagnino's 2009 film I Am Love.

Ferzetti twice won the Nastro d'Argento for Best Supporting Actor, for The Wayward Wife (1953) and We Still Kill the Old Way (1967). He was also a Premi Flaiano recipient and a David di Donatello nominee.

== Early life ==
Ferzetti was born as Pasquale Ferzetti in Rome, Italy on 17 March 1925. He studied at the Accademia d'Arte Drammatica in Rome, but was expelled.

== Career ==
=== 1940s ===
Ferzetti made his screen debut in Via delle Cinque Lune (1942) under the directorship of Luigi Chiarini, featuring actors such as Luisella Beghi, Olga Solbelli, Andrea Checchi, and Gildo Bocci. Uncredited for his next role in Bengasi, he was credited for Flavio Calzavara's La contessa Castiglione (also from 1942). He then took a break from film acting, instead making a succession of theatrical appearances until a small role in Lost Happiness (Felicità perduta, 1946) and Riccardo Freda's Les Misérables (uncredited, 1948). After a small role as a pilot in Flying Squadron (Rondini in volo, 1949) and a role in Sicilian Uprising (Vespro siciliano, also from 1949), a historic film set in 1282 during the War of the Sicilian Vespers, he appeared alongside Elli Parvo, Piero Lulli, Charles Vanel, and Marcello Mastroianni in Luigi Capuano's Vertigine d'amore and Fabiola (both from 1949) as Claudio. The antiquity drama, set in Rome, was warmly received. In 1948, he starred in a stage production of As You Like It directed by Luchino Visconti, at the Teatro Eliseo in Rome.

=== 1950s ===
Ferzetti opposite Gina Lollobrigida in The Wayward Wife (La Provinciale, 1953)

Ferzetti had a supporting role in Flavio Calzavara's Sigillo rosso alongside Gino Cervi and Carla Del Poggio, but his first leading role came in Lo Zappatore (both from 1950), a film which focused on the life of peasants and farm workers during the interwar and great depression period. Roles now came in abundance for Ferzetti, from the crime comedy Welcome, Reverend! (Benvenuto, reverendo!, 1950) alongside Aldo Fabrizi, Massimo Girotti, and Lianella Carell, to Luis Trenker's film Barrier to the North (1950), to Guido Brignone's The Naked and the Wicked (Core 'ngrato, 1951) and Inganno (1952), to Curzio Malaparte's drama, The Forbidden Christ (Il Cristo proibito, 1951), to Antonio Pietrangeli's Empty Eyes (Il sole negli occhi, 1953). He starred in the successful biopic of composer Puccini under Carmine Gallone, Puccini (also 1953), and reprised the role in House of Ricordi (1954), also featuring Roland Alexandre as Gioacchino Rossini. Ferzetti starred in Mario Soldati's The Wayward Wife (La Provinciale, 1953), a Cannes Film Festival nominee for best film, which saw him play the role of a professor who falls in love with a glamorous star (Gina Lollobrigida). This comedy drama involves the tale of a Romanian countess who forces "Gemma" to become a prostitute. For his performance, Ferzetti received an award from the Italian National Syndicate of Film Journalists, and further cemented his status as a leading actor in Italy by appearing alongside Lollobrigida. Ferzetti appeared in Marcello Pagliero's comedy drama based on the play by Luigi Pirandello, Vestire gli ignudi (1954), playing the character of Ludovico Nota alongside Pierre Brasseur, Manlio Busoni, and Paolo Ferrara, and in Camilla (also 1954), under the directorship of Luciano Emmer.

Ferzetti starred in Michelangelo Antonioni's The Girlfriends (Le Amiche, 1955), as a downbeat, struggling artist named Lorenzo, with Eleonora Rossi Drago, Franco Fabrizi, and Valentina Cortese in the other leading roles. The film, shot on location in Turin, was adapted from Cesare Pavese's novella Tra donne sole (1949). Around the same time, he starred in Un po' di cielo (also from 1955), directed by Giorgio Moser, and Donatella (1956) opposite Elsa Martinelli, under director Mario Monicelli. The film was screened at the 6th Berlin International Film Festival. Ferzetti appeared in the crime film, Parola di ladro (1957), for directors Nanni Loy and Gianni Puccini, opposite Abbe Lane, Nadia Gray, and Andrea Checchi. He later appeared in Antonio Pietrangeli's Souvenir d'Italie, a romantic comedy which saw him feature alongside June Laverick, Isabelle Corey, and Ingeborg Schöner. Ferzetti appeared in Angel in a Taxi (1958), directed by Antonio Leonviola, followed by Racconti d'estate, under the directorship of Gianni Franciolini, based on a story by Alberto Moravia. Ferzetti was cast in this romantic comedy, set in the Tigullio Gulf, alongside Alberto Sordi, Michèle Morgan, Marcello Mastroianni, Sylva Koscina, Dorian Gray, Franca Marzi, Franco Fabrizi, and Jorge Mistral. In 1959, Ferzetti starred alongside Andrée Debar and Isa Miranda as Bernard Turquet de Mayenne in the French historical comedy, Le secret du Chevalier d'Éon. Directed by Jacqueline Audry, the film is set in Burgundy in 1728. He later appeared in Carlo Ludovico Bragaglia's Hannibal, alongside Victor Mature, Rita Gam, Milly Vitale, and Rik Battaglia. The film is set during the Roman Republic; Ferzetti played Fabius Maximus.

=== 1960s ===
Ferzetti alongside Lea Massari in L'avventura (1960)

Ferzetti starred in Gianni Puccini's Il carro armato dell'8 settembre (1960), followed by Florestano Vancini's Long Night in 1943 (both 1960). The latter film was set during the Allied invasion of Italy in 1943 during the Second World War, and saw Ferzetti feature alongside Belinda Lee and Enrico Maria Salerno. It was a considerable success at the Venice Film Festival and was nominated for a Goldon Lion Award. He made his international breakthrough as an oversexed, restless playboy, Sandro, in Michelangelo Antonioni's L'Avventura (also 1960). Starring alongside Lea Massari and Monica Vitti romantically, his role was well received. Liz-Anne Bawden in The Oxford Companion to Film said, "The acting is excellent. Gabriele Ferzetti repeats and develops his role from Le Amiche of the inadequate male/artist".

Ferzetti in Long Night in 1943 (La lunga notte del '43), 1960

Ferzetti entered one of the busiest periods of his career, featuring in seven films released during 1962. Among these were Il giorno più corto, directed by Sergio Corbucci, in Giuseppe Bennati's Congo vivo alongside Jean Seberg, in Jean Negulesco's American picture, Jessica, opposite Maurice Chevalier, Angie Dickinson, and Noël-Noël, and in Le Crime ne paie pas (US: Crime Does Not Pay) under director Gérard Oury. Among a large ensemble cast, Ferzetti had a role in Jean Delannoy's Imperial Venus (1963), and played the character of Leonardi in Charles Frend and Bruno Vailati's war drama, Torpedo Bay (also 1963), alongside Lilli Palmer, James Mason, and Alberto Lupo.

In Luis Lucia's musical comedy, Crucero de verano (1964), he appeared alongside Carmen Sevilla, Marisa Merlini, and José Alfayate and in Lo scippo (1965), alongside Paolo Ferrari, and played the role of Vic Dermatt in Jacques Deray's French crime drama, Par un beau matin d'été (Crime on a Summer Morning, also 1965), alongside Jean-Paul Belmondo, Sophie Daumier, and Geraldine Chaplin. He also had a role in Marcel Carné's Trois chambres à Manhattan (Three Rooms in Manhattan, 1965), a film which incidentally featured a young Robert De Niro in an uncredited role.

Ferzetti began to work on American projects. He starred as Lot in John Huston's biblical epic, The Bible: In the Beginning... (1966), based on the Book of Genesis. He also made his television debut with his appearance in two episodes of the American spy series, I Spy. Ferzetti starred in A ciascuno il suo (We Still Kill the Old Way, 1967) under director Elio Petri, and the TV series Dossier Mata Hari. Ferzetti featured in a total of eight films released in 1968, including Marcello Fondato's I protagonisti, Salvatore Samperi's Come Play with Me, José María Forqué's A Devil Under the Pillow, Roberto Faenza's Escalation, Alberto De Martino's Bandits in Rome, and Sergio Leone's western epic, Once Upon a Time in the West, in which he played Morton, the railroad baron, opposite acclaimed actors Henry Fonda and Charles Bronson.

Ferzetti as Marc-Ange Draco in On Her Majesty's Secret Service (1969)

In 1969, Ferzetti starred in Giuliano Montaldo's crime film, Machine Gun McCain. The film was entered into the 1969 Cannes Film Festival.

He next starred in That Splendid November, directed by Mauro Bolognini. The film, based on a novel by Ercole Patti, united Ferzetti and Gina Lollobrigida once again in the leading roles. Ferzetti's most important performance in 1969, and arguably the role he is most associated with, internationally, was his role as distinguished organized crime boss Marc-Ange Draco in the 1969 James Bond feature On Her Majesty's Secret Service.

Directed by Peter Hunt, Ferzetti plays the father of Tracy di Vicenzo (Diana Rigg), who promises James Bond (George Lazenby) a handsome dowry for marrying her; they fall in love and marry anyway. Hunt had spotted Ferzetti in an Italian film, which he and Harry Saltzman were supposed to be reviewing another actor in, and both were immediately drawn to Ferzetti and persuaded the producers to test Ferzetti. However, despite speaking good English, his lines were dubbed by British actor David de Keyser, due to Ferzetti's strong Italian accent. In the end of the film, his character Draco's resources are vital in aiding Bond to destroy Ernst Stavro Blofeld's base at Piz Gloria. His final release of 1969 was L'amica, directed by Alberto Lattuada.

=== 1970s ===
In 1970, Ferzetti starred in the political thriller, The Confession, opposite Yves Montand and Simone Signoret, under director Costa-Gavras. The film, based on the book by Lise London, explores the mental tortures facing the vice-minister of the Foreign Affairs of Czechoslovakia when he is imprisoned. The film was nominated for a Golden Globe Award. Ferzetti starred as an inspector in the crime picture, Cannabis, directed by Pierre Koralnik. The film involves the American mafia and a group of French drug lords. He also had an uncredited role in Terence Young's American picture, Cold Sweat. In 1971, Ferzetti featured in Salvatore Samperi's Million Dollar Eel, a comedy film about an heiress who fakes her own kidnapping and hides in the river Po's delta, in order to obtain money from her parents. In 1972, Ferzetti starred opposite Robert Blake, Catherine Spaak, and Ernest Borgnine in Franco Prosperi's boxing drama, Ripped Off. A series of appearances in crime films followed, including Doppia coppia con Regina, Trois milliards sans ascenseur (1972), and Hospitals: The White Mafia (1973), directed by Luigi Zampa.

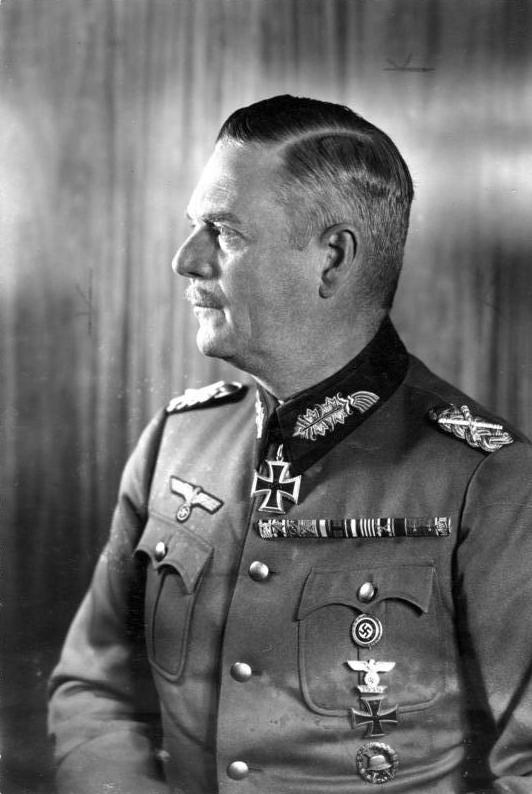
Ferzetti played Wilhelm Keitel (pictured) in Hitler: The Last Ten Days

In 1973, Ferzetti appeared in the TV movie, Divorce His, Divorce Hers, under Waris Hussein, and Hitler: The Last Ten Days, a British-Italian produced picture directed by Ennio De Concini. Ferzetti played the role of Field Marshal Wilhelm Keitel opposite Alec Guinness (Adolf Hitler), Simon Ward, Adolfo Celi, and Diane Cilento. The following year of 1974, he again appeared in a World War II picture, this time the controversial arthouse classic about the Holocaust, The Night Porter, working under director Liliana Cavani. He starred alongside Dirk Bogarde and Charlotte Rampling and played Hans, a psychiatrist, one of his most notable roles. The film depicts the political continuity between wartime Nazism and post-war Europe, and the psychological continuity of characters locked into compulsive repetition of the past. Given the film's dark and disturbing themes, and a somewhat ambiguous moral clarification at the end, The Night Porter has tended to divide audiences and was accused of mere sensationalism. Film critic Roger Ebert said, "as nasty as it is lubricious, a despicable attempt to titillate us by exploiting memories of persecution and suffering."

Ferzetti continued to appear in crime films, including Calling All Police Cars (1975), directed by Mario Caiano, the German detective thriller Der Richter und sein Henker (1975), directed by Maximilian Schell, Eriprando Visconti's La Orca (1976), and Fernando Di Leo's Gli amici di Nick Hezard, a film about a Swiss heist. He also appeared in French director Roger Pigaut's picture, Le guêpier, opposite Claude Brasseur and Marthe Keller, and had a small role in Vincente Minnelli's fantasy, A Matter of Time in 1976, which featured a prominent cast, which included Ingrid Bergman and Liza Minnelli. In 1977, he starred in Eriprando Visconti's Oedipus Orca, and Lucio Fulci's The Psychic, about a clairvoyant woman (Jennifer O'Neill), who after having a vision, removes a section of the wall in the home of her husband (Ferzetti) and finds a skeleton behind it. In 1978, Ferzetti appeared in French director Claude d'Anna's picture, CIA contro KGB, alongside Bruno Cremer, Donald Pleasence, Laure Dechasnel, Hélène Lehman, Dennis Hopper, and Joseph Cotten. He also appeared in another French picture, the romantic drama Mon premier amour, directed by Elie Chouraqui. In 1979, Ferzetti starred in Porci con la P 38, directed by Gianfranco Pagani, Gli anni struggenti, directed by Vittorio Sindoni, Encounters in the Deep, directed by Anthony Richmond and Tonino Ricci, and also had an uncredited role in Terence Young's Bloodline. He also appeared in the TV series I vecchi e i giovani.

=== 1980s–2015 ===
Ferzetti played a Turkish brigadier in another of Young's pictures, the historical war film, Inchon (1981), with Laurence Olivier as General Douglas MacArthur. He appeared in Vatican Conspiracy (1982) directed by Marcello Aliprandi, and starred alongside Franco Nero in the crime comedy, Grog (also 1982), directed by Francesco Laudadio, about two convicts who escape from prison and takes the family of a doctor as hostages.

In the mid-1980s, as he came closer to retirement age, Ferzetti's career in film began to decline, mainly appearing in low-budget TV movies and mini series, including an uncredited role in The Scarlet and the Black (1983) under Jerry London, and the mini-series Quo Vadis? (1985), La voglia di vincere (1987), and Around the World in 80 Days (1989). His only other films of the period were Julia and Julia (1987), directed by Peter Del Monte, in which he starred alongside Kathleen Turner, Gabriel Byrne, and Sting, and Computron 22, directed by Giuliano Carnimeo (1988).

In the 1990s, Ferzetti only appeared in minor or brief roles in TV movies, such as Voyage of Terror: The Achille Lauro Affair (1990), Black as the Heart (1991), Die Ringe des Saturn (1992), Natale con papà (1994) and mini-series such as Private Crimes (1995), in which he played Dr. Braschi. He did however appear in the film First Action Hero (1994), but his only major role of the 1990s was as the Duke of Venice in Othello (1995), directed by Oliver Parker. He also appeared in Renzo Martinelli's Porzûs and Alfredo Angeli's television series Con rabbia e con amore (both from 1997).

In the 2000s, Ferzetti appeared in Lost Love (Perduto amor, 2003), directed by Franco Battiato, in Concorso di colpa (2005), directed by Claudio Fragasso and in I Am Love (2009), directed by Luca Guadagnino. His best known role, after 1996, is as Nono in the French series Une famille formidable, in which he appeared in 11 episodes, between 1996 and 2007. He portrayed Enrico in Edoardo Leo's comedy picture, 18 Years Later (Diciotto anni dopo, 2010), which featured Marco Bonini in the lead role.

== Death ==
Ferzetti died on 2 December 2015, aged 90.

== Filmography ==
=== Film ===
- Street of the Five Moons (directed by Luigi Chiarini) (1942)
- Bengasi (directed by Augusto Genina) (1942) (uncredited)
- The Countess of Castiglione (directed by Flavio Calzavara) (1942)
- Felicità perduta (1946)
- Les Misérables (directed by Riccardo Freda) (1948) as Tholomyes, un cliente di Fantina (uncredited)
- Vertigine d'amore (directed by Luigi Capuano) (1949)
- Fabiola (directed by Alessandro Blasetti) (1949) as Claudius
- William Tell (directed by Giorgio Pàstina) (1949) as Corrado Hant
- Sicilian Uprising (directed by Giorgio Pàstina) (1949)
- Flying Squadron (directed by Luigi Capuano) (1949) as Ufficiale D'aviazione
- Benvenuto, reverendo! (directed by Aldo Fabrizi) (1950)
- Barrier to the North (directed by Luis Trenker) (1950) as Lieutenant Berti
- Red Seal (directed by Flavio Calzavara) (1950)
- Lo Zappatore (directed by Rate Furlan) (1950)
- The Forbidden Christ (also known as Strange Deception, directed by Curzio Malaparte) (Il Cristo proibito, 1951)
- The Ungrateful Heart (directed by Guido Brignone) (1951) as Giorgio Suprina
- The Counterfeiters (directed by Franco Rossi) (1951) as Dario
- The Lovers of Ravello (directed by Francesco De Robertis) (1951) as Sandro Deodata
- Deceit (directed by Guido Brignone) (1952) as Andrea Vannini
- Three Forbidden Stories (directed by Augusto Genina) (1952) as Comm. Borsani (First segment)
- The Wayward Wife (directed by Mario Soldati) (1953) as Il professore Franco Vagnuzzi
- Puccini (directed by Carmine Gallone) (1953) as Giacomo Puccini
- Empty Eyes (directed by Antonio Pietrangeli) (1953) as Fernando Maestrelli
- Vestire gli ignudi (directed by Marcello Pagliero) (1953) as Ludovico Nota
- Cento anni d'amore (directed by Lionello De Felice) (1954) as Carlo, the Political Prisoner (segment "Gli ultimi dieci Minuti")
- Modern Virgin (directed by Marcello Pagliero) (1954) as Gabriele Demico
- Camilla (directed by Luciano Emmer) (1954) as Dott. Mario Rossetti
- House of Ricordi (directed by Carmine Gallone) (1954) as Giacomo Puccini
- Sins of Casanova (directed by Steno) (1955) as Giacomo Casanova
- Adriana Lecouvreur (directed by Guido Salvini) (1955) as Maurizio di Sassonia
- Le Amiche (directed by Michelangelo Antonioni) (1955) as Lorenzo
- Un po' di cielo (directed by Giorgio Moser) (1955)
- Il prezzo della gloria (directed by Antonio Musu) (1956)
- Difendo il mio amore (directed by Giulio Macchi) (1956) as Pietro Leonardi
- Donatella (directed by Mario Monicelli) (1956) as Maurizio
- Souvenir d'Italie (directed by Antonio Pietrangeli) (1957) as Lawyer Alberto Cortini
- Parola di ladro (directed by Nanni Loy and Gianni Puccini) (1957)
- March's Child (directed by Antonio Pietrangeli) (1958) as Sandro
- Angel in a Taxi (directed by Antonio Leonviola) (1958) as Andrea
- Le insaziabili (Tant d'amour perdu, directed by Léo Joannon) (1958) as Frédéric Solingen
- Girls for the Summer (directed by Gianni Franciolini) (1958) as Giulio Ferrari
- Everyone's in Love (directed by Giuseppe Orlandini) (1959) as Arturo
- Le secret du Chevalier d'Éon (Storie d'amore proibite, directed by Jacqueline Audry) (1959) as Bernard Turquet de Mayenne
- Hannibal (directed by Carlo Ludovico Bragaglia) (1959) as Fabius Maximus
- L'Avventura (directed by Michelangelo Antonioni) (1960) as Sandro
- Long Night in 1943 (directed by Florestano Vancini) (1960) as Mario Villani
- Labbra rosse (directed by Giuseppe Bennati) (1960) as Avvocato Paolo Martini
- Il carro armato dell'8 settembre (directed by Gianni Puccini) (1960) as Tommaso
- Femmine di lusso (directed by Giorgio Bianchi) (1960) as Alberto Bressan
- Jessica (directed by Jean Negulesco) (1962) as Edmondo Raumo
- Rencontres (directed by Philippe Agostini) (1962) as Ralph Scaffari
- Congo vivo (directed by Giuseppe Bennati) (1962) as Roberto Santi
- La monaca di Monza (directed by Carmine Gallone) (1962) as Gian Paolo Osio
- Le Crime ne paie pas (directed by Gérard Oury) (1962) as Angelo Giraldi (segment "Le masque")
- Cross of the Living (La croix des vivants, directed by Ivan Govar) (1962) as L'abbé Delcourt / Abbe
- Imperial Venus (directed by Jean Delannoy) (1962) as Freron
- I Don Giovanni della Costa Azzurra (directed by Vittorio Sala) (1962) as Avvocato Leblanc
- The Shortest Day (directed by Sergio Corbucci) (1963) as Tenente in trincea
- Torpedo Bay (directed by Bruno Vailati and Charles Frend) (1963) as Leonardi
- A Sentimental Attempt (directed by Massimo Franciosa and Pasquale Festa Campanile) (1963) as Giulio
- Mort, où est ta victoire? (directed by Hervé Bromberger) (1964) as Max Gurgine
- The Warm Life (directed by Florestano Vancini) (1964) as Guido
- Desideri d'estate (directed by Silvio Amadio) (1964)
- Crucero de verano (directed by Luis Lucia) (1964) as Carlos Brul y Betancourt
- Crime on a Summer Morning (Par un beau matin d'été, directed by Jacques Deray) (1965) as Victor Dermott
- Three Rooms in Manhattan (Trois chambres à Manhattan, directed by Marcel Carné) (1965) as Comte Larsi
- Lo scippo (directed by Nando Cicero) (1965) as Gambetti
- The Bible: In the Beginning... (directed by John Huston) (1966) as Lot
- The Devil in Love (directed by Ettore Scola) (1966) as Lorenzo de' Medici
- We Still Kill the Old Way (A ciascuno il suo, directed by Elio Petri) (1967) as Avvocato Rosello
- Calda e... infedele (Un diablo bajo la almohada, directed by José María Forqué) (1968) as Anselmo
- Escalation (directed by Roberto Faenza) (1968) as Augusto Lambertinghi
- Come Play with Me (directed by Salvatore Samperi) (1968) as Stefano
- Better a Widow (directed by Duccio Tessari) (1968) as Don Calogero Minniti
- Love Problems (directed by Giuliano Biagetti) (1968) as Guido
- Bandits in Rome (directed by Alberto De Martino) (1968) as Commissioner
- Once Upon a Time in the West (directed by Sergio Leone) (1968) as Morton - Railroad Baron
- The Protagonists (directed by Marcello Fondato) (1968) as Il Commissario
- Machine Gun McCain (Gli intoccabili, directed by Giuliano Montaldo) (1969) as Don Francesco DeMarco
- That Splendid November (Un bellissimo novembre, directed by Mauro Bolognini) (1969) as Biagio
- On Her Majesty's Secret Service (directed by Peter Hunt) (1969) as Marc-Ange Draco
- L'amica (directed by Alberto Lattuada) (1969) as Paolo Marchesi
- The Confession (L'aveu, directed by Costa-Gavras) (1970) as Kohoutek
- Cannabis (directed by Pierre Koralnik) (1970) as Inspector Bardeche
- Cold Sweat (De la part des copains, directed by Terence Young) (1970) (uncredited)
- Million Dollar Eel (directed by Salvatore Samperi) (1971) as Vasco
- Ripped Off (Un uomo dalla pelle dura, directed by Franco Prosperi) (1972) as Tony La Monica
- Doppia coppia con Regina (Alta tension, directed by Julio Buchs) (1972) as Pablo Moncada
- Mendiants et orgueilleux (directed by Jacques Poitrenaud) (1972)
- Trois milliards sans ascenseur (directed by Roger Pigaut) (1972) as M. Raphaël
- Divorce His, Divorce Hers (directed by Waris Hussein) (1973) as Turi Livicci
- Hitler: The Last Ten Days (Gli ultimi 10 giorni di Hitler, directed by Ennio De Concini) (1973) as Fieldmarshall Wilhelm Keitel
- Hospitals: The White Mafia (directed by Luigi Zampa) (1973) as Prof. Daniele Vallotti
- The Night Porter (Il portiere di notte, directed by Liliana Cavani) (1974) as Hans
- Appassionata (directed by Gianluigi Calderone) (1974) as Dr. Emilio Rutelli
- Kidnap (directed by Giovanni Fago) (1974) as Frank Salvatore
- Processo per direttissima (directed by Lucio De Caro) (1974) as L'avvocato Finaldi
- La prova d'amore (directed by Tiziano Longo) (1974)
- Corruzione al palazzo di giustizia (directed by Marcello Aliprandi) (1975) as Prandó
- ...a tutte le auto della polizia (directed by Mario Caiano) (1975) as Professore Andrea Icardi
- End of the Game (Der Richter und sein Henker, directed by Maximilian Schell) (1975) as Dr. Lutz
- Jackpot (directed by Terence Young) (1975)
- La Orca (directed by Eriprando Visconti) (1976) as Valerio
- Lezioni di violoncello con toccata e fuga (directed by Davide Montemurri) (1976) as Father of Stella
- Le guêpier (directed by Roger Pigaut) (1976) as Gaspard
- Nick the Sting (directed by Fernando Di Leo) (1976) as Maurice
- A Matter of Time (directed by Vincente Minnelli) (1976) as Antonio Vicari
- Oedipus Orca (directed by Eriprando Visconti) (1977) as Valerio
- Sette note in nero (directed by Lucio Fulci) (1977) as Emilio Rospini
- L'uomo di Corleone (directed by Duilio Coletti) (1977)
- Mon premier amour (directed by Elie Chouraqui) (1978) as Georges
- CIA contro KGB (L'ordre et la sécurité du monde, directed by Claude d'Anna) (1978) as Herzog
- Porci con la P 38 (directed by Gianfranco Pagani) (1978) as Max Astarita
- Suggestionata (directed by Alfredo Rizzo) (1978) as Gregorio
- Incontro con gli umanoidi (Encuentro en el abismo, directed by Anthony Richmond and Tonino Ricci) (1979) as Miles
- Bloodline (directed by Terence Young) (1979) as Maresciallo Campagna (uncredited)
- Gli anni struggenti (directed by Vittorio Sindoni) (1979) as Prof. Bivona
- Inchon (directed by Terence Young) (1981) as Turkish Brigadier
- Grog (directed by Francesco Laudadio) (1982) as Alberto
- Vatican Conspiracy (directed by Marcello Aliprandi) (1982) as Cardinale Ixaguirre
- Quartetto Basileus (directed by Fabio Carpi) (1983) as Mario Cantone
- Julia and Julia (Giulia e Giulia, directed by Peter Del Monte) (1987) as Paolo's Father
- Computron 22 (directed by Giuliano Carnimeo) (1988) as Il nonno
- Una fredda mattina di maggio (directed by Vittorio Sindoni) (1990) as Signor Mantoni
- Caldo soffocante (directed by Giovanna Gagliardo) (1991) as Gaetano Castelli
- First Action Hero (directed by Nini Grassia) (1994) as Ben Costa
- Othello (directed by Oliver Parker) (1995) as The Duke of Venice
- Con rabbia e con amore (directed by Alfredo Angeli) (1997) as Leone
- Porzûs (directed by Renzo Martinelli) (1997) as Storno vecchio
- L'avvocato De Gregorio (directed by Pasquale Squitieri) (2003) as Alfonso
- Lost Love (directed by Franco Battiato) (2003) as Tommaso Pasini
- Concorso di colpa (directed by Claudio Fragasso) (2004) as Vito Santamaria
- I Am Love (directed by Luca Guadagnino) (2009) as Edoardo Recchi Senior
- Diciotto anni dopo (directed by Edoardo Leo) (2010) as Enrico (final film role)

=== Television ===
- I Spy (2 episodes, 1966) as Aldo
- Dossier Mata Hari (directed by Mario Landi) (1967) as Bouchardon
- Divorce His, Divorce Hers (directed by Waris Hussein) (1973) as Turi Livicci
- A torto e a ragione (directed by Edmo Fenoglio) (1978)
- I vecchi e i giovani (directed by Marco Leto) (1979) as Flaminio Salvo
- Quasi quasi mi sposo, directed by Vittorio Sindoni (1982) as The Engineer
- The Scarlet and the Black, uncredited, directed by Jerry London (1983) as Prince Mataeo (uncredited)
- Delitto e castigo (directed by Mario Missiroli) (1983)
- Le ambizioni sbagliate (directed by Fabio Carpi) (1983) as Prof. Malacrida
- Die goldenen Schuhe (directed by Dietrich Haugk) (1983) as Marquesade Buenaventa
- Quo Vadis? (directed by Franco Rossi) (1985) as Piso
- Follia amore mio (directed by Gianni Bongioanni) (1986)
- La voglia di vincere (directed by Vittorio Sindoni) (1987) as Professor Besson
- Gli angeli del potere (directed by Giorgio Albertazzi) (1988) as Dr. Donhal
- Due fratelli (directed by Alberto Lattuada) (1988) as Procuratore
- Around the World in 80 Days (directed by Buzz Kulik) (1989) as Italian Chief of Police
- Pronto soccorso (directed by Francesco Massaro) (1990)
- Voyage of Terror: The Achille Lauro Affair (directed by Alberto Negrin) (1990)
- Nero come il cuore (directed by Maurizio Ponzi) (1991) as Signor Noé Alga Croce
- Die Ringe des Saturn (directed by Michael Kehlmann) (1992)
- Private Crimes (directed by Sergio Martino) (1993) as Dottor Guido Braschi
- Natale con papà (directed by Giorgio Capitani) (1994)
- Il coraggio di Anna (directed by Giorgio Capitani) (1994) as Vittorio
- Alta società (directed by Giorgio Capitani) (1995)
- Un prete tra noi (directed by Giorgio Capitani and Lodovico Gasparini) (1997) as Ettore (1997)
- Il cielo sotto il deserto (directed by Alberto Negrin) (1998) as Father Jacob
- Le ragazze di Miss Italia (directed by Dino Risi) (2002)
- Callas e Onassis (directed by Giorgio Capitani) (2005) as Livanos
- Papa Luciani - Il sorriso di Dio (directed by Giorgio Capitani) (2006) as Cardinal Siri
- Une famille formidable (11 episodes, 1992–2007) as Nono
