= Alejandro Rey =

American actor and television director (1930–1987)

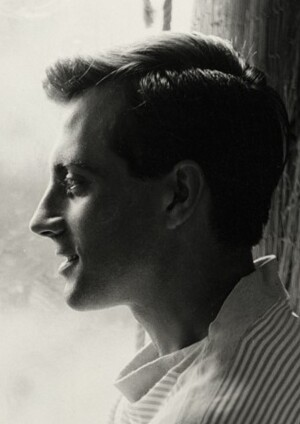
- Born: February 8, 1930; Buenos Aires, Argentina
- Died: May 21, 1987 (aged 57); Los Angeles, California, U.S.
- Occupations: Actor, director
- Years active: 1953–1986
- Spouses: Cristina Rudy (m. 1966; div. 1968) Joyce Bowman (m. 1969; div. 1980)
- Children: 1

Alejandro Rey (February 8, 1930 – May 21, 1987) was an Argentine-American actor and television director.

== Career ==
=== Early work ===
Rey was born in Buenos Aires and studied acting under Hedwig Schlichter and Milagros de la Vega. He became known as an actor in Argentine movies. In 1957, he participated in the film El Diablo de vacaciones, directed by Ferruccio Cerio, with Nelly Panizza and Ana María Cassan, embarking on the ship Yapeyu to travel around the world, but filming was never completed. In 1960, he began working with Ana Casares forming the main couple of the television program María Trastorno y yo, but within three months, production was interrupted after he was hired in the United States for a small role in Battle at Bloody Beach.

=== 1960 to 1986 ===
In 1961, Rey made a guest appearance on the courtroom series Perry Mason as murder victim and title character Vincent Danielli in "The Case of the Injured Innocent". He had supporting and leading roles in two episodes of Thriller titled "Guillotine" (1961) and "La Strega" (1962). One of Rey's most visible film roles came in Fun in Acapulco (1963).

Rey's best known role was that of casino owner and playboy Carlos Ramirez on the television series The Flying Nun (1967–70), which became an international success. He played a South American patriot in the Voyage to the Bottom of the Sea episode "The Mist of Silence". He portrayed a Spanish sergeant on a 1966 episode of Daniel Boone. He also appeared in a season one episode of The Fugitive titled "Smoke Screen". He appeared in an episode of Route 66, as a jai alai player in Florida and brother to one of Fidel Castro's junior officers, hoping to be reunited with his brother. Rey appeared in the That Girl episode entitled “The Mating Game”, season one episode 30.

Rey's only credited lead in a film in the United States was in The Stepmother (1972). He remained busy on television, playing the role of Karl Duval on Days of Our Lives from 1976 to 1977. He was also a frequent panelist on the game shows Tattletales; He Said, She Said; Hollywood Squares and Match Game. He appeared as part of an ensemble cast in William Peter Blatty's film The Ninth Configuration (1980). In 1986, he played Captain Luis Rueda on Dallas. He also directed for television, with credits on Villa Allegre, The Facts of Life and Forever Fernwood.

== Death ==
Rey died from lung cancer on May 21, 1987, at Cedars-Sinai Medical Center at age 57. He is buried at the Holy Cross Cemetery in Culver City, California.

== Filmography ==
=== Movies ===
Year	Title	Role	Notes
1953	Dock Sud		
1954	Guacho		
1956	Graciela	Friend	
1956	Enigma de mujer	Felipe	
1956	Cubitos de hielo		
1957	La Casa del angel	Julian	
1957	Alfonsina		
1957	El Diablo de vacaciones		Filming did not conclude
1959	Solomon and Sheba	Sittar	Uncredited
1960	Bajo el cielo andaluz	Antonio	
1961	La Maestra enamorada		
1961	Battle at Bloody Beach	Julio Fontana	
1963	Fun in Acapulco	Moreno	
1965	Synanon	Chris	
1966	Blindfold	Arthur Vincenti	
1971	The Sandpit Generals	Fray Jose Pedro	
1972	The Stepmother	Frank Delgado	
1974	Mr. Majestyk	Larry Mendoza	
1974	The Pacific Connection	The Governor	
1975	Breakout	Sanchez	
1976	High Velocity	Alejandro Martel	
1978	The Swarm	Dr. Tomas Martinez	
1979	Sunburn	Fons	
1979	Cuba	Faustino	
1980	The Ninth Configuration	Lieutenant Gomez	
1984	Moscow on the Hudson	Orlando Ramirez	
1986	TerrorVision	Spiro	

=== Television ===
Year	Title	Role	Notes
1961	Surfside 6	Tony Ricardo	Episode: Spinout at Sebring, S01 E32 (aired May 8, 1961).
1961	Perry Mason	Vincent Danielli	Episode: The Case of the Injured Innocent, S05 E10 (aired Nov. 18, 1961).
1961	Thriller	Robert Lamont	Episode: Guillotine, S02 E02 (aired Sept. 26, 1961).
1961	The Dick Powell Theatre	Ramon	Episode: John J. Diggs, S01 E04 (aired Oct. 17, 1961).
1962	Thriller	Tonio Bellini	Episode: La Strega, S02 E17 (aired Jan. 15, 1962).
1962	The Dick Powell Theatre	Isidro	Episode: Death in a Village, S01 E15 (aired Jan. 2, 1962).
1962	The Dick Powell Theatre	Perez	Episode: Price of Tomatoes, S01 E17 (aired Jan.16, 1962).
1962	The Dick Powell Theatre	Ysidro Astouga	Episode: The Doomsday Boys, S02 E04 (aired Oct. 16, 1962).
1962	The Wide Country	Manny	Episode: Who Killed Edde Gannon?, S01 E04 (aired Oct. 11, 1962).
1962	The Lloyd Bridges Show	Ion	Episode: Wheresoever I Enter, S01 E01 (aired Sept. 11. 1962).
1962	Outlaws	Frank Vincente	Episode: A Day to Kill, S02 E19
1962	The Real McCoys	Mario	Episode: Made in Italy, S05 E28 (aired Feb. 22, 1962).
1963	The Fugitive	Paco Alvarez	Episode: Smoke Screen, S01 E07
1963	Route 66	Quiepo Varella	Episode: Peace, Pity, Pardon, S03 E26
1963	Death Valley Days	Tiburcio Vasquez	Episode: The Debt, S11 E22
1963	Naked City	Jaime deJesus	Episode: Bringing Far Places Together, S04 E22
1963	The Many Loves of Dobie Gillis	Alfredo Farino	Episode: Who Did William Tell?, S04 E14
1964	Kraft Suspense Theatre	Juano Herrera	Episode: That He Should Weep for Her, S02 E04 (aired Nov. 6, 1964)
1964	The Alfred Hitchcock Hour	Juan Diaz	Episode: The Life Work of Juan Diaz, S03 E04 (aired Oct. 26, 1964).
1964	Voyage to the Bottom of the Sea	Ricardo	Episode: The Mist of Silence, S01 E04 (aired Oct. 5, 1964).
1964	Slattery's People	Mike Valera	10 episodes
1964	Arrest and Trial	Rudy Sanchez	Episode: The Best There Is, S01 E21 (aired Feb. 16, 1964).
1964	The Trials of O'Brien	Francisco Perez	Episode: The Only Game in Town, S01 E22 (aired Mar. 18, 1966).
1965	The Greatest Show on Earth	Chico	1 Episode, Where the Wire Ends
1965	The F.B.I.	Joe Cloud	1 Episode, A Mouthful of Dust S01 E03 (aired Oct. 3, 1965)
1966	The Monroes	Komatah	1 Episode, Pawnee Warrior
1966	Run for Your Life	Mario Cudero	1 Episode, Edge of the Volcano
1966	The Girl from U.N.C.L.E.	Paco Herrera	1 Episode, The Horns-of-the-Dilemma Affair
1966	Daniel Boone	The Sergeant	1 Episode, Cibola
1966	I Spy	Ferenc	1 Episode, My Mother, the Spy
1966	The Trials of O'Brien	Francisco Perez	1 Episode, The Only Game in Town
1967	Three for Danger	Alan	TV movie
1967	The Iron Horse	Francisco Gomez	1 Episode, The Passenger
1967	My Three Sons	Manuello	1 Episode, My Son, the Bullfighter, S07 E21
1967	That Girl	Eduardo Guzmán	1 Episode, The Mating Game
1967	The F.B.I.	Carlos Avila	1 Episode, The Gray Passenger
1967–1970	The Flying Nun	Carlos Ramirez	82 episodes
1968	Cowboy in Africa	Ruy	2 part episode: 'African Rodeo' S1 E16 and S1 E17
1969	Seven in Darkness	Ramon Rohas	ABC Movie of the Week
1969	The Outcasts	Miguel Otero	1 Episode, And Then There Was One
1969	The F.B.I.	Miguel Torres	1 Episode, The Catalyst
1969	The Mike Douglas Show	Self	1 Episode, Co-Host, S08 E168, aired April 30, 1969.
1969	It Takes a Thief	Mendoza	1 Episode, Guess Who's Coming to Rio
1970	That Girl	Felix	1 Episode, That Señorita
1970	The Virginia Graham Show	Self	S01, E01 (aired June 8, 1970)
1970	The High Chaparral	Diego de la Paula	1 Episode, An Anger Greater Than Mine
1971	Gunsmoke	Father Sanchez	3 Episodes (S17 E12-14 - The Bullet (Part 1, 2 and 3)
1971	Owen Marshall, Counselor at Law	Jose Borotra	1 Episode, Eighteen Years Next April
1971	The Good Life	Rico	1 Episode, Jane's Double Life
1972	Alias Smith and Jones	Ramon Cordoba	1 Episode, The Clementine Ingredient
1972	Cannon	Father Joseph	1 Episode, Treasure of San Ignacio
1973	Money to Burn	Caesar Rodriguez	ABC Movie of the Week
1973	Night Gallery	Raphael	1 Episode, The Doll of Death
1974	Siempre habrá un mañana		1 Episode, #1.1
1974	Police Story	Metrano	1 Episode, Across the Line
1975	Kung Fu	Matteo	1 Episode, A Lamb to the Slaughter
1975	Satan's Triangle	Father Peter Martin	ABC Movie of the Week
1976	McMillan & Wife	Miguel Esteban	1 Episode, Greed
1976	The Bionic Woman	Carlos Scappini	1 Episode, Winning Is Everything
1976–1977	Days of Our Lives	Karl Duval	
1978	The Amazing Spider-Man	President Calderon	1 Episode, Escort to Danger
1978	Flying High	Cortez	1 Episode, The Marcy Connection
1980	Stunts Unlimited	Fernando Castilla	TV movie
1981	Flamingo Road	Lorca	2 Episodes
1981	The Love Boat	Carlos Jose Ramon Raul Sebastian Battista Ramirez	1 Episode, The Duel/Two for Julie/Aunt Hilly
1982	The Fall Guy	Pepe Garcia	1 Episode, The Adventures of Ozzie and Harold
1982	Cassie & Co.	Victor Ramos	1 Episode, The Golden Silence
1982	Herbie, the Love Bug	Sergio	1 Episode, My House Is Your House
1982	Bring 'Em Back Alive	Count Markoff	1 Episode, There's One Born Every Minute
1982	The Devlin Connection	Rene Patric	1 Episode, Arsenic and Old Caviar
1982	Knight Rider	Rudy del Fuego	1 Episode, Forget Me Not
1983	The Fall Guy	Eduard Firenze	1 Episode, Manhunter
1983	Rita Hayworth: The Love Goddess	Eduardo Cansino	TV movie
1983	Hotel	King Fernando	1 Episode, Hotel (pilot episode)
1983	Grace Kelly	Oleg Cassini	TV movie
1983	We Got It Made	Victor	2 Episodes
1984	Fantasy Island	Don Juan	1 Episode, Don Juan's Last Affair/Final Adieu
1984	Masquerade	Castillo	1 Episode, Spanish Gambit
1984	Santa Barbara	Dr. Ramirez	3 Episodes
1984	E/R	Paolo Fuentes	1 Episode, Sentimental Journey
1985	Cover Up	Carlos Medina	1 Episode, Healthy, Wealthy and Dead
1985	Wildside	Ambassador Pintador	1 Episode, Buffalo Who?
1986	Dallas	Captain Luis Rueda	7 Episodes
1986	The A-Team	Commandent	1 Episode, The Theory of Revolution, (final appearance)
