= Poitrenaud =

Poitrenaud is a French surname. Notable people with the surname include:

- Clément Poitrenaud (born 1982), French rugby union player
- Jacques Poitrenaud (1922–2005), French film director and actor
