= Mustapha Ourrad =

French Algerian copy editor killed during the 2015 Charlie Hebdo shooting

Mustapha Ourrad (Kabyle: Mestafa Urad, June 21, 1954 – January 7, 2015) was a French Algerian copy editor, killed during the 2015 Charlie Hebdo shooting.

== Biography ==
Mustapha Ourrad was born in 1954 in Aït Larbâa, Algeria. Orphaned after his mother died when he was 2 and his father when he was 7, Ourrad was taken in and raised by two of his uncles. After completing secondary school, he began studying medicine in Algiers before abandoning it. He was much more interested in culture—be it art, literature, or philosophy. (Nietzsche was one of his favorite philosophers.) One of his favorite books was Albert Cossery's Mendiants et orgueilleux, and his childhood friend Ousmer later said Ourrad also loved André Gide, André Malraux, and Charles Baudelaire, which earned him the nickname "Mustapha Baudelaire."

He left Algeria at age 20 and arrived in France in 1974, with his friends paying for his passage. He became a French citizen in December 2014.

Ourrad joined the publisher Hachette, where he worked as a copy editor, notably on the Axis encyclopedia. He then worked for various publications, including Viva and Charlie Hebdo. It was at the latter newspaper's headquarters that he was killed on January 7, 2015, one of the victims of the Charlie Hebdo shooting.

He was posthumously named a Chevalier of the French Legion of Honour on December 31, 2015. On January 13, 2016, the first day of the Amazigh year, members of the Kabyle diaspora paid homage to him in Paris. His remains lie at Paris' Père Lachaise Cemetery.
