= Vittorio Sanipoli =

Italian actor (1915–1992)

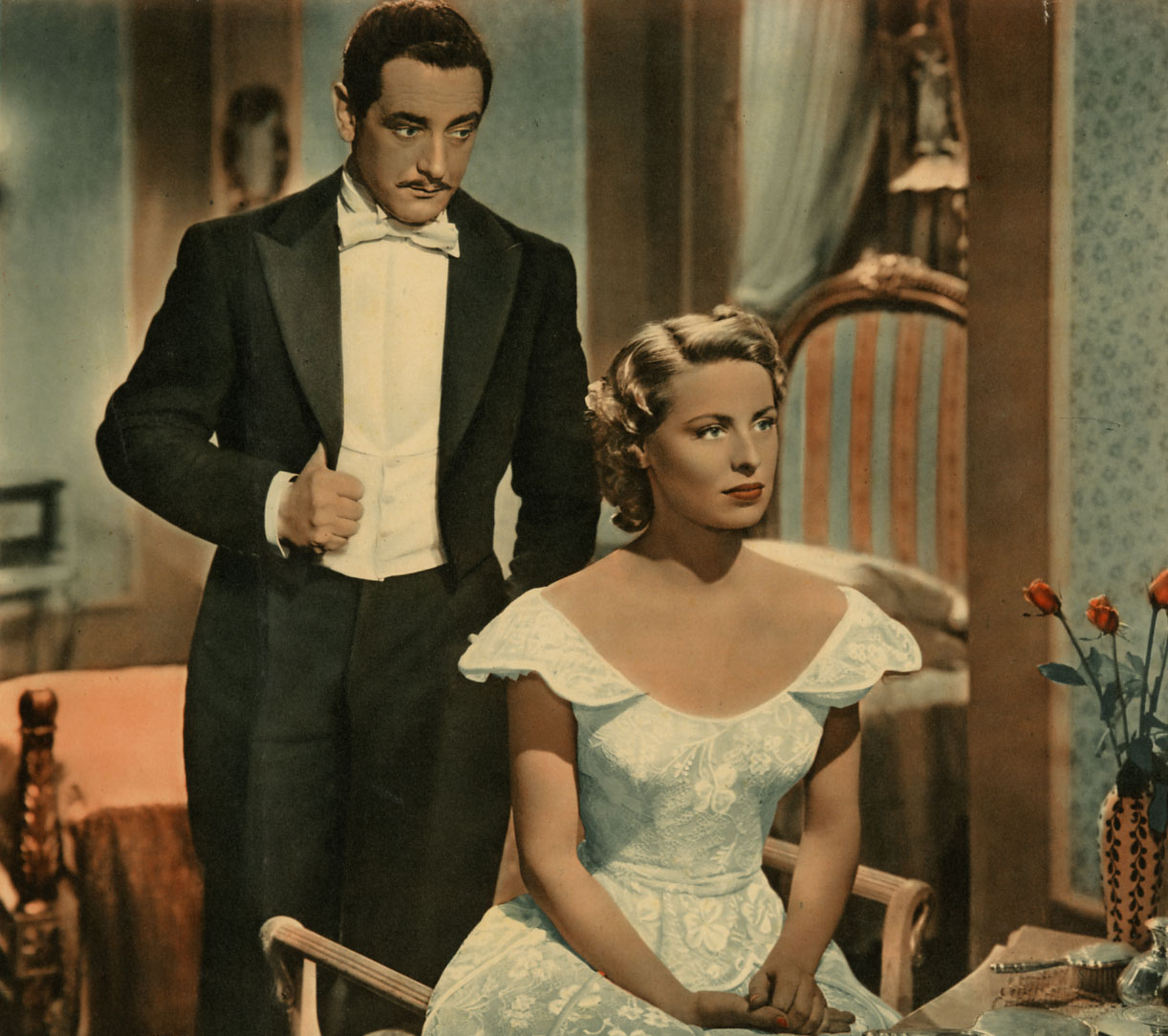
- Sanipoli with Lia Amanda in Past Lovers (1953)
- Born: Luciano Sanipoli; 27 October 1915; Genoa, Liguria; Italy
- Died: 25 July 1992 (aged 76); Rome, Lazio; Italy
- Other name: Vittorio Sanni
- Occupation: Actor
- Years active: 1942–1980 (film)
- Spouse: Amalia D'Alessio

Vittorio Sanipoli (27 October 1915 – 25 July 1992) was an Italian stage, film and television actor. He appeared in around a hundred films and television series between 1942 and 1980.

== Life and career ==
Born Luciano Sanipoli in Genoa, he made his acting debut in 1939 in the Roman Calò's stage company Society of Mystery Shows. Quite soon he was cast in leading roles in dramas, achieving popularity and critical appreciation after World War II for his performances in Detective Story and Anne of the Thousand Days (both represented in 1951) and winning a San Genesio Award in 1957, for his performance in Virginio Puecher's Il Revisore.

Sanipoli made his film debut in 1942, starring in two adventure films based on Emilio Salgari's novels, Il figlio del Corsaro Rosso and Gli ultimi filibustieri, under the stage name Vittorio Sanni. After war, he continued his film career with dozens of roles, even if mainly consisting of supporting or character roles. While most of his performances were in Italy, he also worked on a number of co-productions with France such as La Reine Margot (1954).

Sanipoli also had an intense career in television, being a quite regular presence in high-profile RAI series and TV movies. He also worked on radio and as a voice actor.

Sanipoli was married to stage actress Amalia D'Alessio.

== Selected filmography ==
- La morte civile (1942) - Giulio, fratello di Rosalia
- The Son of the Red Corsair (1943) - Enrico di Ventimiglia
- Gli ultimi filibustieri (1943) - Enrico di Ventimiglia
- In High Places (1945) - Roberto
- O sole mio (1946)
- The Courier of the King (1947) - Luz
- La revanche de Baccarat (1947) - Arnaud, comte de Chamery
- Rocambole (1947) - Arnaud, comte de Chamery
- The White Devil (1947) - John
- Cuore (1948)
- Letter at Dawn (1948) - Enrico Veri
- Biancaneve e i sette ladri (1949)
- Torment (1950) - Rossi, un socio di Carlo
- Cavalcade of Heroes (1950) - Ottavio Monis
- Turri il bandito (1950)
- The Transporter (1950) - Johnny
- Song of Spring (1951) - Max
- Fugitive in Trieste (1951)
- Last Meeting (1951) - Augusto, il ricattatore
- Revenge of Black Eagle (1951) - Principe Boris Yuravleff
- The Reluctant Magician (1951)
- Vedi Napoli e poi muori (1951) - Roberto Sanesi
- The Woman Who Invented Love (1952) - Caddulo
- Milady and the Musketeers (1952)
- Son of the Hunchback (1952) - Conte Zeno
- Ragazze da marito (1952) - Commendator Spadoni (voice, uncredited)
- Il romanzo della mia vita (1952) - Gianni Maggini
- La trappola di fuoco (1952) - Ernesto
- Amore rosso (Marianna Sirca) (1952) - Sebastiano (voice, uncredited)
- Good Folk's Sunday (1953) - Avvocato Conti
- Sins of Rome (1953) - Marcus Virilius Rufus
- Gioventù alla sbarra (1953)
- Una donna prega (1953) - Gérard
- Too Young for Love (1953) - Sergio
- Neapolitans in Milan (1953) - Giovanni, capo operaio
- The Pagans (1953) - Tancredi Serra
- Past Lovers (1953) - Carlo
- Touchez pas au grisbi (1954) - Ramon
- Touchez pas au grisbi (1954) - Ramon
- Le Chevalier de Maison-Rouge (1954) - Maximilian Loris, Chevalier de Maison Rouge
- Modern Virgin (1954) - Vittorio
- Queen Margot (1954) - Maurevel, le chef de la police
- Napoli piange e ride (1954) - Maestro Michele Blasi
- Roland the Mighty (1956) - Gano di Maganza
- The Doll That Took the Town (1957) - Il commissario
- Addio per sempre! (1958)
- The Great War (1959) - Maggiore Venturi
- Constantine and the Cross (1961) - Apuleius
- Sword of the Conqueror (1961) - Wolfango
- The Mongols (1961) - (uncredited)
- Morte di un bandito (1961) - Carmelo
- Colossus of the Arena (1962) - Slave Chief
- Violenza segreta (1963) - Farnenti - un proprietario di bananeti
- Slave Girls of Sheba (1963) - Sheik Selim
- Maigret Sees Red (1963) - Pozzo
- The Organizer (1963) - Baudet
- Son of the Circus (1963) - Gillo Antares
- Il vendicatore mascherato (1964)
- Agent 077: From the Orient with Fury (1965) - Vardar
- Vacanze sulla neve (1966)
- Estouffade à la Caraïbe (1967) - Kosta
- Roma Bene (1971) - Il Questore
- Ten Days' Wonder (1971) - Commissaire
- We Are All in Temporary Liberty (1971) - Questor
- The Hassled Hooker (1972) - Attorney General
- Pianeta Venere (1972)
- Les hommes (1973) - Grisoni
- Cry of a Prostitute (1974) - Don Cascemi
- Three Tough Guys (1974) - Mike Petralia
- Le guêpier (1976) - Fossetti
