= Mario Montuori =

Italian cinematographer and painter (1920–1997)

- Born: 1 May 1920; Rome, Italy
- Died: 12 August 1997 (aged 77)
- Occupation: Cinematographer

Mario Montuori (1 May 1920 – 12 August 1997) was an Italian film cinematographer and painter.

== Life and career ==
Born in Rome, Mario Montuori was the son of the cinematographer Carlo. He began his film career in 1937, working as an assistant operator alongside his father. He was conscripted in 1940 and until 1943 was operator for Istituto Luce on the Russian front. In 1949 he debuted as a cinematographer, and his collaborations included films by Roberto Rossellini, Vittorio De Sica, Alberto Lattuada and Mario Soldati. Starting from the late 1970s, he left the cinema industry to dedicate himself to painting.

== Selected filmography ==
- To Live in Peace (1947)
- Women and Brigands (1950)
- Pact with the Devil (1950)
- Beauties on Bicycles (1951)
- O.K. Nerone (1951)
- It's Love That's Ruining Me (1951)
- Shadows on the Grand Canal (1951)
- We Two Alone (1952)
- The Dream of Zorro (1952)
- The Adventures of Mandrin (1952)
- The Overcoat (1952)
- The Queen of Sheba (1952)
- Noi peccatori (1953)
- Storms (1953)
- Too Young for Love (1953)
- Ivan, Son of the White Devil (1953)
- Modern Virgin (1954)
- Tripoli, Beautiful Land of Love (1954)
- Symphony of Love (1954)
- Roman Tales (1955)
- Chéri-Bibi (1955)
- The Bigamist (1956)
- The Most Beautiful Days (1956)
- Count Max (1957)
- The Wide Blue Road (1957)
- Ciao, ciao bambina! (1959)
- Ferdinando I, re di Napoli (1959)
- Prisoner of the Volga (1959)
- Noi siamo due evasi (1959)
- Il padrone delle ferriere (1959)
- Goliath and the Dragon (1960)
- A Breath of Scandal (1960)
- Love in Rome (1960)
- Behind Closed Doors (1961)
- The Italian Brigands (1962)
- The Lovely Lola (1962)
- Queen of The Chantecler (1962)
- Sodom and Gomorrah (1962)
- Three Nights of Love (1964)
- The Man, the Woman and the Money (1965)
- I complessi (1965)
- Highest Pressure (1965)
- Fury of Johnny Kid (1967)
- The Seven Cervi Brothers (1968)
- The Forgotten Pistolero (1969)
- How, When and with Whom (1969)
- Chuck Moll (1970)
- Una prostituta al servizio del pubblico e in regola con le leggi dello stato (1970)
- Doppia coppia con Regina (1972)
- Year One (1974)
- Charleston (1977)
