= Ripped Off =

- DVD cover for 'Ripped Off'
- Directed by: Franco Prosperi
- Written by: Lucio Battistrada; Adriano Bolzoni; Armando Crispino; Don Carlos Dunaway
- Produced by: Ottavio Oppo
- Starring: Robert Blake; Ernest Borgnine
- Cinematography: Gábor Pogány
- Edited by: Alberto Gallitti; Fima Noveck
- Music by: Carlos Pes
- Distributed by: Troma Entertainment
- Release date: 1972
- Running time: 83 minutes
- Countries: United States; Italy
- Language: English

Ripped Off (also known as The Boxer and Un uomo dalla pelle dura) is a 1972 American/Italian crime film directed by Franco Prosperi and starring Robert Blake and Ernest Borgnine.

== Plot ==
A young boxer is framed for murdering his crooked manager. His only option is to escape from jail and find the real murderer himself.

== Cast ==
- Robert Blake: Teddy "Cherokee" Wilcox
- Catherine Spaak: Claire Wilson
- Ernest Borgnine: Captain Perkins
- Tomas Milian: The Stranger
- Gabriele Ferzetti: Nick da Catarina
- Orazio Orlando: Mike Durell
