= Congo vivo =

1962 film

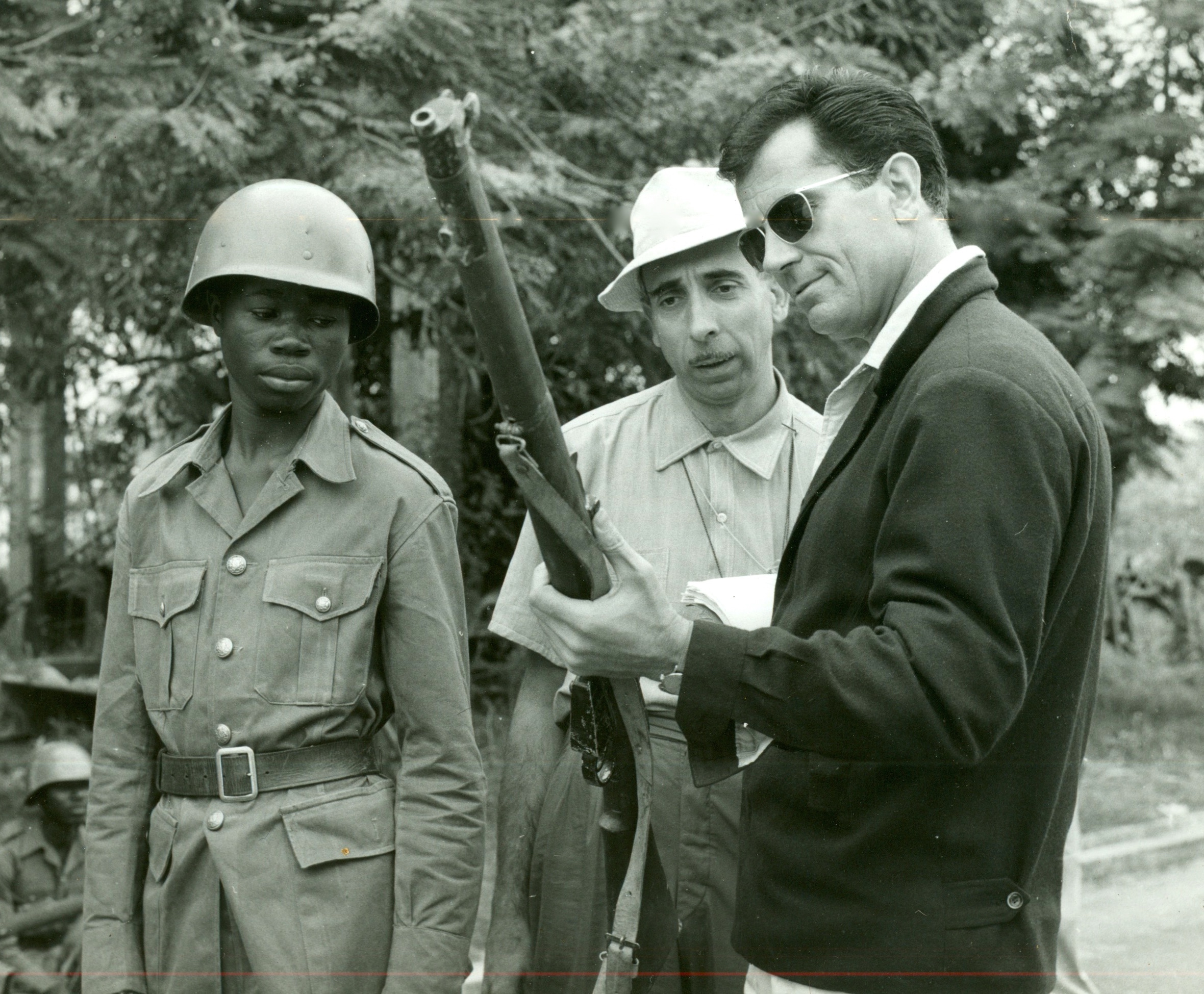
- Giuseppe Aquari and Gabriele Ferzetti on the set of Congo vivo
- Directed by: Giuseppe Bennati
- Starring: Gabriele Ferzetti; Jean Seberg
- Cinematography: Giuseppe Aquari
- Music by: Piero Piccioni
- Release date: 1962
- Country: Italy
- Language: Italian

Congo vivo is a 1962 Italian film. It stars actor Gabriele Ferzetti and Jean Seberg.
