= Lisa Gastoni =

Italian actress

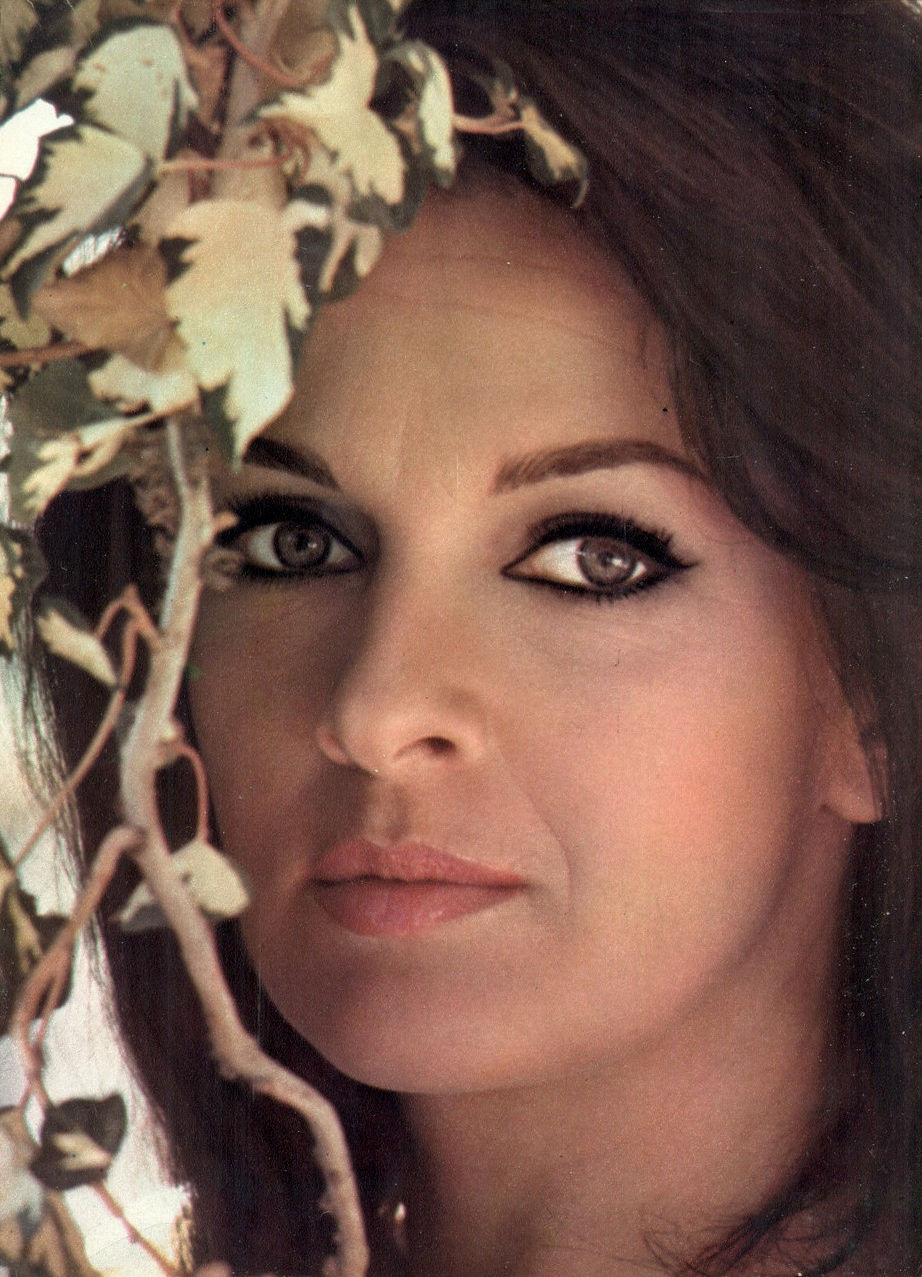
- Gastoni in the movie Come Play with Me (1968)
- Born: 28 July 1935 (age 90); Alassio, Savona, Liguria, Kingdom of Italy
- Occupation: Actress
- Years active: 1954–1979, 2005–present

Lisa Gastoni (born 28 July 1935) is an Italian film actress. Gastoni was named "Best Italian Actress of the Year, 1966" as she received both the Nastro D'Argento Award and the Golden Globe Award from Italy's Foreign Press Association.

== Biography ==
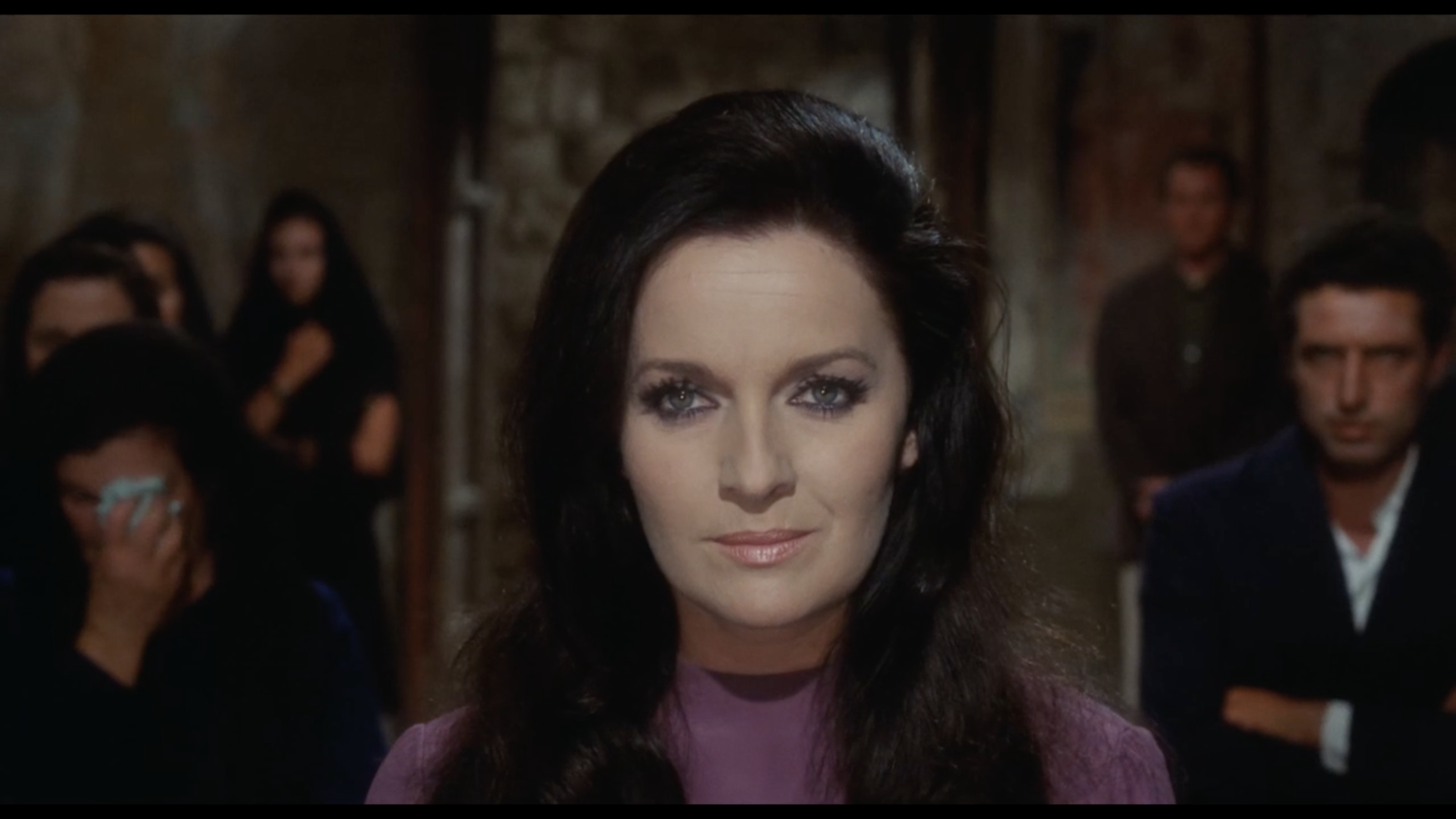
Gastoni in a scene from Maddalena (1971)

Daughter of an Italian father and an Irish mother, Gastoni and her family moved to England in 1948. She turned from her initial ambition of being an architect to modelling and acting.

She appeared in various B movies throughout the 1950s, as well as co-starring as Giulia in the Sapphire Films TV series The Four Just Men (1959) for ITV and at least two episodes of Danger Man in 1960 and 1961.

Gastoni returned to Italy in the 1960s, first appearing in sword-and-sandal and swashbuckler films, but eventually gaining the attention of respected directors. The turning point in her film career was her role in Grazie, zia by Salvatore Samperi. This would set the tone for the roles she would play for the next decade; bourgeois women who were seductive yet sexually frustrated, cruel and arrogant yet sad and sympathetic, manipulating the people around them to try to fill the emptiness in their own lives.

In 1979, she retired from acting to focus on painting and writing. In 2005 she returned to the screen with an appearance in the film Sacred Heart.

Lisa Gastoni is Roman Catholic.

== Selected filmography ==
- They Who Dare (1954)
- Doctor in the House (1954)
- Twist of Fate (1954) - Yvette (U.S. ' Beautiful Stranger ')
- Josephine and Men (1955)
- Man of the Moment (1955)
- The Baby and the Battleship (1956)
- Three Men in a Boat (1956)
- Second Fiddle (1957)
- Blue Murder at St Trinian's (1957)
- Man from Tangier (1957)
- Face in the Night (1957)
- Intent to Kill (1958)
- Rx Murder (1958)
- Chain of Events (1958) - Simone Day
- Wrong Number (1959)
- Passport to China (1961)
- Queen of the Seas (1961)
- The Breaking Point (1961)
- Eva (1962)
- Tharus Son of Attila (1962)
- Gidget Goes to Rome (1963)
- The Four Musketeers (1963)
- I maniaci (1964)
- 3 Avengers (1964)
- Three Swords for Rome (1964)
- Gentlemen of the Night (1964)
- Messalina vs. the Son of Hercules (1964)
- Wild, Wild Planet (1965)
- War of the Planets (1966)
- Wake Up and Die (1966)
- Come Play with Me (1968)
- The Seven Cervi Brothers (1968)
- L'amica (1969)
- Invasion (1970)
- Maddalena (1971)
- Seduction (1973)
- Bitter Love (1974)
- Last Days of Mussolini (1975)
- Lips of Lurid Blue (1975)
- Submission (1976)
- Sacred Heart (2005)
- Voice from the Stone (2017)
