= Grog (film) =

- Directed by: Francesco Laudadio
- Written by: Francesco Laudadio; Silvia Napolitano
- Starring: Franco Nero; Gabriele Ferzetti; Omero Antonutti; Cristina S. Pascual; Eros Pagni; Sandra Milo
- Cinematography: Giuseppe Maccari
- Edited by: Gino Bartolini
- Music by: Paolo Conte; Jimmy Fontana; Lilli Greco
- Release date: 1982
- Country: Italy
- Language: Italian

Grog is a 1982 Italian comedy-drama film. For this film the director Francesco Laudadio was awarded with a David di Donatello for Best New Director.

== Cast ==
- Franco Nero as Nicola Fanelli
- Omero Antonutti as Lawyer Enrico Manzi
- Sandra Milo as Vittoria De Rossi
- Gabriele Ferzetti as Professor Alberto De Rossi
- Christian De Sica as TV Stella presenter
- Claudio Cassinelli as Police Commissioner Mazzanti
- Eros Pagni as Sandro Galli
- Franco Javarone as Pasquale Dicillo
- Cristina S. Pascual as Lola
- Lunetta Savino as Elena De Rossi
- Donatella Damiani as Patrizia
- Renato Scarpa
- Marina Confalone
- Fiorenzo Fiorentini as Injured Man
- Michele Mirabella as Gino Baldello

== Reception ==
Italian critic Tullio Kezich described the film as an Italian version of William Wyler's The Desperate Hours "with performers well-suited to their roles [...] and some genuinely enjoyable moments", criticizing how "the moralizing tone ends up overshadowing the humor".

== See also ==
- List of Italian films of 1982
