= Le guêpier =

- Directed by: Roger Pigaut
- Written by: André-Georges Brunelin; Roger Pigaut
- Produced by: Eugène Lepicier
- Starring: Claude Brasseur; Marthe Keller; Gabriele Ferzetti; Vicky Messica; Vittorio Sanipoli; John Steiner
- Cinematography: Daniel Vogel
- Edited by: Christian Gaudin
- Music by: Giancarlo Chiaramello
- Distributed by: Warner-Columbia Film
- Release date: 1976
- Running time: 95 minutes
- Countries: France; Italy
- Language: French

Le guêpier is a 1976 French-Italian film, directed by Roger Pigaut. It stars actor Gabriele Ferzetti.

== Cast ==
- Claude Brasseur - Renaud
- Marthe Keller - Melba
- Gabriele Ferzetti - Gaspard
- Vicky Messica - Vava
- Vittorio Sanipoli - Fossetti
- John Steiner - Fisher
- Joëlle Bernard - Sarah
- Fernand Guiot - Navarre
- Jacques Richard - Miro
- Hélène Manesse - Irène
- Popeck - Hans (as Jean Herbert)
- Henri Czarniak - Director
