= A Devil Under the Pillow =

1968 film directed by José María Forqué

- Spanish: Un diablo bajo la almohada
- Italian: Calda e... infedele
- Directed by: José María Forqué
- Starring: Ingrid Thulin; Maurice Ronet; Gabriele Ferzetti
- Release date: 1968
- Countries: Italy; France; Spain
- Language: Italian

A Devil Under the Pillow (Spanish: Un diablo bajo la almohada, Italian: Calda e... infedele) is a 1968 Spanish-Italian film. It stars Ingrid Thulin, Maurice Ronet and Gabriele Ferzetti.

The film is a contemporary adaptation of the novel El curioso impertinente written by Miguel de Cervantes.

The original soundtrack of the movie was released by the record label MGM Records under the reference MGM 665503.

== Synopsis ==
Anselmo, a young anthropologist, is plagued by jealousy, even though his wife Camila gives him no reason to doubt her faithfulness. Despite being advised by a psychiatrist that the issue lies within himself, Anselmo remains unconvinced. He hatches a plan to test his wife's fidelity by asking his friend Lotario to seduce her. What Anselmo doesn't know is that Lotario is a professional flirt who ends up successfully seducing Camila.

== Cast ==
- Ingrid Thulin as Camila.
- Maurice Ronet as Lotario.
- Gabriele Ferzetti as Anselmo.
- Amparo Soler Leal as Leonela.
- Alfredo Landa as Brocheros.
- José Luis Coll as Dr. Fernández
- Antonio Pica as Mr. Anderson
- Víctor Israel as English delegate.
- Rogelio Madrid
- Vicente Bañó
- Enrique Echevarría
- Joaquín Roa as Mirón.
- Anne Doat as Laura.
- José Orjas as Cochero.
- Piero Lulli as Rafael.
- Gianni Solaro as Don Ernesto.
- Milo Quesada as Miguel.
- Laura Nucci as Mother of Camila.
