= Michele Mirabella =

Italian actor

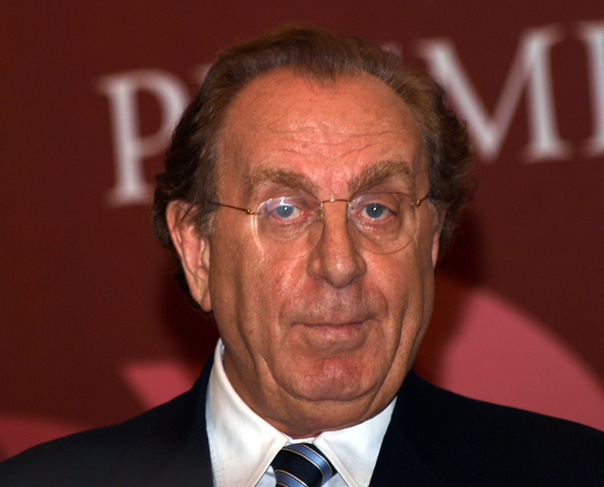
- Mirabella in 2011
- Born: 7 July 1943 (age 83); Bitonto, Italy
- Education: University of Bari (Graduation, Honorary Degree); University of Ferrara (Honorary Degree)
- Occupations: Television presenter, University professor
- Children: 2

Michele Mirabella Commendatore OMRI (born 7 July 1943) is an Italian television presenter, University professor and actor.

== Biography ==
Mirabella graduated in Letters at the University of Bari with a thesis on Luigi Pirandello and received an Honorary Degree in Pharmacy at the University of Ferrara and another in Medicine at the University of Bari. He's also Commendatore Ordine al Merito della Repubblica Italiana.

=== Show business ===
During the University years in Bari, Mirabella began his career as an actor and director of theatrical performances of works by Bertolt Brecht, William Shakespeare, Angelo Beolco, Carlo Goldoni, Samuel Beckett and Georg Buchner. Once he moved to Rome he joined RAI and worked on radio, creating and hosting radio broadcasts. In the early 1980s, Mirabella appeared in several movies, including Massimo Troisi's I'm Starting from Three and Lucio Fulci's The Beyond, where he played the role of librarian Martin Avery.

In 1996 he created the successful TV show Elisir, in transmission on Rai 3 from 1996 to 2017: Elisir was an information television programme dedicated to health and well-being based on clarity and informative simplicity.

Mirabella also curated several cultural programs on Rai Cultura.

=== Teaching ===
Mirabella taught "Sociology of communication: theory and techniques" in the Faculty of Cultural Heritage of the University of Lecce, "Sociology of communication: theory and techniques of mass media" at the University of Bari and has taught at the IULM University of Milan. He has also been the artistic director of the Teatro Traetta in Bitonto and the Teatro Nuovo in Udine.

== Personal life ==
Mirabella has been married once, but now he's separated from his wife; he has two daughters, Margherita and Marta; he considers himself Roman Catholic.

== Partial filmography ==
- Baba Yaga (1973)
- Salvo D'Acquisto (1974)
- House of Pleasure for Women (1976)
- I Hate Blondes (1980)
- I'm Starting from Three (1981)
- The Beyond (1981)
- Grog (1982)
- Acqua e sapone (1983)
- Thunder Warrior (1983)
- Fantozzi subisce ancora (1983)
- Vediamoci chiaro (1984)
- Demons 2 (1986)
- Troppo forte (1986)
- Topo Galileo (1988)
