= Topo Galileo =

1988 film by Francesco Laudadio

- Directed by: Francesco Laudadio
- Written by: Stefano Benni
- Produced by: Gianfranco Piccioli
- Starring: Beppe Grillo; Jerry Hall
- Cinematography: Gianlorenzo Battaglia
- Edited by: Ugo De Rossi
- Music by: Fabrizio De André; Mauro Pagani
- Release date: 26 February 1988
- Language: Italian

Topo Galileo (Galileo Mouse) is a 1988 Italian comedy film directed by Francesco Laudadio. The film was a box office bomb.

== Cast ==
- Beppe Grillo as Giuseppe Galileo
- Jerry Hall as Dr. 18
- Paolo Bonacelli as Professor Zitti
- Eros Pagni as NPP Director
- Athina Cenci as Minister of Defence
- Dagmar Lassander as Countess Faggiano
- Mino Bellei as General 13
- Michele Mirabella as TV Presenter
- Claudio Bisio as Dr. 18's Assistant
- Renato Cecchetto as Mr. 100
