= Souvenirs d'Italie =

Souvenir d'Italie
- Directed by: Antonio Pietrangeli
- Written by: Fabio Carpi; Nelo Risi; Agenore Incrocci; Furio Scarpelli; Dario Fo; Antonio Pietrangeli; Henry Cass (english dialogue)
- Produced by: Luigi Carpentieri; Ermanno Donati
- Starring: June Laverick; Isabelle Corey; Ingeborg Schöner
- Cinematography: Carlo Carlini; Aldo Tonti
- Edited by: Eraldo Da Roma
- Music by: Lelio Luttazzi
- Production company: Athena Cinematografica
- Distributed by: Rank Film Distributors of Italy (Italy); Promark Entertainment Group (International)
- Release date: April 9, 1957 (France)
- Running time: 100 minutes
- Country: Italy
- Language: Italian

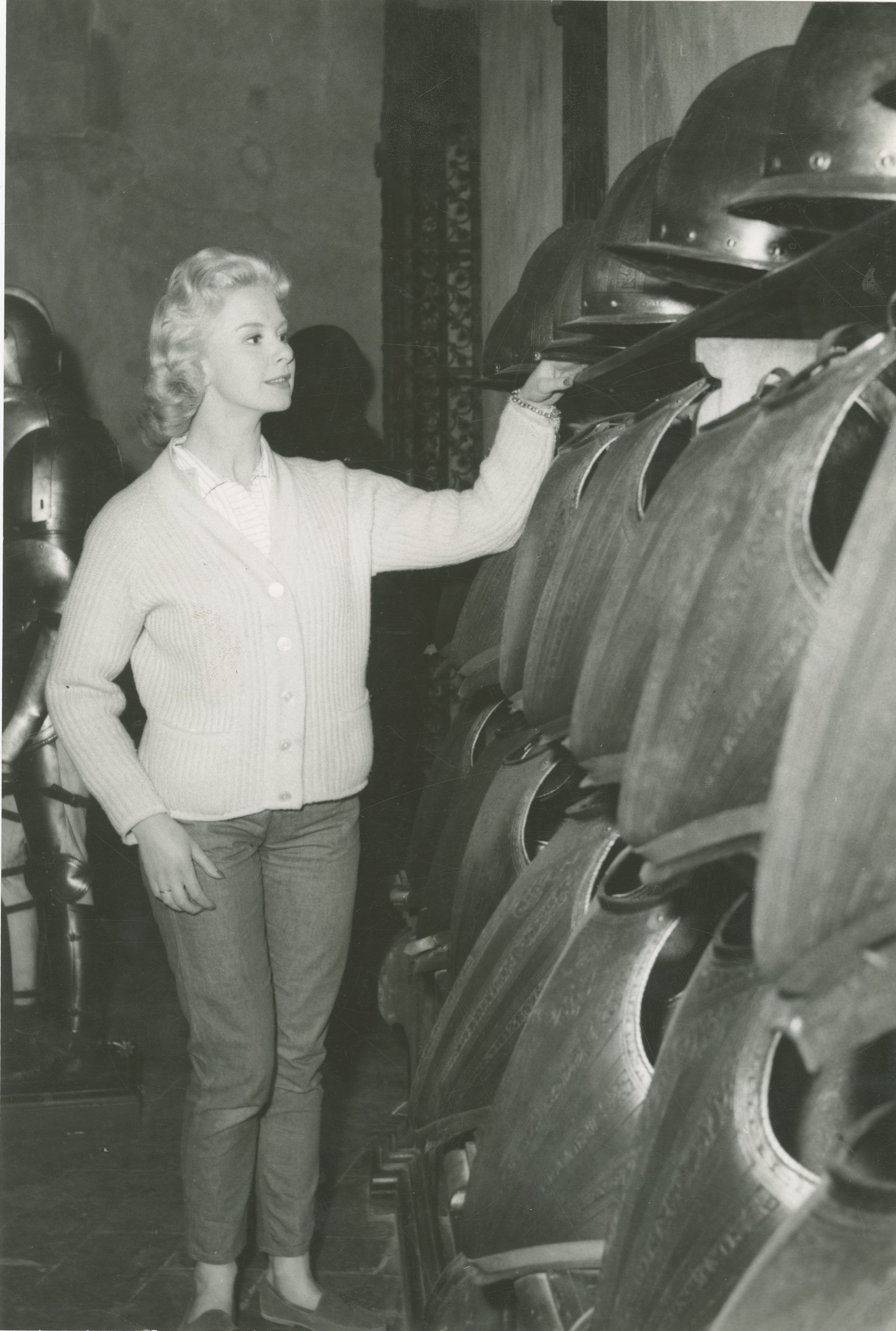
June Laverick in a scene

Souvenir d'Italie (English: It Happened in Rome) is a 1957 Italian film. It stars actor Gabriele Ferzetti.

== Plot ==
Riviera Ligure di Levante. Margaret is an English girl who travels aboard a white MG. After a mishap with some cyclists, she meets Hilde and Josette, a German and a French girl, who are hitchhiking. The three girls continue their journey together; but having run out of petrol, they push the car into the sea by mistake. They are then transported by the carabinieri in a jeep to Portofino.

After an understandable moment of discouragement, Margaret is convinced by the English consul of Portofino to continue the journey with her new companions. When they arrive in Venice, where a count offers them hospitality in his palace, the girls misunderstand the situation and believe they have ended up in an expensive hotel. Once the misunderstanding is cleared up, they quickly say goodbye to continue their journey, heading to Bologna. During a visit to an artistic site in Bologna (the guide is played by a young Dario Fo) Margaret meets Professor Parenti, whom she met in England, where he had been transferred as a prisoner of war: a feeling of friendship was born between the two, which the girl has not forgotten.

In Florence, Josette meets Sergio, an enterprising and boastful young man, who abandons his mature lover to get together with her. But before leaving his ex, he had robbed her, so the lady's complaint reaches him in Pisa, ruining his romantic plans. In the meantime, Hilde "clashes" and then falls in love with the Roman Gino. As for Josette, she meets a young lawyer. In the Italian edition, Margaret, on the other hand, has suffered a big disappointment: her love was not reciprocated; so she decides to return to England and, just before boarding the plane, she meets a young fellow countryman she had not seen for a long time, foreshadowing a new love story.

In the English version, It Happened in Rome, in a scene not included in the Italian version and not dubbed, the Italian love of the English Margaret, the mature professor of History of Art, played by Massimo Girotti finds her on the return plane. Hilde and Josette also say goodbye to their boyfriends, promising however to return as soon as possible.

== Movie locations ==
At the beginning of the film we see various areas of Liguria: Diano Marina, Ventimiglia and Finale Ligure. We see many glimpses and landscapes of the Alto Garda Trentino. The action then moves to other areas of Italy, Venice, Bologna, Florence, Pisa and Rome.

== Soundtrack ==
Music by Lelio Luttazzi. The film features the 1955 song of the same name, composed by the aforementioned Luttazzi (music), Giulio Scarnicci and Renzo Tarabusi, originally - but not in this film - performed by Jula de Palma and reinterpreted abroad by various other singers, including Perry Como.

== Criticism ==
«A lively little comedy...» **

== Cast ==
- Isabelle Corey: Josette
- June Laverick: Margaret
- Ingeborg Schöner: Hilde
- Gabriele Ferzetti: Lawyer Alberto Cortini
- Massimo Girotti: Ugo Parenti
- Alberto Sordi: Sergio Battistini
- Vittorio De Sica: the Count
- Dario Fo: Carlino
- Antonio Cifariello: Gino
- Isabel Jeans: Cynthia
- Mario Carotenuto
- Francesco Mulè: Lawyer Andrea Mazzoni
