= The Gypsy and the Gentleman =

1958 British film by Joseph Losey

- Directed by: Joseph Losey
- Screenplay by: Janet Green
- Based on: Darkness I Leave You; 1956 novel by Nina Warner Hooks
- Produced by: Earl St. John
- Starring: Melina Mercouri; Keith Michell; Flora Robson
- Cinematography: Jack Hildyard
- Edited by: Reginald Beck
- Music by: Hans May
- Production company: Rank Organisation Film Productions
- Distributed by: Rank Film Distributors
- Release dates: 15 January 1958 (London, UK)
- Running time: 103 min.
- Country: United Kingdom
- Language: English
- Budget: nearly $1 million

The Gypsy and the Gentleman is a 1958 British costume drama film directed by Joseph Losey. It stars Melina Mercouri and Keith Michell.

== Plot ==
The beautiful and fiery gypsy Belle (Melina Mercouri) marries Regency playboy Sir Paul Deverill (Keith Michell) for his money. Unbeknownst to her he has squandered his fortune and is desperately in debt. When Deverill's sister Sarah (June Laverick) inherits a fortune, the couple hatch a plan to kidnap her. Sarah is loved by the young Dr Forrester and is looked after by a retired actress, Mrs Haggard. A corrupt lawyer, Brook, also gets involved.

Deverill eventually sides with his sister against Belle and her gypsy lover, Jess. He rescues his sister and crashes into the water with Belle. Bella watches Jess flee, and then she and Deverill drown in the river.

== Cast ==
- Melina Mercouri as Belle
- Keith Michell as Sir Paul Deverill
- Flora Robson as Mrs. Haggard
- Patrick McGoohan as Jess
- June Laverick as Sarah Deverill
- Lyndon Brook as John Patterson
- Helen Haye as Lady Caroline Ayrton
- Mervyn Johns as Brook
- Laurence Naismith as Dr. Forrester
- Clare Austin as Vanessa Ruddock
- Catherine Feller as Hattie
- Nigel Green as Game Pup
- Newton Blick as Ruddock
- David Hart as Will the Valet
- John Salew as Duffin the Butler
- Louis Aquilina as Coco.

== Production ==
=== Development ===
Joseph Losey had been offered a three-picture deal with Rank at the recommendation of Dirk Bogarde; the director was also admired by James Archibald, who was a Rank executive. Losey was going to make a film with Bogarde, Bird of Paradise based on The Man Who Broke the Bank at Monte Carlo but was unable to raise finance. Rank sent him a number of other scripts which he rejected, but Losey eventually agreed to make The Gypsy and the Gentleman. "I didn't like it much, but I thought well, I can’t go on turning down scripts," said Losey. "I’ve got to work — and I can make something out of this."

It was Losey's idea to cast Melina Mercouri, who he remembered from Stella. Mercouri later wrote she was "scraping the bottom of the barrel when" offered the job and during filming "knew I was giving a poor performance, but" Losey "never stopped trying... But I just couldn’t make it. I couldn’t connect with the character."

Michael Craig, then under contract to Rank, declined the male lead role, and was replaced by another Rank contract player, Keith Michell. Muriel Pavlow, who was under contract to Rank, was offered a role but turned it down "foolishly because, although it was a rubbishy film, it was directed by Joseph Losey."

Losey said "I had decided that we should make an extravagant melodrama and at the same time try and present something of the real feeling of the Regency period where there were no toilets, and people bathed once a week if they were lucky, in a tub, and the gentlemen, when they got drunk, pissed in the fireplace. Of a period that was cruel and dirty and not just lovely and elegant — with brutal boxing matches and all the rest."

=== Shooting ===
Filming took place from 11 June to September 1957 at Pinewood Studios and on location at Oxhey. Losey did not enjoy filming, calling produced Maurice Cowan a "monster" although he felt with the cinematographer, Mercouri, the designer and editor "we were really able to make something." Losey said he "had no artistic control, but it had been agreed that I would control the cutting of the picture, the music and the general finishing. The studio in general wasn’t very happy. They didn’t understand what I was doing; they didn’t understand what Melina’s virtues were — and she has many, chiefly enormous energy."

Losey says that when the film finished "it became subject to horrible executive interferences from all kinds of sources". He fell out with John Davis and Rank insisted on a score by Hans May which the director said "changed the mood and the pace to such a degree, that for the first and only time in my life I left the picture before it was finished."

== Reception ==
Variety magazine wrote:

Harking, back to the British film days of such successful pix as “The Wicked Lady" and “The Man in Grey,” there Is genuine reason to believe that “Gypsy” may make an equal financial sweep in Britain. Nevertheless; this is a dusty, sprawling, no-holds-barred costume melodrama, which utilizes every possible cliche in the romantic “meller” hook. Yet it has appeal because of its simple attack on b.o. potentiality; It gets away with it because. a good cast plays it for more than it is worth. The slightest case of “tongue-in-cheek” and this old-fashioned drama would have fallen flat, on its face.

Losey said the film failed at the box office. "I think it could have been a success, with very little differences: just a proper score, proper cutting, and proper handling of it. I think the images are very satisfying, but otherwise I don’t like it."

“I think it’s largely a piece of junk, and I’d just as soon nobody saw it again.”—Josey Losey in a 1971 interview with critic Gordon Gow

John Davis, managing director of Rank, then cancelled the rest of Losey's contract. "He settled it, as I recall, for one-tenth of what they contractually owed me," said Losey. "And everybody in England knew that I had, in effect, been fired. So there again, it didn’t establish me in England."

Filmink argued "there’s actually no reason why this shouldn’t have worked, but the result was a mess. It has so much good stuff going for it, but the plotting is poor, and the characters are unclear; it doesn’t understand what made Gainsborough melodramas work (like pretty much every attempt at Gainsborough melodrama made post-Maurice Ostrer)."

== Theme ==
The film marks the first film in which Losey approaches the class themes that would become central to his subsequent work, particularly in The Servant (1963) and The Go-Between (1971) An American by birth and upbringing (he was born to a wealthy and politically conservative family in La Crosse, Wisconsin), Losey adopted leftist and class-oriented views during the 1930s.

Arriving in England in 1951, age 42, he was “impressed by the powerful hold of the class system over English society.” Losey attempted to fully examine aspects of class hierarchy in The Gypsy and the Gentleman, but was cautioned not to do so by the studio. Biographer Foster Hirsch observes that nonetheless, “Losey’s tentative reading of the class theme gives the film whatever interest it has.”

Notably, Losey maintains an “ironic distance” from both the proletarian and aristocratic figures in this historical romance.

== Sources ==
- Callahan, Dan. 2003. Losey, Joseph. Senses of Cinema, March 2003. Great Directors Issue 25.https://www.sensesofcinema.com/2003/greatdirectors/losey/#:~:text=The%20dominant%20themes%20of%20Losey's,love%20story%20in%20his%20films. Accessed 12 October, 2024.
- Gow, Gordon. 1971. Weapons: Joseph Losey in an Interview with Gordon Gow. Films and Filming 18, no. 1, (October 1971): pp. 37–41
- Hirsch, Foster. 1980. Joseph Losey. Twayne Publishers, Boston, Massachusetts. ISBN 0-8057-9257-0
- Palmer, James and Riley, Michael. 1993. The Films of Joseph Losey. Cambridge University Press, Cambridge, England. ISBN 0-521-38386-2

== Citations ==
- Caute, David (1994). Joseph Losey. Oxford University Press.
- Losey, Joseph (1985). Conversations with Losey. Methuen.
