= CIA contro KGB =

L'Ordre et la sécurité du monde
- Directed by: Claude d'Anna
- Written by: Claude D'Anna; Marie-Françoise Bonin
- Produced by: Henry Lange; François Lesterlin
- Starring: Bruno Cremer; Donald Pleasence; Laure Dechasnel; Dennis Hopper; Joseph Cotten; Gabriele Ferzetti
- Cinematography: Edouard Van Der Enden
- Edited by: Renaud Peltier; Kenout Peltier
- Music by: Claude Nougaro; Maurice Vander
- Distributed by: Cinema International Corporation (France)
- Release date: 1978
- Running time: 105 minutes
- Countries: France; Italy
- Languages: French; English

L'Ordre et la sécurité du monde (Italian title: CIA contro KGB, US title: Last In, First Out) is a 1978 French-Italian film. It stars Bruno Cremer, Donald Pleasence and Gabriele Ferzetti.

== Cast ==
- Bruno Cremer as Lucas Richter
- Dennis Hopper as Medford
- Donald Pleasence as Rothko
- Laure Dechasnel as Hélène Lehman
- Joseph Cotten as Foster Johnson
- Gabriele Ferzetti as Herzog
- Michel Bouquet as Banquier Muller
- Pierre Santini as Martial Kauffer
