= Vertigine d'amore =

1950 film

- Directed by: Luigi Capuano
- Written by: Luigi Capuano; Guido De Luca; Maurice Druon; Thyde Monnier
- Produced by: Belisario L. Randone
- Starring: Gabriele Ferzetti
- Cinematography: Mario Albertelli
- Distributed by: Variety Distribution
- Release date: 23 February 1949
- Countries: Italy; France
- Language: Italian

Vertigine d'amore (French: Le Pain des pauvres) is a 1949 Italian-French melodrama film directed by Luigi Capuano.

== Cast ==
- Gabriele Ferzetti
- Gabrielle Fontan
- Folco Lulli – Luca / France: Romain Toucas
- Piero Lulli – Olivero / France: Ollivier Desmichels
- Marcello Mastroianni
- Livia Muguet – Gina
- Elli Parvo – Silvana Resplanton / France: Sylvaine Resplandin
- Jone Salinas – Fifi'
- Bella Starace Sainati – Lucia / France: Louisa
- Charles Vanel – Mugnaio Resplanton / France: Emile Resplandin
