= Modern Virgin =

- French film poster
- Italian: Vergine moderna
- Directed by: Marcello Pagliero
- Written by: Ennio Flaiano; Giacomo Guerrini
- Cinematography: Mario Montuori
- Music by: Nino Rota
- Release date: 22 September 1954
- Country: Italy
- Language: Italian

Modern Virgin (Italian: Vergine moderna) is a 1954 Italian melodrama film. It stars actor Gabriele Ferzetti.

== Plot ==
The young Claudia wants to escape from the gray life of the provinces and aims for rich men, but each time with unhappy results. Only her brother can finally shake her from it.

== Cast ==
- Vittorio De Sica: Antonio Valli
- Gabriele Ferzetti: Gabriele Demico
- May Britt: Claudia Bardi
- Vittorio Sanipoli: Vittorio
- Teresa Pellati: Annadora
- Mirko Ellis: Giacomo
- Luca Ronconi: Andrea Bardi
- Tina Lattanzi: Sig.ra Bardi
- Angiolo Nosei: Prof. Bardi
- Giacomo Furia: Un commesso
