= Vestire gli ignudi =

1953 film by Marcello Pagliero

- Directed by: Marcello Pagliero
- Cinematography: Enzo Serafin
- Music by: Franco Mannino
- Release date: 1953
- Country: Italy
- Language: Italian

Vestire gli ignudi (Italian pronunciation: [veˈstiːre ʎʎ iɲˈɲuːdi]) is a 1953 Italian drama film directed by Marcello Pagliero and starring Gabriele Ferzetti. It is based on the play Vestire gli ignudi (Clothing the Naked) by Luigi Pirandello.

== Cast ==
- Gabriele Ferzetti as Ludovico Nota
- Eleonora Rossi Drago as Ersilia Drei
- Pierre Brasseur as Console Grotti
- Frank Latimore as Franco Laspiga
- Micheline Francey as Signora Grotti
