= Maddalena (1971 film) =

- Theatrical poster
- Directed by: Jerzy Kawalerowicz
- Written by: Sergio Bazzini; Jerzy Kawalerowicz
- Produced by: Franco Clementi; Joseph Fryd
- Starring: Lisa Gastoni; Eric Woofe; Ivo Garrani
- Cinematography: Gábor Pogány
- Edited by: Franco Arcalli
- Music by: Ennio Morricone
- Distributed by: International Coproductions (U.S); Cinema International Corporation (CIC) (Italy)
- Release dates: November 19, 1971 (New York City); 1972 (Italy)
- Running time: 113 minutes
- Countries: Italy; Yugoslavia
- Languages: Italian; English

Maddalena, also known as The Devil in Maddalena, is a 1971 drama film directed by Jerzy Kawalerowicz and starring Lisa Gastoni, Eric Woofe and Ivo Garrani. The film features a notable score by Ennio Morricone, including the composition "Chi Mai". A co-production between the Italian company Unitas Film and Yugoslavian company Bosna Film, it premiered in November 1971 in New York City, but its release in Italy was delayed until 1972 due to censorship issues.

== Plot ==
Maddalena is a young free-spirited woman who attends erotic parties while separated from her husband who will not grant her a divorce, after an apparent car accident. She is prone to strange and erotic themed flashbacks, some with biblical significance, which blur the line between reality and her own fantasies. At a party a blindfolded priest is led before her, and she decides to try to seduce him, seeing him as perhaps her salvation.

== Cast ==
- Lisa Gastoni: Maddalena
- Eric Woofe: Priest
- Ivo Garrani: Maddalena's husband
- Paolo Gozlino: Fisherman
- Barbara Pilavin: Priest's mother
- Ezio Marano: Priest's aid

== Production ==
=== Music ===
Despite featuring one of Morricone's best-known pieces, "Chi Mai", much of the score is described as "more psychedelic, with lots of percussion, vocalization and experimentation." Lisa Gastoni herself sings on the composition, "Chi Mai", while regular collaborators, Bruno Nicolai, Edda Dell'Orso, and Alessandro Alessandroni also perform on the score.

== Release ==
=== Home media ===
One 7 Movies released Maddalena on Blu-ray on September 21, 2021.
