= Gioventù alla sbarra =

1953 film by Ferruccio Cerio

- Directed by: Ferruccio Cerio
- Written by: Edoardo Anton
- Cinematography: Tonino Delli Colli
- Music by: Pippo Barzizza
- Distributed by: Variety Distribution
- Release date: 1953
- Country: Italy
- Language: Italian

Gioventù alla sbarra is a 1953 Italian crime-drama film directed by Ferruccio Cerio.

== Cast ==
- Giorgio Albertazzi as Marco
- Isa Barzizza as Florence - la canzonettista
- Aldo Bettoni
- Gemma Bolognesi
- Marilyn Buferd as Lilly
- Annette Ciarli
- Attilio Dottesio
- April Hennessy
- Ave Ninchi as La sorella del giudice
- Carlo Ninchi
- Vittorio Sanipoli
- Delia Scala as Franca
- Lilli Scaringi
- Massimo Serato as Gigi
- Paolo Stoppa as Il giudice Benni
- Henri Vidon
