= Gli anni struggenti =

1979 film

- Film poster
- Directed by: Vittorio Sindoni
- Written by: Nicola Badalucco, Vittorio Sindoni
- Produced by: Mario Gallo
- Cinematography: Safai Teherani
- Edited by: Angelo Curi
- Music by: Riz Ortolani
- Production company: Filmalpha
- Distributed by: Cidif Cad
- Release date: 1979
- Running time: 90 minutes
- Country: Italy
- Language: Italian

Gli anni struggenti (also titled II Concorrente) is a 1979 Italian film directed by Vittorio Sindoni and written by Nicola Badalucco with Sindoni. It stars Fabio Traversa, Laura Lenzi and Gabriele Ferzetti. It received a middling review from Variety in which it was compared to Ermamno Olmi's The Job.

== Cast ==
- Fabio Traversa: Saverio Bivona
- Laura Lenzi: Andreina
- Gabriele Ferzetti: Prof. Carmelo Bivona
- Marisa Traversi: Carmela, madre di Saverio
- Chiara Salerno: Grazia
- Giorgio Viterbo: Raffaele Cucinotta
- Nino Bontempo: Hotel night porter
- Paolo Fagone: Saverio as a child
