= Crucero de verano =

1964 film

- Directed by: Luis Lucia
- Release date: 1964
- Country: Italy
- Language: Italian

Crucero de verano is a 1964 Italian film directed by Luis Lucia. It stars actor Gabriele Ferzetti.
