= Come Play with Me (1968 film) =

1968 film

- A poster with the film's Italian title: Grazie, zia
- Directed by: Salvatore Samperi
- Written by: Salvatore Samperi; Sergio Bazzini; Pier Luigi Murgia
- Starring: Lisa Gastoni
- Cinematography: Aldo Scavarda
- Edited by: Silvano Agosti
- Music by: Ennio Morricone
- Release date: 30 April 1968 (Italy)
- Running time: 94 minutes
- Country: Italy
- Language: Italian

Come Play with Me (Italian: Grazie, zia) is a 1968 Italian drama film directed by Salvatore Samperi. It was listed to compete at the 1968 Cannes Film Festival, but the festival was cancelled due to the events of May 1968 in France. The English title is not a translation of the Italian one, which translates into English as "Thanks, Auntie".

== Plot ==
Alvise is a young man who thinks he is paralyzed. He receives treatment for his psychological problem. His father leaves Alvise for a few days in the care of Aunt Lea, who is Alvise's mother's sister. Alvise becomes infatuated with his aunt and Lea also reciprocates gradually. Lea breaks off her relationship with Stefano o be with her nephew. Alvise promises to make love to Lea if she plays with him and beats him at any of the games. Lea and Alvise play a number of games leading to the ultimate game of euthanasia.

== Cast ==
- Lisa Gastoni as Aunt Lea
- Lou Castel as Alvise
- Gabriele Ferzetti as Stefano
- Luisa De Santis as Nicoletta (the singer)
- Massimo Sarchielli as Massimo
- Nicoletta Rizzi as the secretary of Alvise's father
- Anita Dreyer as Barbara
