= Four Queens for an Ace =

- Directed by: Jacques Poitrenaud
- Written by: Georges Bardawil; Gérard Carlier; Jacques Poitrenaud; Jean-Loup Dabadie
- Starring: Roger Hanin; Sylva Koscina
- Cinematography: Manolo Merino
- Edited by: Pierre Gillette
- Music by: Serge Gainsbourg
- Color process: Eastmancolor
- Production companies: Société Française de Cinématographie; Ágata Films S.A. Ci.Ti. Cinematografica; Leone Film Group
- Distributed by: Compagnie Commerciale Française Cinématographique
- Release date: 5 October 1966
- Running time: 95 minutes
- Countries: France; Italy; Spain
- Language: French

Four Queens for an Ace (French: Carré de dames pour un as, Spanish: Demasiadas mujeres para Layton, Italian: Layton... bambole e karatè, also known as An Ace and Four Queens) is a 1966 French-Spanish-Italian spy film, directed by Jacques Poitrenaud and starring Roger Hanin and Sylva Koscina. It is based on a novel by Michael Loggan.

== Plot ==
International spy Hakim Gregory escapes from prison by killing a number of guards. With his accomplices, Dolores and Jesus, he flees to Málaga, Spain and pays a doctor to alter his appearance using plastic surgery. Once the task is completed, Jesus kills the doctor. Four agents of the French Secret Service, tasked with finding Halim are killed. The organization then tells its ace of aces, Agent Dan Layton to find Hakim.

Layton arrives in Malaga, disguised as an elegant playboy and flanked blonde Petula, another French agent, posing as a wealthy heiress. Unbeknown to Layton's fiancée, tour guide Marion, is that Layton is a secret agent. Layton and Petula check into a hotel. While they are kissing on the sofa, they are interrupted by a knock on the door. Expecting a maid, Petula says, "Come in" and is surprised to see that it is Marion. She immediately grabs the blonde and punches her in the face. Kicking off their shoes, the two barefoot women engage in an energetic fistfight that Layton is unable to stop. Spilling into the hallway, Layton finally separates the two women as they are strangling each other.

Later that day, Layton finds himself in a poker game involving a number of shady men. Among them is Dolores, the co-owner of a fashion boutique with her boyfriend Mishra, who is later revealed to be Gregory's financier. Layton is accused of cheating by the others at the table and a fight ensues. Layton manages to defeat the other players and break free.

Suspecting a link between Dolores and Gregory, he breaks into her boutique that night. Mishra discovers that Layton has broken into the boutique and correctly assumes he is an agent looking for Gregory. Layton is assaulted that night by a man who Layton knocks unconscious in a fight. The man is carrying X-ryas that Layton deduces are meant for Gregory as they contain secret codes that will allow Gregory to further his criminal plans.

Gregory tells Dolores that Layton must be killed, but first they must recover the x-rays. During an arranged lunch, Dolores pulls a gun on Layton and forces him into her sports car. Tour guide Marion witnesses the event and follows them in the tour bus. At a traffic stop, Layton grabs the gun and forces Dolores to drive to her apartment where they can have a drink and work things out. Marion's tour bus is blocked in traffic but she abandons her tour group and chases Layton on foot. Mishra and the henchman discover the Dolors and Layton, and knock Layton unconscious after retrieving the X-rays. They carry him out to one of the boutique's clothing vans, being watched by Marion. Before it departs, Marion climbs into back of the van and hides between racks of clothes. The van stops at a bull ranch and Layton, tied up, is taken to a barn to await his fate.

Tired of the affair, Dolores has a change of heart and unties Layton, allowing him to escape. But first, she kisses him. Marion enters the barn, sees Dolorès kissing Layton and starts another catfight. Gregory and his henchmen arrive as well as Petula and a police officer. A brawl breaks out among all participants. One of the henchmen drops his cigarette, setting the barn on fire. Petula rushes over to Layton to see if he is alright, but is quickly attacked by Marion and the two women engage in another fight. Gregory then shoots Mishrah. Layton shoots Gregory, frees everyone, and flees in turn with Marion.

== Cast ==
- Roger Hanin as Dan Layton
- Sylva Koscina as Dolorès
- Catherine Allégret as Marion
- Dominique Wilms as Petula
- Laura Valenzuela as Rosaria
- François Maistre as Hakim Gregory
- Luis Pena as Mishra
- Guy Delorme as Jésus
- Serge Gainsbourg as man asking for a lighter

== Reception ==
The film is generally regarded as an amusing tongue-in-cheek Eurospy film. One criticism of the movie is it’s misogynistic take on women fighting over Layton.
