= L'amica =

- Directed by: Alberto Lattuada
- Written by: Alberto Lattuada; Mario Cecchi Gori; Gianni Vernuccio
- Starring: Lisa Gastoni; Gabriele Ferzetti
- Edited by: Sergio Montanari
- Music by: Luis Enríquez Bacalov
- Release date: 1969
- Country: Italy
- Language: Italian

L'amica is a 1969 Italian film. It stars actor Gabriele Ferzetti.

== Cast ==
- Lisa Gastoni: Lisa Marchesi
- Gabriele Ferzetti: Mario Marchesi
- Elsa Martinelli: Carla Nervi
- Jean Sorel: Franco Raimondi
- Frank Wolff: Guido Nervi
- Ray Lovelock: Claudio Nervi
- Marina Coffa: Giovanna
- Sergio Serafini: assistant Dr. Nervi
