= Chi mai =

Composition by Ennio Morricone

"Chi mai" (Italian for "Whoever") is a composition by Ennio Morricone written in 1971. It was first used in the film Maddalena (1971), later in the films Le Professionnel directed by Georges Lautner (1981), as well as in the television series An Englishman's Castle (1978). In 1981, it was used as the theme music for the BBC series The Life and Times of David Lloyd George and the BBC release of the theme reached number 2 on the UK Singles Chart.

== Composition ==
Elements of the melody of "Chi mai" appeared in a piece entitled "Invito All'Amore" from the 1968 Sergio Corbucci Spaghetti Western, The Great Silence. The original Italian lyrics for this song were written by Carlo Nistri and published by Ricordi (1972).

"Chi mai" is also famous in France for being used for a Royal Canin 1980s commercial, to the point that it is more closely associated with the commercial than with its other appearances, including Dunhill in 1987. In 2002, this association was referenced by the French movie, Asterix & Obelix: Mission Cleopatra, in a scene in which Dogmatix is chasing a legionnaire running on all fours in slow motion (like in the commercial) while "Chi mai" is playing in the background.

"Chi mai" was used as the melody for the last tribute to Jean-Paul Belmondo, in the post mortem national ceremony held on 9 September 2021, three days after Belmondo's death. "Chi mai" was also used for an exhibition performed at the 1995 European Championships by 1994 World Figure Skating pairs champions Evgenia Shishkova and Vadim Naumov.

== Online community ==
"Chi mai" is also the name of the online community about Ennio Morricone.

== Charts ==
=== Weekly charts ===
Chart (1981–1982)	Peak position
Austria (Ö3 Austria Top 40)	4
France (SNEP)	1
New Zealand (Recorded Music NZ)	11
Switzerland (Schweizer Hitparade)	2
UK Singles (OCC)	2
West Germany (GfK)	23

=== Year-end charts ===
Chart (1982)	Position
Switzerland (Schweizer Hitparade)	20

== Certifications ==
Certifications for Chi Mai
Region	Certification	Certified units/sales
France (SNEP)	Gold	900,000
United Kingdom (BPI)	Gold	500,000^{^}
^{^} Shipments figures based on certification alone.
