= Million Dollar Eel =

1971 film

- Directed by: Salvatore Samperi
- Written by: Aldo Lado; Salvatore Samperi
- Cinematography: Franco Di Giacomo
- Edited by: Franco Arcalli
- Music by: Fiorenzo Carpi
- Release date: 1971
- Country: Italy
- Language: Italian

Million Dollar Eel (Italian: Un'anguilla da 300 milioni) is a 1971 Italian comedy film. It stars actor Gabriele Ferzetti.

== Cast ==
- Ottavia Piccolo as Margherita 'Tina' Tellini
- Lino Toffolo as Giovanni Boscolo 'Bissa'
- Mario Adorf as Nane Mora
- Rodolfo Baldini as Lino
- Gabriele Ferzetti as Vasco
- Senta Berger as Countess Spodani
- Daniele Dublino as Priest
- Ricky Gianco as Barman
