= Escalation (1968 Italian film) =

1968 Italian film by Roberto Faenza

- Directed by: Roberto Faenza
- Written by: Roberto Faenza
- Cinematography: Luigi Kuveiller
- Edited by: Ruggero Mastroianni
- Music by: Ennio Morricone
- Release date: February 29, 1968 (Italy)
- Running time: 89 minutes
- Country: Italy
- Language: Italian

Escalation is a 1968 Italian film directed and written by Roberto Faenza and starring Claudine Auger and Gabriele Ferzetti.

== Cast ==
- Lino Capolicchio as Luca Lambertenghi
- Claudine Auger as Carla Maria Manini
- Gabriele Ferzetti as Augusto Lambertenghi
- Didi Perego as L'investigatrice privata
- Leopoldo Trieste as Il sacerdote/ il santone
- Paola Corinti
- Dada Gallotti
- Jacqueline Perrier
- Madeline Smith as girl on bicycle (uncredited)

== Reception ==
The Monthly Film Bulletin wrote: "Dealing as it does with the development of a peace-loving egalitarian into an impassive murderer and ruthless businessman, it seems likely that Escalation was intended as L'Enfance d'un Chef – Italian style. But the comparison with Sartre proves as hollow as the more obvious one with Antonioni (for the scene changes not so much from London to Milan as from the swinging world of Blow-Up [1966] to the sterile wasteland of The Red Desert [1964]). And although the artistic and philosophical pretensions of Roberto Faenza's first feature film seem to demand serious analysis, the disparity between intention and achievement is great enough to warrant a rather curt dismissal. Scenes like the final funeral procession display a real talent for visual composition, but Faenza seems constantly more concerned with lending a symbolic weight to his material than with what it actually signifies. Lino Capolicchio's interpretation of the generational hero as a blabbering moron further undermines the film's claims to seriousness. Perhaps Italian audiences are more attuned to this type of buffoon humour, but the idiom makes it hard for Anglo-Saxons to determine whether he's supposed to be like Hamlet or just Harpo Marx."
