= The Son of Robin Hood =

1958 film directed by George Sherman

- British theatrical poster
- Directed by: George Sherman
- Written by: George W. George; George F. Slavin
- Produced by: George Sherman
- Starring: David Hedison; June Laverick
- Cinematography: Arthur Grant
- Edited by: Alan Osbiston
- Music by: Leighton Lucas
- Color process: Color by DeLuxe
- Production company: Argo Productions
- Distributed by: 20th Century Fox
- Release dates: November 1958 (UK); July 1959 (USA)
- Running time: 81 minutes
- Country: United Kingdom
- Language: English

The Son of Robin Hood is a 1958 British CinemaScope adventure film directed by George Sherman, starring David Hedison and June Laverick.

== Plot ==
Ten years after Robin Hood died, his band of merry men in the forest is ageing and depleted. The villainous Des Roches covets the English throne, and has locked Robert, the Prince Regent, in his dungeon to persuade him to sign the throne over to him. But the merry men have been in touch with Deering Hood in Spain, who they believe is Robin Hood's son, and Deering is heading for England to help. By chance, the Prince Regent's brother, Jamie, is also on his way to help his brother, and when he is attacked by Des Roches's guard as he comes ashore, Deering comes to his help. When Jamie goes to thank Deering it is revealed that she is not the son of Robin Hood but his daughter.

The roles are reversed on the way to the forest, when Deering and Little John are attacked by Des Roches's horseman, and Jamie comes to their aid. Despite Deering's protests, Little John persuades Jamie to pretend to be the son of Robin Hood, and Deering to pretend to be his page. A spy informs Des Roches of the merry men's plans. When Des Roches and his men attack their camp, Deering Hood demonstrates that she has her father's skill with a bow and arrow by shooting a soldier out of a tree to ensure their hiding place is not discovered.

Robert's brother Jamie is locked up in the dungeon in the next cell. He calls out to him "Robert, Robert" but Robert does not believe it is his real brother, saying that he lies in a foreign grave. Jamie takes off a ring and ties it to some string and swings it to the next cell. When Robert sees the ring, his brother tells him that it is the ring which nobody else knows about that he gave him when he left for a foreign land, and so he realises that it really is his brother Jamie. Jamie tells Robert that there is a plan to break him out of the dungeon.

Jamie is taken to torture a forester Des Roches has captured. Jamie delays the torture until a guard interrupts with a blue cloak dropped by Deering Hood when she went to shoot the Hawk carrying a message from the traitor lady in the priory. Des Roches cries "seize him", but he uses the dagger given to him to torture the forester and takes the guard's sword. There is a sword fight and he frees the imprisoned forester. Together they escape and open the gate to the secret tunnel, letting Little John, Deering and some of Robin Hood's allies into the castle of Des Roches. Jamie then goes back to fight Des Roches, and kills him. Little John fights with the guards and lowers the drawbridge to let the rest of Robin Hood's men in, and the castle is secured. Des Roches had gained the support of many lords and their knights who are gathering for the coronation of the King in Winchester, but now without his leadership they can support the King in place of Des Roches. Jamie declares his love for Deering and they kiss as acceptance of marriage. Jamie pardons Des Roches's sister Sylvia, as she helped their cause to defeat Des Roches.

== Cast ==
- David Hedison as Jamie (as Al Hedison)
- June Laverick as Deering Hood
- David Farrar as Duke Simon Des Roches
- Marius Goring as Earl of Chester
- Philip Friend as Baron Charles Dorchester
- Delphi Lawrence as Lady Sylvia
- George Coulouris as Alan A. Dale
- George Woodbridge as Little John
- Humphrey Lestocq as Blunt
- Noel Hood as Prioress
- Shelagh Fraser as Constance
- Jack Lambert as Will Scarlet
- Oliver Johnston as apothecary
- Russell Napier as Squire Miles
- Alastair Hunter as 1st woodsman

== Critical reception ==
Leonard Maltin called the film a "Bland forest tale". Sky Cinema praised "The hearty features" of George Woodbridge as a "robust Little John", though was less happy with the "somewhat rum casting" of George Coulouris as Alan A'Dale, but concluded, "Otherwise characterisation is in the best, full-blooded comic-strip tradition, as is the action, handled in highly professional style by the director. Laverick's finest hour."
