= The Pagans (film) =

1953 film by Ferruccio Cerio

- Directed by: Ferruccio Cerio
- Cinematography: Tonino Delli Colli
- Music by: Franco Ferrara
- Distributed by: Variety Distribution
- Release date: 1953
- Country: Italy

The Pagans (Italian: Il Sacco di Roma, USA re-issue title: The Barbarians) is a 1953 Italian film directed by Ferruccio Cerio. Based on the 1527 historical event, this film tells the story of the taking of Rome by the Spanish armies of Charles V.

== Plot ==
In 1527 Rome was torn apart by the war between the Orsini fraction and that of the Colonna. Meanwhile, Spanish troops and lansquenets march to conquer the city.

Angela Orsini and Massimo Colonna, the two representatives of the noble families, love and marry in secret, but during the ceremony Angela's father bursts in and challenges Massimo to a duel. The latter juggles to avoid the clash, but a dagger thrown by a hitman of Tancredi Serra who demands the hand of Angela, kills the old Orsini. Massimo is forced to flee Rome, but returns there after the city is besieged, and before going to fight he makes a peace agreement with the Orsini to prove his innocence and love for Angela.

The city is taken and the last to resist take refuge in Castel Sant'Angelo. The leader of the resistance, Massimo, then manages to break the circle of the besiegers thanks to the help of a certain Fanfulla from Lodi, freeing the defenders.

Meanwhile, Angela learns from the assassin, now dying, the true version of the killing of her father: now nothing can prevent the marriage between her and Massimo.

== Cast ==
- Pierre Cressoy as Massimo Colonna
- Hélène Rémy as Angela Orsini
- Vittorio Sanipoli as Tancredi Serra
- Luigi Tosi as Benvenuto Cellini
- Annamaria Bugliari as Giulia
- Alfredo Varelli as Pope Clement VII
- Franco Fabrizi: Fanfulla da Lodi
