= Doppia coppia con Regina =

- Directed by: Julio Buchs
- Starring: Marisa Mell
- Cinematography: Mario Montuori
- Music by: Gianni Ferrio
- Release date: 1972
- Country: Italy
- Language: Italian

Doppia coppia con Regina (Spanish: Alta tensión) is a 1972 Spanish-Italian film directed by Julio Buchs. It stars Marisa Mell and Gabriele Ferzetti.

== Cast ==
- Marisa Mell as Laura Moncada
- Gabriele Ferzetti as Pablo Moncada
- Juan Luis Galiardo as José
- Helga Liné as Choni
- Patrizia Adiutori as Elisa Folbert
- Eduardo Calvo as Il cieco
