= Mon premier amour =

- Directed by: Élie Chouraqui
- Written by: Élie Chouraqui
- Produced by: Jean-Claude Bourlat; Elie Chouraqui
- Starring: Anouk Aimée; Richard Berry; Nathalie Baye
- Cinematography: Bernard Zitzermann
- Edited by: Marie-Josèphe Yoyotte
- Music by: Michel Legrand
- Distributed by: Gaumont Distribution
- Release date: 1978
- Running time: 100 minutes
- Country: France
- Language: French

Mon premier amour is a 1978 French film.

== Cast ==
- Anouk Aimée - Jane Romain
- Richard Berry - Richard
- Nathalie Baye - Fabienne
- Gabriele Ferzetti - Georges
- Jacques Villeret - Jacques Labrousse
- Gilles Ségal - Professor
- Nicole Seguin - Carole
- Arlette Gordon - Sarah
- Jacques Ebner - Night porter
- René Bouloc - Taxi driver
- Stéphane Nachba - Richard, child
- Bernard-Pierre Donnadieu - Café owner
