= Porci con la P 38 =

- Directed by: Gianfranco Pagani
- Music by: Pippo Caruso
- Release date: 1979
- Country: Italy
- Language: Italian

Porci con la P 38 is a 1979 Italian "poliziottesco" film directed by Gianfranco Pagani. It stars actor Gabriele Ferzetti.

== Cast ==
- Marc Porel as Morris
- Laura Belli as Gloria
- Raymond Pellegrin as Olden
- Luciano Pigozzi as John (as Alan Collins)
- Gabriele Ferzetti as Max Astarita
- Lea Lander as Astarita's Lover

== Plot ==
A police inspector investigates three murders between an old boss of the Mafia, and two of his men. When the daughter of the Commissioner is kidnapped by a former ally of the old boss, the wife of the Commissioner is being blackmailed and forced to steal a lighter from police offices. The former ally of the old mafia is killed by his mistress and the Commissioner can rescue his daughter.
