= The Woman Who Invented Love =

- Film poster
- Directed by: Ferruccio Cerio
- Written by: Guido Da Verona (novel); Alessandro De Stefani; Ferruccio Cerio
- Produced by: Antonio Gentile
- Starring: Silvana Pampanini; Rossano Brazzi; Mariella Lotti
- Cinematography: Anchise Brizzi
- Edited by: Mario Bonotti
- Music by: Salvatore Allegra
- Production company: Produzioni B.B.
- Distributed by: Variety Distribution
- Release date: 2 August 1952
- Running time: 90 minutes
- Country: Italy
- Language: Italian

The Woman Who Invented Love (Italian: La donna che inventò l'amore) is a 1952 Italian historical melodrama film written and directed by Ferruccio Cerio and starring Silvana Pampanini, Rossano Brazzi and Mariella Lotti. It was shot at the Cinecittà Studios in Rome. The film's sets were designed by the art director Marcello Avenati.

== Cast ==
- Silvana Pampanini as Antonella
- Rossano Brazzi as Conte Grilli
- Juan de Landa as Usuraio Passadonato
- Piero Carnabuci as Corteggiatore di Antonella
- Mariella Lotti as Nini
- Lauro Gazzolo as Marchese Doria
- Vittorio Sanipoli as Caddulo
- Laura Gore as Malvina
- Wanda Capodaglio
- Claudio Ermelli
- Renato Chiantoni

== Bibliography ==
- Poppi, Roberto. I registi: dal 1930 ai giorni nostri. Gremese Editore, 2002.
