= Trois milliards sans ascenseur =

Sette cervelli per un colpo perfetto
- Directed by: Roger Pigaut
- Written by: André G. Brunelin; Roger Pigaut; Lucio Fulci
- Produced by: Andre Cohen
- Starring: Michel Bouquet; Marcel Bozzufi; Dany Carrel; Gabriele Ferzetti
- Cinematography: Jean Tournier
- Edited by: Gilbert Natot
- Music by: Teo Usuelli
- Release date: 1972
- Countries: France; Italy
- Language: French
- Box office: $4.6 million

Trois milliards sans ascenseur (Translation: Three Billions Without an Elevator) (Italian: Sette cervelli per un colpo perfetto/ Seven Brains for a Perfect Shot) is a 1972 French-Italian film, directed by Roger Pigaut. It stars actor Gabriele Ferzetti. The script was co-written by Lucio Fulci.

== Plot ==
A group of likeable slackers with little talent attempts to steal a prestigious jewellery collection exhibited at the highest floor of a tower. What they lack in experience, they make up for with street smarts. They think the stakes are too high for them, so they subcontract the heist, but swindle the subcontractor. They try to blackmail the exhibition's insurance agency, but end up tricked.

== Cast ==
- Michel Bouquet as Albert
- Serge Reggiani as Pierrot
- Marcel Bozzuffi as Gus
- Dany Carrel as Lulu
- Victor Lanoux as Gino
- Gabriele Ferzetti as Raphaël
- Françoise Rosay as Mme Dubreuil
- Bernard Fresson as Julien
- Amidou as José
- Niké Arrighi as Minouche
- Pierre Rousseau
