= Marcello Pagliero =

Italian film director, actor, and screenwriter

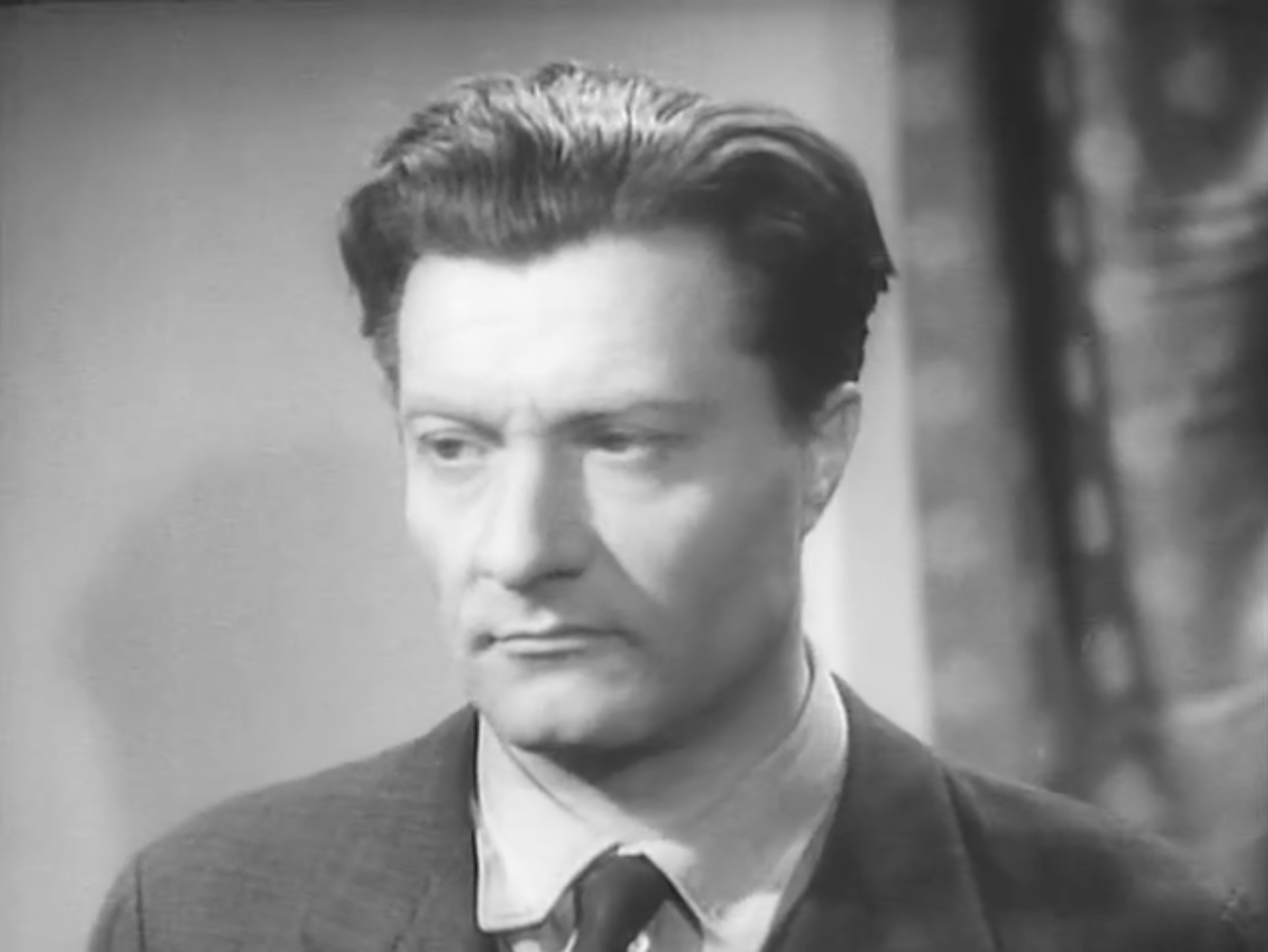
- Pagliero in Rome, Open City (1945)
- Born: 15 January 1907; London, United Kingdom
- Died: 18 October 1980 (aged 73); Paris, France
- Occupations: Film director, Screenwriter

Marcello Pagliero (15 January 1907 – 18 October 1980) was an Italian film director, actor, and screenwriter.

Pagliero was born in London and died in Paris. He is perhaps best known for his performance in the Roberto Rossellini film Rome, Open City (1945).

He moved to France in 1947, and continued to work in film until 1960 and in French television after that.

In 1949, he was nominated with six other co-writers for an Academy Award for Best Original Screenplay for the Rossellini film Paisan.

== Selected filmography ==
=== Director ===
- Mist on the Sea (1944)
- Desire (1946)
- Rome, Free City (1946)
- A Man Walks in the City (1950)
- The Red Rose (1951)
- The Lovers of Bras-Mort (1951)
- The Respectful Prostitute (1952)
- Vestire gli ignudi (1953)
- Daughters of Destiny (1954)
- Modern Virgin (1954)
- Chéri-Bibi (1955)
- Walk Into Paradise (1956) – French version
- 20,000 Leagues Across the Land (1961)

=== Screenwriter ===
- The Two Tigers (1941)
- Souls in Turmoil (1942)
- The Devil's Gondola (1946)
- Paisan (1946)

=== Actor ===
- Rome, Open City (1945) – Giorgio Manfredi
- Les jeux sont faits (1945) – Pierre Dumaine
- The Other (1947) – Ing. Andrea Venturi
- Dédée d'Anvers (1948) – Francesco
- The Voice of Dreams (1949) – Marcel
- Tourbillon (1953) – Julio Spoletti
- Seven Thunders (1957) – Salvatore
- Le bel âge (1960) – Steph
- Les Mauvais Coups (1961) – Luigi
- Symphonie pour un massacre (1963) – Cerutti (uncredited)
- Ton ombre est la mienne (1963) – Dr. Rouvier
- Nick Carter and Red Club (1965) – Prof. Witt (uncredited)
- Les Gauloises bleues (1968) – Le marchand bohémien
