= Ferruccio Cerio =

Italian film director

Ferruccio Cerio (25 September 1904 – 23 April 1963) was an Italian film writer and director.

== Filmography as a director ==
- Il cavaliere senza nome (1941)
- Villa da vendere (1941)
- L'ultimo addio (1942) (a.k.a. The Last Good-Bye)
- The Count of Monte Cristo (1943) (supervising director)
- La prigione (1944)
- Rosalba (1944)
- Posto di blocco (1945)
- The Howl (1948)
- Cita con mi viejo corazón (1950)
- O Noivo de Minha Mulher (1950)
- La donna che inventò l'amore (1952) (a.k.a. The Woman Who Invented Love)
- Il Sacco di Roma (1953) (a.k.a. The Pagans, The Barbarians)
- Gioventù alla sbarra (1953)
- Tripoli, Beautiful Land of Love (1954)
- El Diablo de vacaciones (1957)
