= Francesco Laudadio =

Italian director, screenwriter and producer (1950–2005)

- Born: 2 January 1950; Mola di Bari, Italy
- Died: 6 April 2005 (aged 55); Bologna, Italy
- Occupation: Director

Francesco Laudadio (2 January 1950 – 6 April 2005) was an Italian director, screenwriter and producer.

== Life and career ==
Born in Mola di Bari, graduated in philosophy, Laudadio started his career as a script supervisor and an assistant director, often working with Mario Monicelli. His debut film Grog won him the David di Donatello for Best New Director.

== Filmography ==
- Grog (1982)
- Fatto su misura (1985)
- Topo Galileo (1987)
- The Raffle (1991)
- Persone perbene (1992)
- Esercizi di stile (1996, segment "Un addio nel west")
- L'ultimo concerto (TV, 1996)
- Il mastino (TV, 1997)
- Inviati speciali (TV, 2001)
- Signora (2004)
