= El Diablo de vacaciones =

- Directed by: Ferruccio Cerio
- Starring: Mario Cabré; Ana María Cassan; Carlos Cores
- Release date: 1957
- Country: Argentina
- Language: Spanish

El Diablo de vacaciones is a 1957 Argentine film.
