= June Laverick =

English actress (1931–2017)

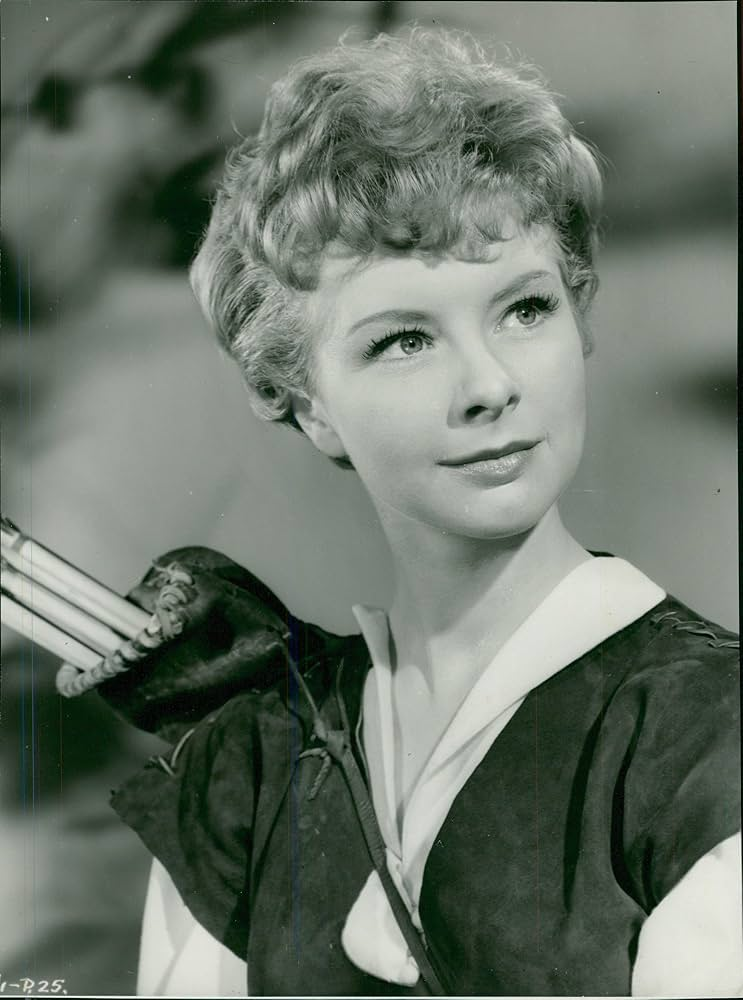
- Born: June Laverick; 11 June 1931; Redcar, North Riding of Yorkshire, England
- Died: 19 October 2017 (aged 86); Westminster, London, England
- Occupation: Actress
- Years active: 1950–1970
- Known for: The Duke Wore Jeans; The Son of Robin Hood; The Gypsy and the Gentleman

June Laverick (11 June 1931 — 19 October 2017) was an English actress, who was once described as "a popular lightweight leading actress of the day" and was probably best remembered as the fictional wife of Dickie Henderson in The Dickie Henderson Show.

== Background ==
Before June was born her parents ran a public house in Bishop Auckland but then returned to Redcar to run the Royal Hotel on the sea front near Redcar Pier. In 1931, Laverick was born in Laburnum Road, Redcar. In her youth June attended White House school and ballet school. She was determined at an early age that she wanted a career in light entertainment.

She followed an acting career in theatre, film and television and after retiring from acting in her 30s June moved back to Redcar, marrying an ICI process worker and briefly taking over the licence of the Royal Hotel before returning south alone.

== Stage, film and television career ==
In the 1950s June worked in the theatre in musicals, comedies and revues, and had a variety of film roles contracted to the Rank Organisation. She was a member of The Company of Youth, the Rank Organisation's acting school often referred to as "The Charm School" and was often photographed for the front covers of cinema magazines and for publicity shots. Her peak year in films was 1958, where she appeared in three prominent film roles, notably as the leading lady opposite Tommy Steele in The Duke Wore Jeans.

June made an early television appearance in an episode of Boyd Q.C. (1958) and in episodes of Tales from Dickens (1959) as Dora Spenlow. She was Norman Wisdom's leading lady in Follow a Star.

She took over the role of Dickie Henderson's wife from Anthea Askey in ITV's The Dickie Henderson Half Hour in The Dickie Henderson Show (1960–1963).

After the Dickie Henderson Show, June retired from acting to be replaced by Isla Blair in the next series A Present for Dickie (1969–1970). In 1970 June returned to appear in the last episode.

== Personal life and death ==
After her final appearance on television in the last episode of Dickie Henderson's show, she took over the licence, from her parents, of The Royal Hotel in Redcar. She was briefly married to Charles Kenneth Cooke, an ICI worker. After the marriage ended she returned to the south of England and spent her time living in Baker Street, London and became romantically linked with Hughie Green the Double Your Money television games show host in the 1960s.

Laverick died on 19 October 2017, at the age of 86.

== Selected stage ==
- When In Rome (1959–60) at the Adelphi Theatre, London a short-lived stage musical with Dickie Henderson and Eleanor Summerfield
- The Punch Revue (1955) at the Duke of York's Theatre, London with Binnie Hale and Alfie Bass
- Over the Moon (1952–53) at the Bristol Hippodrome with Cicely Courtneidge
- Gay's the Word (1952) at the Saville Theatre, London with Cicely Courtneidge
- Cinderella (1948) at the Royal Opera House, London.

== Filmography ==
- The Flesh and the Fiends (1960) (US: Mania) (1960) as Martha Knox, with Peter Cushing
- Follow a Star (1959) as Judy, with Norman Wisdom
- The Son of Robin Hood (1958) as Deering Hood daughter of Robin Hood
- The Duke Wore Jeans (1958) as Princess Maria, with Tommy Steele
- The Gypsy and the Gentleman (1958) as Sarah Deverill, with Melina Mercouri
- Souvenir d'Italie (1957) (US: It Happened in Rome) (1959) as Margaret
- Doctor at Large (1957) (uncredited minor role).

== Television ==
- The Stamp Collector (1963) with Dickie Henderson
- The Stately Home (1963) with Dickie Henderson
- The Romance (1962) with Dickie Henderson
- The Gangster (1962) with Dickie Henderson
- David and Dora (1962) as Dora Spenlow in Tales of Dickens
- The Psychiatrist (1960) with Dickie Henderson
- The Dancing Years as Greta Schone
- The Shropshire Lass (1958) with Michael Denison

== Discography ==
- Dickie Henderson (1960) Sympatica/It's Nice To Sleep With No-One, June Laverick, Oriole CB1536
- Stop (1960), Oriole CB1537
- When in Rome (1960), Oriole EP7026
