= Mendiants et orgueilleux =

- Directed by: Jacques Poitrenaud
- Starring: Georges Moustaki
- Release date: 1971
- Country: France

Mendiants et orgueilleux is a 1971 French film. It stars actor Gabriele Ferzetti.
