= Jacques Poitrenaud =

French film director and actor

Jacques Poitrenaud (22 May 1922, Lille – died 2 April 2005, Paris) was a French film director and actor.

== Director ==
- 1956: Saint-Germain-en-Laye, cité royale (Short)
- 1957: Enfants, Touraine (Short)
- 1960: La revenante (Short)
- 1960: Les portes claquent (co-réalisé avec Michel Fermaud)
- 1961: Les Amours de Paris
- 1962: Les Parisiennes (pour le sketch : Ella)
- 1963: Strip Tease (Sweet Skin, 1965 U.S. release title)
- 1963: L'Inconnue de Hong Kong
- 1964: Du grabuge chez les veuves
- 1964: Une souris chez les hommes (or Un drôle de caïd)
- 1965: La Tête du client
- 1966: Four Queens for an Ace (French title: Carré de dames pour un as)
- 1967: Le Canard en fer blanc
- 1968: Ce sacré grand-père (English title: The Marriage Came Tumbling Down)
- 1969: Qu'est-ce qui fait courir les crocodiles?
- 1971: Mendiants et orgueilleux (according to the novel of Albert Cossery)

== Actor ==
In cinema

- 1981: Birgitt Haas Must Be Killed (of Laurent Heynemann)
- 1982: Qu'est-ce qu'on attend pour être heureux! (of Coline Serreau) - Le directeur de production
- 1984: Un dimanche à la campagne (of Bertrand Tavernier) - Hector
- 1985: Trois hommes et un couffin (of Coline Serreau) - Le premier flic
- 1985: Cinématon n° 619 (of Gérard Courant)
- 1986: Autour de minuit (Round Midnight) (of Bertrand Tavernier)
- 1987: Les mois d'avril sont meurtriers (of Laurent Heynemann) - Le patron du bistrot
- 1989: Romuald et Juliette (of Coline Serreau) - Fonctionnaire 1
- 1996: La Belle Verte (of Coline Serreau) - Un passant
- 2001: Chaos (of Coline Serreau) - Le collègue de Paul #2 (final film role)

In TV

- 1990: Six Crimes sans assassins (of Bernard Stora) - Le commissaire du 12ème
