= List of films shown at the New York Film Festival =

This is a list of feature-length films (at least 45 minutes) shown at the New York Film Festival. Films previously released in the U.S. and screened as retrospectives are not included.

== Films at the first New York Film Festival (1963) ==
- Opening Night: The Exterminating Angel (Luis Buñuel, Mexico)
- Closing Night: Sweet and Sour (Jacques Baratier, France)
- All the Way Home (Alex Segal, USA)
- An Autumn Afternoon (Yasujirō Ozu, Japan)
- Barravento (Glauber Rocha, Brazil)
- Elektra at Epidaurus (Ted Zarpas, Greece)
- The Fiances (Ermanno Olmi, Italy)
- Glory Sky (Takis Kanellopoulos, Greece)
- In the Midst of Life (Robert Enrico, France)
- Hallelujah the Hills (Adolfas Mekas, USA)
- Harakiri (Masaki Kobayashi, Japan)
- Knife in the Water (Roman Polanski, Poland)
- Le Joli Mai (Chris Marker, France)
- Love in the Suburbs (Tamás Fejér, Hungary)
- Magnet of Doom (Jean-Pierre Melville, France)
- Muriel, or The Time of Return (Alain Resnais, France)
- RoGoPaG (Roberto Rossellini, Ugo Gregoretti, Jean-Luc Godard and Pier Paolo Pasolini, Italy)
- The Sea (Giuseppe Patroni Griffi, Italy)
- The Servant (Joseph Losey, UK)
- The Terrace (Leopoldo Torre Nilsson, Argentina)
- The Trial of Joan of Arc (Robert Bresson, France)

== Films at the second New York Film Festival (1964) ==
- Opening Night: Hamlet (Grigori Kozintsev, USSR)
- Closing Night: The Big City (Satyajit Ray, India)
- Alone Across the Pacific (Kon Ichikawa, Japan)
- Band of Outsiders (Jean-Luc Godard, France)
- Before the Revolution (Bernardo Bertolucci, Italy)
- The Brig (Jonas Mekas & Adolfas Mekas, USA)
- Cyrano et d'Artagnan (Abel Gance, France)
- Diary of a Chambermaid (Luis Buñuel, France)
- Enjō (Kon Ichikawa, Japan)
- Fail-Safe (Sidney Lumet, USA)
- Hands Over the City (Francesco Rosi, Italy)
- The Inheritance (Ricardo Alventosa, Argentina)
- King & Country (Joseph Losey, UK)
- Life Upside Down (Alain Jessua, France)
- Lilith (Robert Rossen, USA)
- Nobody Waved Good-bye (Don Owen, Canada)
- Nothing but a Man (Michael Roemer, USA)
- Passenger (Andrzej Munk, Poland)
- Salvatore Giuliano (Francesco Rosi, Italy)
- She and He (Susumu Hani, Japan)
- Siberian Lady Macbeth (Andrzej Wajda, Poland/Yugoslavia)
- Tales of the Taira Clan (Kenji Mizoguchi, Japan)
- To Love (Jörn Donner, Sweden)
- Woman in the Dunes (Hiroshi Teshigahara, Japan)
- A Woman Is a Woman (Jean-Luc Godard, France/Italy, 1961)

== Films at the 3rd New York Film Festival (1965) ==
- Opening Night: Alphaville (Jean-Luc Godard, France)
- Closing Night: Red Beard (Akira Kurosawa, Japan)
- Black Peter (Miloš Forman, Czechoslovakia)
- Charulata (Satyajit Ray, India)
- Fists in the Pocket (Marco Bellocchio, Italy)
- Gertrud (Carl Theodor Dreyer, Denmark)
- Identification Marks: None (Jerzy Skolimowski, Poland)
- The Koumiko Mystery (Chris Marker, France)
- Mickey One (Arthur Penn, USA)
- Not Reconciled (Jean-Marie Straub, West Germany)
- Paris vu par... (Claude Chabrol, Jean Douchet, Jean-Luc Godard, Jean-Daniel Pollet, Eric Rohmer and Jean Rouch, France)
- Le Petit soldat (Jean-Luc Godard, France)
- Raven's End (Bo Widerberg, Sweden)
- Sandra (Luchino Visconti, Italy)
- Shakespeare Wallah (James Ivory, India)
- The Shop on Main Street (Ján Kadár & Elmar Klos, Czechoslovakia)
- Sweet Substitute (Larry Kent, Canada)
- Thomas the Impostor (Georges Franju, France)
- Walkover (Jerzy Skolimowski, Poland)

== Films at the 4th New York Film Festival (1966) ==
- Opening Night: Loves of a Blonde (Miloš Forman, Czechoslovakia)
- Closing Night: La guerre est finie (Alain Resnais, France)
- Accattone (Pier Paolo Pasolini, Italy)
- Almost a Man (Vittorio De Seta, Italy)
- Au hasard Balthazar (Robert Bresson, France)
- Les Créatures (Agnès Varda, France)
- Do You Keep a Lion at Home? (Pavel Hobl, Czechoslovakia)
- The Eavesdropper (Leopoldo Torre Nilsson, Argentina)
- The Grim Reaper (Bernardo Bertolucci, Italy)
- The Hawks and the Sparrows (Pier Paolo Pasolini, Italy)
- Hunger (Henning Carlsen, Denmark)
- The Hunt (Carlos Saura, Spain)
- Intimate Lighting (Ivan Passer, Czechoslovakia)
- The Man Who Had His Hair Cut Short (André Delvaux, Belgium)
- Masculin Féminin (Jean-Luc Godard, France)
- Pearls of the Deep (Jirí Menzel, Jan Nemec, Evald Schorm, Vera Chytilová and Jaromil Jires, Czechoslovakia)
- Pierrot le Fou (Jean-Luc Godard, France)
- The Round-Up (Miklós Jancsó, Hungary)
- Shadows of Forgotten Ancestors (Sergei Parajanov, USSR)
- The Shameless Old Lady (René Allio, France)
- Simon of the Desert (Luis Buñuel, Mexico)
- Three (Aleksandar Petrovic, Yugoslavia)
- Troublemakers (Norman Fruchter & Robert Machover, USA)
- The War Game (Peter Watkins, UK)

== Films at the 5th New York Film Festival (1967) ==
- Opening Night: The Battle of Algiers (Gillo Pontecorvo, Italy/Algeria)
- Closing Night: Far from Vietnam (Jean-Luc Godard, Joris Ivens, William Klein, Claude Lelouch, Chris Marker, Alain Resnais, and Agnès Varda, France)
- Barrier (Jerzy Skolimowski, Poland)
- Benefit of the Doubt (Peter Whitehead, UK)
- Les Carabiniers (Jean-Luc Godard, France)
- Le Départ (Jerzy Skolimowski, Belgium)
- Elvira Madigan (Bo Widerberg, Sweden)
- Father (István Szabó, Hungary)
- The Feverish Years (Dragoslav Lazic, Yugoslavia)
- Funnyman (John Korty, USA)
- Hugs and Kisses (Jonas Cornell, Sweden)
- The Lion Hunters (Jean Rouch, France)
- Love Affair, or The Case of the Missing Switchboard Operator (Dusan Makavejev, Yugoslavia)
- Made in U.S.A. (Jean-Luc Godard, France)
- Memorandum (Donald Brittain & John Spotton, Canada)
- A Mother's Heart (Mark Donskoy, USSR)
- Portrait of Jason (Shirley Clarke, USA)
- Samurai Rebellion (Masaki Kobayashi, Japan)
- The Taking of Power by Louis XIV (Roberto Rossellini, France)
- Tonite Let's All Make Love in London (Peter Whitehead, UK)
- L'Une et l'Autre (René Allio, France)
- Yesterday Girl (Alexander Kluge, West Germany)
- Young Törless (Volker Schlöndorff, West Germany)

== Films at the 6th New York Film Festival (1968) ==
- Opening Night: Capricious Summer (Jirí Menzel, Czechoslovakia)
- Closing Night: The Firemen's Ball (Miloš Forman, Czechoslovakia)
- Artists Under the Big Top: Perplexed (Alexander Kluge, West Germany)
- Beyond the Law (Norman Mailer, USA)
- Les Biches (Claude Chabrol, France)
- The Chronicle of Anna Magdalena Bach (Jean-Marie Straub & Danièle Huillet, Italy/West Germany)
- Faces (John Cassavetes, USA)
- Hugo and Josephine (Kjell Grede, Sweden)
- The Immortal Story (Orson Welles, France)
- Kaya, I'll Kill You (Vatroslav Mimica, Yugoslavia)
- Mouchette (Robert Bresson, France)
- Naked Childhood (Maurice Pialat, France)
- The Nun (Jacques Rivette, France)
- Partner. (Bernardo Bertolucci, Italy)
- The Red and the White (Miklós Jancsó, Hungary)
- A Report on the Party and the Guests (Jan Nemec, Czechoslovakia)
- Signs of Life (Werner Herzog, West Germany)
- Tropics (Gianni Amico, Italy)
- 24 Hours in the Life of a Woman (Dominique Delouche, France)
- Two or Three Things I Know About Her (Jean-Luc Godard, France)
- Week End (Jean-Luc Godard, France)

== Films at the 7th New York Film Festival (1969) ==
- Opening Night: Bob & Carol & Ted & Alice (Paul Mazursky, USA)
- Closing Night: Oh! What a Lovely War (Richard Attenborough, UK)
- Ådalen 31 (Bo Widerberg, Sweden)
- Boy (Nagisa Oshima, Japan)
- Charles Lloyd: Journey Within (Eric Sherman, USA)
- The Deserter and the Nomads (Juraj Jakubisko, Czechoslovakia)
- Destroy, She Said (Marguerite Duras, France)
- Duet For Cannibals (Susan Sontag, Sweden)
- The Epic That Never Was (Bill Duncalf, UK)
- Feast of Friends (Paul Ferrara, USA)
- Une femme douce (Robert Bresson, France)
- Le Gai Savoir (Jean-Luc Godard, France)
- Goto, Island of Love (Walerian Borowczyk, France)
- Herostratus (Don Levy, Great Britain)
- High School (Frederick Wiseman, USA)
- The Joke (Jaromil Jireš, Czechoslovakia)
- The Lady from Constantinople (Judit Elek, Hungary)
- Lions Love (Agnès Varda, USA)
- The Money Order (Ousmane Sembène, Senegal)
- My Girfriend's Wedding (Jim McBride, USA)
- My Night at Maud's (Éric Rohmer, France)
- One Fine Day (Ermanno Olmi, Italy)
- Pierre & Paul (René Allio, France)
- Porcile (Pier Paolo Pasolini, Italy)
- The Rite (Ingmar Bergman, Sweden)

== Films at the 8th New York Film Festival (1970) ==
- Opening Night: The Wild Child (François Truffaut, France)
- Closing Night: Tristana (Luis Buñuel, Italy/France/Spain)
- Bleu Shut (Robert Nelson, USA)
- Le Boucher (Claude Chabrol, France)
- The Year of the Cannibals (Liliana Cavani, Italy)
- Comrades (Marin Karmitz, France)
- The Conformist (Bernardo Bertolucci, Italy)
- Days and Nights in the Forest (Satyajit Ray, India)
- Double Pisces (Dick Fontaine, UK)
- Even Dwarfs Started Small (Werner Herzog, West Germany)
- Five Easy Pieces (Bob Rafelson, USA)
- From Lumière to Langlois: The French Silent Cinema (Henri Langlois, France)
- The Garden of Delights (Carlos Saura, Spain)
- Harry Munter (Kjell Grede, Sweden)
- The Inheritors (Carlos Diegues, Brazil)
- Je t'aime, je t'aime (Alain Resnais, France)
- Kes (Ken Loach, UK)
- Langlois (Elia Hershon & Roberto Guerra)
- Mistreatment (Lars Lennart Forsberg, Sweden)
- La Musica (Marguerite Duras, France)
- Original Cast Album: Company (D. A. Pennebaker, USA)
- Othon (Jean-Marie Straub & Danièle Huillet, West Germany)
- Praise Marx and Pass the Ammunition (Maurice Hatton, UK)
- The Scavengers (Ermanno Olmi, Italy)
- Une simple histoire (Marcel Hanoun, France)
- The Spider's Stratagem (Bernardo Bertolucci, Italy)
- Street Scenes 1970 (Martin Scorsese, USA)
- Wind from the East (Dziga Vertov Group, Italy/France/West Germany)
- Zorns Lemma (Hollis Frampton, USA)

== Film at the 9th New York Film Festival (1971) ==
- Opening Night: The Beginning (Gleb Panfilov, USSR)
- Closing Night: Murmur of the Heart (Louis Malle, France)
- Bonaparte and the Revolution (Abel Gance, France)
- Born to Win (Ivan Passer, USA)
- The Decameron (Pier Paolo Pasolini, Italy)
- Directed by John Ford (Peter Bogdanovich, USA)
- Dodes'ka-den (Akira Kurosawa, Japan)
- Family Life (Krzysztof Zanussi, Poland)
- Fata Morgana (Werner Herzog, West Germany)
- Four Nights of a Dreamer (Robert Bresson, France)
- In the Name of the Father (Marco Bellocchio, Italy)
- In the Summertime (Ermanno Olmi, Italy)
- The Last Picture Show (Peter Bogdanovich, USA)
- Pioneers in Ingolstadt (Rainer Werner Fassbinder, West Germany)
- Punishment Park (Peter Watkins, USA)
- A Safe Place (Henry Jaglom, USA)
- The Sorrow and the Pity (Marcel Ophuls, France)
- W.R.: Mysteries of the Organism (Dusan Makavejev, Yugoslavia)

== Films at the 10th New York Film Festival (1972) ==
- Opening Night: Chloe in the Afternoon (Éric Rohmer, France)
- Closing Night: Last Tango in Paris (Bernardo Bertolucci, Italy/France)
- The Adversary (Satyajit Ray, India)
- L'amour fou (Jacques Rivette, France)
- The Assassination of Trotsky (Joseph Losey, Italy/France)
- Bad Company (Robert Benton, USA)
- Behind the Wall (Krzysztof Zanussi, Poland)
- The Discreet Charm of the Bourgeoisie (Luis Buñuel, France)
- Family Life (Ken Loach, UK)
- Going Home (Adolfas Mekas, USA)
- Heat (Paul Morrissey, USA)
- Images (Robert Altman, Ireland)
- The Inner Scar (Philippe Garrel, France)
- The King of Marvin Gardens (Bob Rafelson, USA)
- Letter to Jane (Jean-Luc Godard & Jean-Pierre Gorin, France)
- Love (Károly Makk, Hungary)
- The Merchant of Four Seasons (Rainer Werner Fassbinder, West Germany)
- Nathalie Granger (Marguerite Duras, France)
- Red Psalm (Miklós Jancsó, Hungary)
- Reminiscences of a Journey to Lithuania (Jonas Mekas, USA)
- A Sense of Loss (Marcel Ophüls, Switzerland/USA)
- Summer Soldiers (Hiroshi Teshigahara, Japan)
- Tout va bien (Jean-Luc Godard & Jean-Pierre Gorin, France)
- Two English Girls (François Truffaut, France)
- We Won't Grow Old Together (Maurice Pialat, France/Italy)

== Films at the 11th New York Film Festival (1973) ==
- Opening Night: Day for Night (François Truffaut, France)
- Closing Night: Badlands (Terrence Malick, USA)
- Andrei Rublev (Andrei Tarkovsky, USSR)
- The Bitter Tears of Petra von Kant (Rainer Werner Fassbinder, West Germany)
- Distant Thunder (Satyajit Ray, India)
- A Doll's House (Joseph Losey, UK)
- History Lessons (Jean-Marie Straub & Danièle Huillet, West Germany/Italy)
- The Illumination (Krzysztof Zanussi, Poland)
- Israel, Why? (Claude Lanzmann, France)
- Just Before Nightfall (Claude Chabrol, France)
- Kid Blue (James Frawley, USA)
- Land of Silence and Darkness (Werner Herzog, West Germany)
- Mean Streets (Martin Scorsese, USA)
- The Mother and the Whore (Jean Eustache, France)
- Réjeanne Padovani (Denys Arcand, Canada)
- Return (Gianni Amico, Italy)
- La Rupture (Claude Chabrol, France)

== Films at the 12th New York Film Festival (1974) ==
- Opening Night: Don't Cry With Your Mouth Full (Pascal Thomas, France)
- Closing Night: The Phantom of Liberty (Luis Buñuel, France)
- Ali: Fear Eats the Soul (Rainer Werner Fassbinder, West Germany)
- Alice in the Cities (Wim Wenders, West Germany)
- The Bench of Desolation (Claude Chabrol, France)
- A Bigger Splash (Jack Hazan, UK)
- Celine and Julie Go Boating (Jacques Rivette, France)
- The Circumstance (Ermanno Olmi, Italy)
- From These Roots (Bill Greaves, USA)
- Italianamerican (Martin Scorsese, USA)
- Lacombe, Lucien (Louis Malle, France)
- Lancelot du Lac (Robert Bresson, France)
- The Middle of the World (Alain Tanner, Switzerland)
- The Night of the Scarecrow (Sérgio Ricardo, Brazil)
- Old-Fashioned Woman (Martha Coolidge, USA)
- Out 1: Spectre (Jacques Rivette, France)
- La Paloma (Daniel Schmid, Switzerland)
- Part-Time Work of a Domestic Slave (Alexander Kluge, West Germany)
- Rome Wants Another Caesar (Miklós Jancsó, Hungary)
- Stavisky (Alain Resnais, France)
- A Woman Under the Influence (John Cassavetes, USA)
- Yudie (Mirra Bank, USA)

== Films at the 13th New York Film Festival (1975) ==
- Opening Night: Conversation Piece (Luchino Visconti, Italy)
- Closing Night: The Story of Adele H. (François Truffaut, France)
- Autobiography of a Princess (James Ivory, UK)
- Black Moon (Louis Malle, France)
- Compañero: Victor Jara of Chile (Stanley Forman & Martin Smith, Chile)
- Electra, My Love (Miklós Jancsó, Hungary)
- The Enigma of Kaspar Hauser (Werner Herzog, West Germany)
- Exhibition (Jean-François Davy, France)
- F for Fake (Orson Welles, France)
- Fox and His Friends (Rainer Werner Fassbinder, West Germany)
- French Provincial (André Téchiné, France)
- Grey Gardens (Albert Maysles & David Mayles & Ellen Hovde & Muffie Meyer, USA)
- Hearts of the West (Howard Zieff, USA)
- India Song (Marguerite Duras, France)
- The Lost Honour of Katharina Blum (Volker Schlöndorff & Margarethe von Trotta, West Germany)
- Milestones (Robert Kramer & John Douglas, USA)
- Moses and Aaron (Jean-Marie Straub & Danièle Huillet, West Germany/France/Italy)
- Smile (Michael Ritchie, USA)
- The Wonderful Crook (Claude Goretta, Switzerland)
- Xala (Ousmane Sembène, Senegal)

== Films at the 14th New York Film Festival (1976) ==
- Opening Night: Small Change (François Truffaut, France)
- Closing Night: The Marquise of O (Eric Rohmer, West Germany/France)
- Bernice Bobs Her Hair (Joan Micklin Silver, USA)
- Dersu Uzala (Akira Kurosawa, USSR/Japan)
- Duelle (Jacques Rivette, France)
- Fear of Fear (Rainer Werner Fassbinder, West Germany)
- Harlan County, USA (Barbara Kopple, USA)
- Illustrious Corpses (Francesco Rosi, Italy)
- Jonah Who Will Be 25 in the Year 2000 (Alain Tanner, Switzerland)
- Kings of the Road (Wim Wenders, West Germany)
- The Memory of Justice (Marcel Ophuls, USA)
- The Middleman (Satyajit Ray, India)
- Sérail (Eduardo de Gregorio, France)
- The Story of Sin (Walerian Borowczyk, Poland)
- Strongman Ferdinand (Alexander Kluge, West Germany)
- A Touch of Zen (King Hu, Hong Kong)

== Films at the 15th New York Film Festival (1977) ==
- Opening Night: One Sings, the Other Doesn't (Agnès Varda, France)
- Closing Night: That Obscure Object of Desire (Luis Buñuel, France/Spain)
- The American Friend (Wim Wenders, West Germany)
- Le Camion (Marguerite Duras, France)
- Children of Labor (Noel Buckner & Mary Dore & Richard Boardman & Al Gedicks, USA)
- Citizens Band (Jonathan Demme, USA)
- The Devil, Probably (Robert Bresson, France)
- Heart of Glass (Werner Herzog, West Germany)
- Hot Tomorrows (Martin Brest, USA)
- The Lacemaker (Claude Goretta, France)
- The Man Who Loved Women (François Truffaut, France)
- Men of Bronze (Bill Miles, USA)
- 1900 (Bernardo Bertolucci, Italy)
- Omar Gatlato (Merzak Allouache, Algeria)
- Padre Padrone (Paolo and Vittorio Taviani, Italy)
- Pafnucio Santo (Rafael Corkidi, Mexico)
- Roseland (James Ivory, USA)
- Salò, or The 120 Days of Sodom (Pier Paolo Pasolini, Italy)
- Short Eyes (Robert M. Young, USA)
- Tent of Miracles (Nelson Pereira dos Santos, Brazil)
- Women (Márta Mészáros, Hungary)

== Films at the 16th New York Film Festival (1978) ==
- Opening Night: A Wedding (Robert Altman, USA)
- Closing Night: Violette (Claude Chabrol, France)
- American Boy: A Profile of Steven Prince (Martin Scorsese, USA)
- The Apple Game (Vera Chytilová, Czechoslovakia)
- Bloodbrothers (Robert Mulligan, USA)
- Camouflage (Krzysztof Zanussi, Poland)
- The CIA Case Officer (Saul Landau, USA)
- Despair (Rainer Werner Fassbinder, West Germany)
- Dossier 51 (Michel Deville, France)
- Elective Affinities (Gianni Amico, Italy)
- Gates of Heaven (Errol Morris, USA)
- Get Out Your Handkerchiefs (Bertrand Blier, France)
- The Green Room (François Truffaut, France)
- The Left-Handed Woman (Peter Handke, West Germany)
- Like a Turtle on Its Back (Luc Béraud, France)
- Manimals (Robin Lehman, USA)
- The Miracle of the Wolves (1924) (Raymond Bernard, France)
- Movies Are My Life (Peter Hayden, USA)
- Newsfront (Phillip Noyce, Australia)
- Perceval le Gallois (Eric Rohmer, France)
- The Shout (Jerzy Skolimowski, Poland)
- Skip Tracer (Zale Dalen, Canada)
- Spies (1928) (Fritz Lang, Germany)
- They Are Their Own Gifts (Lucille Rhodes & Margaret Murphy, USA)
- With Babies and Banners: Story of the Women's Emergency Brigade (Lorraine Gray, USA)

== Films at the 17th New York Film Festival (1979) ==
- Opening Night: Luna (Bernardo Bertolucci, Italy/USA)
- Closing Night: The Marriage of Maria Braun (Rainer Werner Fassbinder, West Germany)
- Alexandria... Why? (Youssef Chahine, Egypt/Algeria)
- Angi Vera (Pál Gábor, Hungary)
- Best Boy (Ira Wohl, USA)
- Black Jack (Ken Loach, UK)
- The Black Stallion (Carroll Ballard, USA)
- The Bugs Bunny/Road Runner Movie, (Chuck Jones, USA)
- The Europeans (James Ivory, UK)
- In a Year of Thirteen Moons (Rainer Werner Fassbinder, West Germany)
- The Maids of Wilko (Andrzej Wajda, Poland)
- Molière (Ariane Mnouchkine, France)
- My Brilliant Career (Gillian Armstrong, Australia)
- Nosferatu the Vampyre (Werner Herzog, West Germany)
- Other People's Money (Christian de Chalonge, France)
- A Scream from Silence (Anne Claire Poirier, Canada)
- Short Memory (Eduardo de Gregorio, France)
- Wise Blood (John Huston, USA)
- Without Anesthesia (Andrzej Wajda, Poland)
- The Wobblies (Stewart Bird & Deborah Shaffer, USA)

== Films at the 18th New York Film Festival (1980) ==
- Opening Night: Melvin and Howard (Jonathan Demme, USA)
- Closing Night: The Last Metro (François Truffaut, France)
- And Quiet Rolls the Dawn (Mrinal Sen, India)
- Bye Bye Brazil (Carlos Diegues, Brazil)
- Camera Buff (Krzysztof Kieslowski, Poland)
- The Color of Pomegranates (Sergei Parajanov, Armenia)
- Confidence (István Szabó, Hungary)
- The Constant Factor (Krzysztof Zanussi, Poland)
- Every Man for Himself (Jean-Luc Godard, France/Switzerland)
- Handicapped Love (Marlies Graf, Switzerland)
- The Handyman (Micheline Lanctôt, Canada)
- Here's Looking at You, Kid (William Edgar Cohen, USA)
- Kagemusha (Akira Kurosawa, Japan)
- The Life and Times of Rosie the Riveter (Connie Field, USA)
- Loulou (Maurice Pialat, France)
- Masoch (Franco Brogi Taviani, Italy)
- Nights at O'Rear's (Robert Mandel, USA)
- The Orchestra Conductor (Andrzej Wajda, Poland)
- Rush (Evelyn Purcell, USA)
- Special Treatment (Goran Paskaljevic, Yugoslavia)
- Sunday Daughters (János Rózsa, Hungary)

== Films at the 19th New York Film Festival (1981) ==
- Opening Night: Chariots of Fire (Hugh Hudson, UK)
- Closing Night: Man of Iron (Andrzej Wajda, Poland)
- The Aviator's Wife (Éric Rohmer, France)
- The Beads of One Rosary (Kazimierz Kutz, Poland)
- Beau-père (Bertrand Blier, France)
- Contract (Krzysztof Zanussi, Poland)
- Documenteur (Agnès Varda, USA)
- Fit to Be Untied (Silvano Agosti & Marco Bellocchio & Sandro Petraglia & Stefano Rulli, Italy)
- Graduate First (Maurice Pialat, France)
- Hopper's Silence (Brian O'Doherty, USA)
- The Last to Know (Bonnie Friedman, USA)
- Lightning Over Water (Wim Wenders & Nicholas Ray, West Germany)
- Looks and Smiles (Ken Loach, UK)
- Mephisto (István Szabó, Hungary)
- Mur Murs (Agnès Varda, USA)
- The Mystery of Oberwald (Michelangelo Antonioni, Italy)
- My Dinner with Andre (Louis Malle, USA)
- Passion of Love (Ettore Scola, Italy)
- Le Pont du Nord (Jacques Rivette, France)
- Resurgence: The Movement for Equality vs. the Ku Klux Klan (Pamela Yates & Tom Sigel, USA)
- Soldier Girls (Nick Broomfield & Joan Churchill, USA)
- Stations of the Elevated (Manfred Kirchheimer, USA)
- Taxi zum Klo (Frank Ripploh, West Germany)
- Tighten Your Belts, Bite the Bullet (James Gaffney & Martin Lucas & Jonathan Miller, USA)
- Trances (Ahmed El Maanouni, Morocco)
- Vernon, Florida (Errol Morris, USA)
- We Were German Jews (Michael Blackwood, West Germany)
- The Witness (Péter Bacsó, Hungary)
- The Woman Next Door (François Truffaut, France)

== Films at the 20th New York Film Festival (1982) ==
- Opening Night: Veronika Voss (Rainer Werner Fassbinder, West Germany)
- Closing Night: Fitzcarraldo (Werner Herzog, West Germany)
- Another Way (Károly Makk, Hungary)
- Before the Nickelodeon: The Early Cinema of Edwin S. Porter (Charles Musser, USA)
- City Lovers (Barney Simon, South Africa)
- Coming of Age (Josh Hanig, USA)
- Dark Circle (Judy Irving & Chris Beaver, USA)
- The Draughtsman's Contract (Peter Greenaway, UK)
- Eating Raoul (Paul Bartel, USA)
- Identification of a Woman (Michelangelo Antonioni, Italy)
- Koyaanisqatsi (Godfrey Reggio, USA)
- Little People (Jan Krawitz & Thomas Ott, USA)
- Little Wars (Maroun Bagdadi, Lebanon)
- Moonlighting (Jerzy Skolimowski, UK)
- The Night of the Shooting Stars (Paolo and Vittorio Taviani, Italy)
- One Man's War (Edgardo Cozarinsky, France)
- Say Amen, Somebody (George T. Nierenberg, USA)
- The Stationmaster's Wife (Rainer Werner Fassbinder, West Germany)
- Tex (Tim Hunter, USA)
- Time Stands Still (Péter Gothár, Hungary)
- The Trout (Joseph Losey, France)
- The Tyrant's Heart (Miklós Jancsó, Hungary)
- Vortex (Scott B and Beth B, USA)
- Yol (Serif Gören & Yilmaz Güney, Turkey)

== Films at the 21st New York Film Festival (1983) ==
- Opening Night: The Big Chill (Lawrence Kasdan, USA)
- Closing Night: Streamers (Robert Altman, USA)
- L'Argent (Robert Bresson, France)
- Boat People (Ann Hui, Hong Kong)
- Burroughs: The Movie (Howard Brookner, USA)
- Danton (Andrzej Wajda, France/Poland)
- Dhrupad (Mani Kaul, India)
- The Eighties (Chantal Akerman, Belgium)
- Entre Nous (Diane Kurys, France)
- Eréndira (Ruy Guerra, Mexico)
- Forbidden Relations (Zsolt Kézdi-Kovács, Hungary)
- Heart Like a Wheel (Jonathan Kaplan, USA)
- In the White City (Alain Tanner, Portugal/Switzerland)
- Last Night at the Alamo (Eagle Pennell, USA)
- Life Is a Bed of Roses (Alain Resnais, France)
- Lost Illusions (Gyula Gazdag, Hungary)
- Nostalghia (Andrei Tarkovsky, Italy)
- Passion (Jean-Luc Godard, France/Germany)
- Red Love (Rosa von Praunheim, West Germany)
- Rumble Fish (Francis Ford Coppola, USA)
- Seeing Red (James Klein & Julia Reichert, USA)
- So Far From India (Mira Nair, India/USA)
- The Story of Piera (Marco Ferreri, Italy)
- Vietnam: The Secret Agent (Jacki Ochs, USA)
- The Wind (Souleymane Cissé, Mali)

== Films at the 22nd New York Film Festival (1984) ==
- Opening Night: Country (Richard Pearce, USA)
- Closing Night: Paris, Texas (Wim Wenders, West Germany)
- À nos amours (Maurice Pialat, France)
- America and Lewis Hine (Nina Rosenblum, USA)
- Blood Simple (Joel Coen, USA)
- Cammina Cammina (Ermanno Olmi, Italy)
- Class Relations (Jean-Marie Straub & Danièle Huillet, West Germany/France)
- Diary for My Children (Márta Mészáros, Hungary)
- A Flash of Green (Victor Nuñez, USA)
- A Hill on the Dark Side of the Moon (Lennart Hjulström, Sweden)
- The Holy Innocents (Mario Camus, Spain)
- A Love in Germany (Andrzej Wajda, West Germany)
- Love on the Ground (Jacques Rivette, France)
- Man of Flowers (Paul Cox, Australia)
- Memoirs of Prison (Nelson Pereira dos Santos, Brazil)
- Once Upon a Time in America (Sergio Leone, USA)
- Shivers (Wojciech Marczewski, Poland)
- Stranger Than Paradise (Jim Jarmusch, USA)
- Strikebound (Richard Lowenstein, Australia)
- A Sunday in the Country (Bertrand Tavernier, France)
- Los Sures (Diego Echeverria, USA)
- Three Crowns of the Sailor (Raúl Ruiz, France)
- The Times of Harvey Milk (Rob Epstein, USA)

== Films at the 23rd New York Film Festival (1985) ==
- Opening Night: Ran (Akira Kurosawa, Japan)
- Closing Night: Kaos (Paolo and Vittorio Taviani, Italy)
- Angry Harvest (Agnieszka Holland, West Germany)
- Bliss (Ray Lawrence, Australia)
- Boy Meets Girl (Leos Carax, France)
- Chain Letters (Mark Rappaport, USA)
- City of Pirates (Raúl Ruiz, Portugal)
- Colonel Redl (István Szabó, Hungary)
- Destroyed Time (Pierre Beuchot, France)
- Himatsuri (Mitsuo Yanagimachi, Japan)
- Hail Mary (Jean-Luc Godard, France)
- Harvest of Despair (Slavko Nowytski, Canada)
- Huey Long (Ken Burns, USA)
- Jean Cocteau: Self-Portrait of a Man Unknown (Edgardo Cozarinsky, France)
- No Man's Land (Alain Tanner, Switzerland)
- Oriana (Fina Torres, Venezuela)
- Private Conversations (Christian Blackwood, USA)
- The Satin Slipper (Manoel de Oliveira, Portugal)
- Steaming (Joseph Losey, UK)
- Sugarbaby (Percy Adlon, West Germany)
- 28 Up (Michael Apted, UK)
- When Father Was Away on Business (Emir Kusturica, Yugoslavia)
- A Year of the Quiet Sun (Krzysztof Zanussi, Poland)

== Films at the 24th New York Film Festival (1986) ==
- Opening Night: Down by Law (Jim Jarmusch, USA)
- Closing Night: Peggy Sue Got Married (Francis Ford Coppola, USA)
- The Blind Director (Alexander Kluge, West Germany)
- Cactus (Paul Cox, Australia)
- Charlotte and Lulu (Claude Miller, France)
- Dancing in the Dark (Leon Marr, Canada)
- The Decline of the American Empire (Denys Arcand, Canada)
- Directed by William Wyler (Aviva Slesin, USA)
- Isaac in America: A Journey with Isaac Bashevis Singer (Amram Nowak, USA)
- Malandro (Ruy Guerra, Brazil)
- Marlene (Maximilian Schell, West Germany)
- Ménage (Bertrand Blier, France)
- No End (Krzysztof Kieslowski, Poland)
- Police (Maurice Pialat, France)
- Round Midnight (Bertrand Tavernier, USA)
- The Sacrifice (Andrei Tarkovsky, Sweden)
- Scene of the Crime (André Téchiné, France)
- Sid and Nancy (Alex Cox, UK)
- Thérèse (Alain Cavalier, France)
- A Time to Live and a Time to Die (Hou Hsiao-hsien, Taiwan)
- To Sleep so as to Dream (Kaizo Hayashi, Japan)
- True Stories (David Byrne, USA)
- A Zed & Two Noughts (Peter Greenaway, UK)

== Films at the 25th New York Film Festival (1987) ==
- Opening Night: Dark Eyes (Nikita Mikhalkov, Italy)
- Closing Night: House of Games (David Mamet, USA)
- Anita: Dances of Vice (Rosa von Praunheim, West Germany)
- Anna (Yurek Bogayevicz, USA)
- Babette's Feast (Gabriel Axel, Denmark)
- Barfly (Barbet Schroeder, USA)
- The Belly of an Architect (Peter Greenaway, UK/Italy)
- Boyfriends and Girlfriends (Eric Rohmer, France)
- Diary for My Lovers (Márta Mészáros, Hungary)
- Fire From the Mountain (Deborah Shaffer, USA)
- Hail! Hail! Rock 'n' Roll (Taylor Hackford, USA)
- Hope and Glory (John Boorman, UK)
- Horowitz Plays Mozart (Albert Maysles & Susan Froemke & Charlotte Zwerin, USA)
- Mauvais sang (Leos Carax, France)
- Mélo (Alain Resnais, France)
- A Month in the Country (Pat O'Connor, UK)
- Police Story (Jackie Chan, Hong Kong)
- Radium City (Carole Langer, USA)
- A Taxing Woman (Juzo Itami, Japan)
- The Theme (Gleb Panfilov, USSR)
- Under the Sun of Satan (Maurice Pialat, France)
- Yeelen (Souleymane Cissé, Mali)

== Films at the 26th New York Film Festival (1988) ==
- Opening Night: Women on the Verge of a Nervous Breakdown (Pedro Almodóvar, Spain)
- Closing Night: Red Sorghum (Zhang Yimou, China)
- Ashik Kerib (Sergei Parajanov, USSR)
- Bird (Clint Eastwood, USA)
- Daughter of the Nile (Hou Hsiao-hsien, Taiwan)
- Distant Voices, Still Lives (Terence Davies, UK)
- Falkenau, the Impossible (Emil Weiss, France)
- Felix (Christel Buschmann/Helke Sander/Helma Sanders-Brahms/Margarethe von Trotta, Germany)
- Golub (Jerry Blumenthal & Gordon Quinn, USA)
- Hard Times (João Botelho, Portugal)
- High Hopes (Mike Leigh, UK)
- Hôtel Terminus: The Life and Times of Klaus Barbie (Marcel Ophuls, USA)
- Jacob (Mircea Daneliuc, Romania)
- The Last of England (Derek Jarman, UK)
- The Man with Three Coffins (Lee Jang-ho, South Korea)
- Mapantsula (Oliver Schmitz, South Africa)
- La maschera (Fiorella Infascelli, Italy)
- Opening Night (John Cassavetes, USA)
- Pelle the Conqueror (Bille August, Denmark)
- Salaam Bombay! (Mira Nair, India)
- 36 Fillette (Catherine Breillat, France)
- A Winter Tan (Jackie Burroughs & Louise Clark & John Frizzell & John Walker & Aerlyn Weissman, Canada)

== Films at the 27th New York Film Festival (1989) ==
- Opening Night: Too Beautiful for You (Bertrand Blier, France)
- Closing Night: Breaking In (Bill Forsyth, USA)
- Ariel (Aki Kaurismäki, Finland)
- Black Rain (Shohei Imamura, Japan)
- Book of Days (Meredith Monk, USA)
- A City of Sadness (Hou Hsiao-hsien, Taiwan)
- Confession: A Chronicle of Alienation (Georgiy Gavrilov, USSR)
- Current Events (Ralph Arlyck, USA)
- Dancing for Mr. B: Six Balanchine Ballerinas (Anne Belle & Deborah Dickson, USA)
- The Documentator (István Dárday & Györgyi Szalai, Hungary)
- Life and Nothing But (Bertrand Tavernier, France)
- The Mahabharata (Peter Brook, France/UK/USA)
- Monsieur Hire (Patrice Leconte, France)
- My Left Foot (Jim Sheridan, Ireland)
- Mystery Train (Jim Jarmusch, USA)
- Near Death (Frederick Wiseman, USA)
- The Plot Against Harry (Michael Roemer, USA)
- Roger & Me (Michael Moore, USA)
- A Short Film About Killing (Krzysztof Kieslowski, Poland)
- Speaking Parts (Atom Egoyan, Canada)
- Strapless (David Hare, UK)
- Sweetie (Jane Campion, New Zealand)
- A Tale of the Wind (Joris Ivens & Marceline Loridan, France)
- Thelonious Monk: Straight, No Chaser (Charlotte Zwerin, USA)
- Yaaba (Idrissa Ouedraogo, Burkina Faso)

== Films at the 28th New York Film Festival (1990) ==
- Opening Night: Miller's Crossing (Joel Coen, USA)
- Closing Night: The Nasty Girl (Michael Verhoeven, West Germany)
- American Dream (Barbara Kopple, USA)
- An Angel at My Table (Jane Campion, New Zealand)
- Doctor Petiot (Christian de Chalonge, France)
- Freeze Die Come to Life (Vitali Kanevsky, USSR)
- The Golden Boat (Raúl Ruiz, USA)
- Golden Braid (Paul Cox, Australia)
- I Hired a Contract Killer (Aki Kaurismäki, Finland)
- Ju Dou (Zhang Yimou, China)
- King of New York (Abel Ferrara, USA)
- Listen Up: The Lives of Quincy Jones (Ellen Weissbrod & Courtney Sale Ross, USA)
- The Match Factory Girl (Aki Kaurismäki, Finland)
- Night Sun (Paolo and Vittorio Taviani, Italy)
- No, or the Vain Glory of Command (Manoel de Oliveira, Portugal)
- Nouvelle Vague (Jean-Luc Godard, Switzerland/France)
- Open Doors (Gianni Amelio, Italy)
- Privilege (Yvonne Rainer, USA)
- Siddheshwari (Mani Kaul, India)
- The Sting of Death (Kohei Oguri, Japan)
- A Tale of Springtime (Eric Rohmer, France)
- Taxi Blues (Pavel Lungin, USSR)
- Tilaï (Idrissa Ouédraogo, Burkina Faso)
- To Sleep with Anger (Charles Burnett, USA)
- A Woman's Revenge (Jacques Doillon, France)

== Films at the 29th New York Film Festival (1991) ==
- Opening Night: The Double Life of Veronique (Krzysztof Kieslowski, France)
- Closing Night: Homicide (David Mamet, USA)
- Adam's Rib (Vyacheslav Krishtofovich, Russia)
- The Adjuster (Atom Egoyan, Canada)
- Amelia Lópes O'Neill (Valeria Sarmiento, Chile)
- Beauty and the Beast [work-in-progress] (Gary Trousdale & Kirk Wise, USA)
- La Belle Noiseuse (Jacques Rivette, France)
- Delicatessen (Jean-Pierre Jeunet & Marc Caro, France)
- Intimate Stranger (Alan Berliner, USA)
- Inventory (Krzysztof Zanussi, Poland)
- Jacquot de Nantes (Agnès Varda, France)
- Life on a String (Chen Kaige, China)
- Locked-Up Time (Sibylle Schönemann, Germany)
- My Own Private Idaho (Gus Van Sant, USA)
- Night on Earth (Jim Jarmusch, USA)
- No Life King (Jun Ichikawa, Japan)
- The Other Eye (Johanna Heer & Werner Schmiedel, Austria)
- Pictures From a Revolution (Susan Meiselas & Richard P. Rogers & Alfred Guzzetti, USA)
- Prospero's Books (Peter Greenaway, UK)
- The Rapture (Michael Tolkin, USA)
- The Suspended Step of the Stork (Theo Angelopoulos, Greece)
- Toto le héros (Jaco Van Dormael, Belgium)
- Woman of the Port (Arturo Ripstein, Mexico)
- Zombie and the Ghost Train (Mika Kaurismäki, Finland)

== Films at the 30th New York Film Festival (1992) ==
- Opening Night: Olivier, Olivier (Agnieszka Holland, France)
- Closing Night: Night and the City (Irwin Winkler, USA)
- Allah Tantou (David Achkar, Guinea/France)
- And Life Goes On (Abbas Kiarostami, Iran)
- Autumn Moon (Clara Law, Hong Kong)
- Benny's Video (Michael Haneke, Austria)
- Careful (Guy Maddin, Canada)
- The Crying Game (Neil Jordan, Ireland/UK)
- Delivered Vacant (Nora Jacobsen, USA)
- Dream of Light (Víctor Erice, Spain)
- Hyenas (Djibril Diop Mambéty, Senegal)
- Idiot (Mani Kaul, India)
- In the Soup (Alexandre Rockwell, USA)
- Léolo (Jean-Claude Lauzon, Canada)
- The Lovers on the Bridge (Leos Carax, France)
- Lumumba, Death of a Prophet (Raoul Peck, Germany/Switzerland)
- Man Bites Dog (Rémy Belvaux & André Bonzel & Benoît Poelvoorde, Belgium)
- The Oak (Lucian Pintilie, Romania)
- La Sentinelle (Arnaud Desplechin, France)
- Stone (Alexander Sokurov, Russia)
- The Story of Qiu Ju (Zhang Yimou, China)
- Strictly Ballroom (Baz Luhrmann, Australia)
- A Tale of Winter (Eric Rohmer, France)
- La Vie de bohème (Aki Kaurismäki, Finland)
- Zebrahead (Anthony Drazan, USA)

== Films at the 31st New York Film Festival (1993) ==
- Opening Night: Short Cuts (Robert Altman, USA)
- Closing Night: The Piano (Jane Campion, France/Australia)
- Aileen Wuornos: The Selling of a Serial Killer (Nick Broomfield, USA)
- Birthplace (Pawel Lozinski, Poland)
- Blue (Derek Jarman, UK)
- The Blue Kite (Tian Zhuangzhuang, China)
- Calendar (Atom Egoyan, Canada/Armenia)
- Farewell My Concubine (Chen Kaige, China)
- Fiorile (Paolo and Vittorio Taviani, Italy)
- It's All True: Based on an Unfinished Film by Orson Welles (Bill Krohn & Myron Miesel & Richard Wilson, Brazil/France/USA)
- Naked (Mike Leigh, UK)
- The Night (Mohammad Malas, Syria/Lebanon)
- The Nightmare Before Christmas (Henry Selick, USA)
- The Puppetmaster (Hou Hsiao-hsien, Taiwan)
- Raining Stones (Ken Loach, UK)
- Ruby in Paradise (Victor Nuñez, USA)
- The Scent of Green Papaya (Tran Anh Hung, Vietnam/France)
- Shades of Doubt (Aline Issermann, France)
- The Snapper (Stephen Frears, UK)
- Three Colours: Blue (Krzysztof Kieslowski, France)
- Totally F***ed Up (Gregg Araki, USA)
- Valley of Abraham (Manoel de Oliveira, Portugal)
- The War Room (D.A. Pennebaker & Chris Hegedus, USA)
- Wendemi (S. Pierre Yameogo, Burkina Faso)
- The Wonderful, Horrible Life of Leni Riefenstahl (Ray Müller, Germany/Belgium/UK)

== Films at the 32nd New York Film Festival (1994) ==
- Opening Night: Pulp Fiction (Quentin Tarantino, USA)
- Centerpiece: Bullets over Broadway (Woody Allen, USA)
- Closing Night: Hoop Dreams (Steve James, USA)
- Amateur (Hal Hartley, USA)
- Caro diario (Nanni Moretti, Italy)
- Chungking Express (Wong Kar-wai, Hong Kong)
- Cold Water (Olivier Assayas, France)
- A Confucian Confusion (Edward Yang, Taiwan)
- Crumb (Terry Zwigoff, USA)
- Ed Wood (Tim Burton, USA)
- Exotica (Atom Egoyan, Canada)
- Ladybird, Ladybird (Ken Loach, UK)
- Postcards From America (Steve McLean, USA)
- The Red Lotus Society (Stan Lai, Taiwan)
- Sátántangó (Béla Tarr, Hungary)
- See How They Fall (Jacques Audiard, France)
- The Silences of the Palace (Moufida Tlatli, Tunisia)
- Strawberry and Chocolate (Tomás Gutiérrez Alea & Juan Carlos Tabío, Cuba)
- Theremin: An Electronic Odyssey (Steven M. Martin, USA)
- Through the Olive Trees (Abbas Kiarostami, Iran)
- Three Colours: Red (Krzysztof Kieslowski, France)
- To Live (Zhang Yimou, China)
- To the Starry Island (Park Kwang-su, South Korea)
- The Troubles We've Seen (Marcel Ophuls, France)
- Wild Reeds (André Téchiné, France)

== Films at the 33rd New York Film Festival (1995) ==
- Opening Night: Shanghai Triad (Zhang Yimou, China)
- Centerpiece: Strange Days (Kathryn Bigelow, USA)
- Closing Night: Carrington (Christopher Hampton, UK)
- Augustin (Anne Fontaine, France)
- Beyond the Clouds (Michelangelo Antonioni, France/Italy/Germany)
- The Celluloid Closet (Rob Epstein and Jeffrey Friedman, USA)
- Cinema of Unease: A Personal Journey by Sam Neill (Sam Neill & Judy Rymer, New Zealand/UK)
- Citizen Langlois (Edgardo Cozarinsky, France)
- The Convent (Manoel de Oliveira, Portugal)
- Cyclo (Tran Anh Hung, France/Vietnam)
- Dead Presidents (Hughes brothers, USA)
- Flamenco (Carlos Saura, Spain)
- Flirt (Hal Hartley, USA)
- The Flower of My Secret (Pedro Almodóvar, Spain)
- Le Franc (Djibril Diop Mambéty, Senegal/Switzerland)
- From the Journals of Jean Seberg (Mark Rappaport, USA)
- The Gate of Heavenly Peace (Richard Gordon & Carma Hinton, USA)
- Georgia (Ulu Grosbard, USA)
- Good Men, Good Women (Hou Hsiao-hsien, Taiwan)
- Guimba the Tyrant (Cheick Oumar Sissoko, Mali/Burkina Faso)
- La Haine (Mathieu Kassovitz, France)
- Kicking and Screaming (Noah Baumbach, USA)
- Lamerica (Gianni Amelio, Italy/France)
- Land and Freedom (Ken Loach, UK)
- The Neon Bible (Terence Davies, UK)
- Sixteen-Oh-Sixty (Vinicius Mainardi, Brazil)
- The Son of Gascogne (Pascal Aubier, France)
- The White Balloon (Jafar Panahi, Iran)

== Films at the 34th New York Film Festival (1996) ==
- Opening Night: Secrets & Lies (Mike Leigh, UK)
- Centerpiece: Thieves (André Téchiné, France)
- Closing Night: The People vs. Larry Flynt (Miloš Forman, USA)
- Beyond the Clouds (Michelangelo Antonioni, France/Italy/Germany)
- Breaking the Waves (Lars von Trier, Denmark)
- Emigration, N.Y. (Egon Humer, Austria)
- Fire (Deepa Mehta, Canada/India)
- Frantz Fanon: Black Skin, White Mask (Isaac Julien, UK)
- Gabbeh (Mohsen Makhmalbaf, Iran)
- Le Garçu (Maurice Pialat, France)
- Goodbye South, Goodbye (Hou Hsiao-hsien, Taiwan)
- illtown (Nick Gomez, USA)
- Irma Vep (Olivier Assayas, France)
- Lilies (John Greyson, Canada)
- Mahjong (Edward Yang, Taiwan)
- Mandela (Angus Gibson & Jo Menell, USA)
- My Sex Life... or How I Got into an Argument (Arnaud Desplechin, France)
- Nobody's Business (Alan Berliner, USA)
- La Promesse (Jean-Pierre & Luc Dardenne, Belgium)
- Salut cousin! (Merzak Allouache, France/Algeria)
- A Self Made Hero (Jacques Audiard, France)
- Sling Blade (Billy Bob Thornton, USA)
- subUrbia (Richard Linklater, USA)
- Suzanne Farrell: Elusive Muse (Anne Belle & Deborah Dickson, USA)
- Temptress Moon (Chen Kaige, China)
- Three Lives and Only One Death (Raúl Ruiz, France)
- Umm Kulthum: A Voice Like Egypt (Michal Goldman, USA)
- Underground (Emir Kusturica, France/Germany)

== Films at the 35th New York Film Festival (1997) ==
- Opening Night: The Ice Storm (Ang Lee, US)
- Centerpiece: The Sweet Hereafter (Atom Egoyan, Canada)
- Closing Night: Live Flesh (Pedro Almodóvar, Spain)
- The Apostle (Robert Duvall, USA)
- Boogie Nights (Paul Thomas Anderson, USA)
- Deep Crimson (Arturo Ripstein, Mexico)
- Destiny (Youssef Chahine, Egypt)
- Fallen Angels (Wong Kar-wai, Hong Kong)
- Fast, Cheap & out of Control (Errol Morris, USA)
- Fireworks (Takeshi Kitano, Japan)
- From Today Until Tomorrow (Jean-Marie Straub & Danièle Huillet, France)
- Happy Together (Wong Kar-wai, Hong Kong)
- Kiss or Kill (Bill Bennett, Australia)
- Kitchen (Yim Ho, Hong Kong)
- Love and Death on Long Island (Richard Kwietniowski, UK)
- Ma vie en rose (Alain Berliner, Belgium)
- Marcello Mastroianni: I Remember (Anna Maria Tatò, Italy)
- Martín (Hache) (Adolfo Aristarain, Argentina)
- Mother and Son (Alexander Sokurov, Russia)
- Post Coitum (Brigitte Roüan, France)
- Public Housing (Frederick Wiseman, USA)
- Taste of Cherry (Abbas Kiarostami, Iran)
- Telling Lies in America (Guy Ferland, USA)
- La Vie de Jésus (Bruno Dumont, France)
- Voyage to the Beginning of the World (Manoel de Oliveira, Portugal)
- Washington Square (Agnieszka Holland, USA)

== Films at the 36th New York Film Festival (1998) ==
- Opening Night: Celebrity (Woody Allen, USA)
- Centerpiece: Black Cat, White Cat (Emir Kusturica, Yugoslavia/Germany/France)
- Closing Night: The Dreamlife of Angels (Erick Zonca, France)
- The Apple (Samira Makhmalbaf, Iran/France)
- Autumn Tale (Eric Rohmer, France)
- The Book of Life (Hal Hartley, USA)
- The Celebration (Thomas Vinterberg, Denmark)
- Dr. Akagi (Shohei Imamura, Japan)
- Flowers of Shanghai (Hou Hsiao-hsien, Taiwan)
- The General (John Boorman, Ireland)
- Gods and Monsters (Bill Condon, USA)
- Happiness (Todd Solondz, USA)
- I Stand Alone (Gaspar Noé, France)
- The Inheritors (Stefan Ruzowitzky, Austria)
- Khrustalyov, My Car! (Aleksei German, Russia/France)
- Late August, Early September (Olivier Assayas, France)
- Life on Earth (Abderrahmane Sissako, France/Mauritania/Mali)
- My Name Is Joe (Ken Loach, UK)
- River of Gold (Paulo Rocha, Portugal)
- Rushmore (Wes Anderson, USA)
- Same Old Song (Alain Resnais, France)
- Slam (Marc Levin, USA)
- Velvet Goldmine (Todd Haynes, USA)
- You're Laughing (Paolo and Vittorio Taviani, Italy)

== Films at the 37th New York Film Festival (1999) ==
- Opening Night: All About My Mother (Pedro Almodóvar, Spain)
- Centerpiece: Topsy-Turvy (Mike Leigh, UK)
- Closing Night: Felicia's Journey (Atom Egoyan, UK/Canada)
- Beau travail (Claire Denis, France)
- Being John Malkovich (Spike Jonze, USA)
- Boys Don't Cry (Kimberly Peirce, USA)
- The Carriers Are Waiting (Benoît Mariage, France/Belgium/Switzerland)
- The Color of Paradise (Majid Majidi, Iran)
- Dogma (Kevin Smith, USA)
- Holy Smoke! (Jane Campion, Australia)
- Juha (Aki Kaurismäki, Finland)
- julien donkey-boy (Harmony Korine, USA)
- The Letter (Manoel de Oliveira, France/Portugal)
- License to Live (Kiyoshi Kurosawa, Japan)
- Mobutu, King of Zaire (Thierry Michel, Belgium)
- The Other (Youssef Chahine, France/Egypt)
- Pola X (Leos Carax, France)
- Princess Mononoke (Hayao Miyazaki, Japan)
- Pripyat (Nikolaus Geyrhalter, Austria)
- Rien sur Robert (Pascal Bonitzer, France)
- Rosetta (Jean-Pierre & Luc Dardenne, France/Belgium)
- Set Me Free (Léa Pool, Canada)
- Sicilia! (Danièle Huillet & Jean-Marie Straub, Italy)
- Time Regained (Raúl Ruiz, France)
- The Woman Chaser (Robinson Devor, USA)

== Films at the 38th New York Film Festival (2000) ==
- Opening Night: Dancer in the Dark (Lars von Trier, Denmark/Sweden/France)
- Centerpiece: Pollock (Ed Harris, USA)
- Closing Night: Crouching Tiger, Hidden Dragon (Ang Lee, Taiwan)
- Amores perros (Alejandro González Iñárritu, Mexico)
- Before Night Falls (Julian Schnabel, USA)
- Boesman and Lena (John Berry, France/South Africa)
- Brother (Takeshi Kitano, Japan/France/USA/UK)
- Chronically Unfeasible (Sergio Bianchi, Brazil)
- Chunhyang (Im Kwon-taek, South Korea)
- The Circle (Jafar Panahi, Iran)
- The Comedy of Innocence (Raúl Ruiz, France)
- Eureka (Shinji Aoyama, Japan)
- Faithless (Liv Ullmann, Sweden)
- George Washington (David Gordon Green, USA)
- The Gleaners and I (Agnès Varda, France)
- The House of Mirth (Terence Davies, UK/USA)
- In the Mood for Love (Wong Kar-wai, Hong Kong)
- Kippur (Amos Gitai, Israel/France)
- Krapp's Last Tape (Atom Egoyan, Canada/UK)
- Platform (Jia Zhangke, China/Japan)
- Smell of Camphor, Fragrance of Jasmine (Bahman Farmanara, Iran)
- Taboo (Nagisa Oshima, Japan)
- The Taste of Others (Agnès Jaoui, France)
- Yi Yi (Edward Yang, Taiwan/Japan)

== Films at the 39th New York Film Festival (2001) ==
- Opening Night: Va savoir (Jacques Rivette, France)
- Centerpiece: Mulholland Drive (David Lynch, USA)
- Closing Night: In Praise of Love (Jean-Luc Godard, Switzerland/France)
- All About Lily Chou-Chou (Shunji Iwai, Japan)
- Baran (Majid Majidi, Iran)
- Deep Breath (Damien Odoul, France)
- Fat Girl (Catherine Breillat, France/Italy)
- I'm Going Home (Manoel de Oliveira, Portugal/France)
- Intimacy (Patrice Chéreau, France)
- Italian for Beginners (Lone Scherfig, Denmark)
- La ciénaga (Lucrecia Martel, Argentina/Spain)
- La Libertad (Lisandro Alonso, Argentina)
- The Lady and the Duke (Eric Rohmer, France)
- The Royal Tenenbaums (Wes Anderson, USA)
- Silence, We're Rolling (Youssef Chahine, Egypt/France)
- Sobibor, October 14, 1943, 4 p.m. (Claude Lanzmann, France)
- The Son's Room (Nanni Moretti, Italy)
- Storytelling (Todd Solondz, USA)
- That Old Dream That Moves (Alain Guiraudie, France)
- Time Out (Laurent Cantet, France)
- Waking Life (Richard Linklater, USA)
- Warm Water Under a Red Bridge (Shohei Imamura, Japan)
- What Time Is It There? (Tsai Ming-liang, Taiwan/France)
- Y tu mamá también (Alfonso Cuarón, Mexico)

== Films at the 40th New York Film Festival (2002) ==
- Opening Night: About Schmidt (Alexander Payne, USA)
- Centerpiece: Punch-Drunk Love (Paul Thomas Anderson, USA)
- Closing Night: Talk to Her (Pedro Almodóvar, Spain)
- Auto Focus (Paul Schrader, USA)
- Blind Spot: Hitler's Secretary (André Heller & Othmar Schimderer, Austria)
- Bloody Sunday (Paul Greengrass, UK)
- Chi-hwa-seon (Im Kwon-taek, South Korea)
- Divine Intervention (Elia Suleiman, France/Palestine)
- Friday Night (Claire Denis, France)
- Love & Diane (Jennifer Dworkin, USA/France)
- The Magdalene Sisters (Peter Mullan, UK)
- The Man Without a Past (Aki Kaurismäki, Finland)
- Monday Morning (Otar Iosseliani, France/Italy)
- My Mother's Smile (Marco Bellocchio, Italy)
- Russian Ark (Alexander Sokurov, Russia/Germany)
- Safe Conduct (Bertrand Tavernier, France)
- The Son (Jean-Pierre & Luc Dardenne, Belgium/France)
- Springtime in a Small Town (Tian Zhuangzhuang, China)
- Ten (Abbas Kiarostami, Iran/France)
- To Be and to Have (Nicolas Philibert, France)
- Turning Gate (Hong Sang-soo, South Korea)
- The Uncertainty Principle (Manoel de Oliveira, Portugal/France)
- Unknown Pleasures (Jia Zhangke, China/Japan)
- Waiting for Happiness (Abderrahmane Sissako, Mauritania/France)

== Films at the 41st New York Film Festival (2003) ==
- Opening Night: Mystic River (Clint Eastwood, USA)
- Centerpiece: The Fog of War (Errol Morris, USA)
- Closing Night: 21 Grams (Alejandro González Iñárritu, USA)
- The Barbarian Invasions (Denys Arcand, Canada)
- Bright Leaves (Ross McElwee, USA)
- Crimson Gold (Jafar Panahi, Iran)
- Distant (Nuri Bilge Ceylan, Turkey)
- Dogville (Lars von Trier, Denmark/Sweden/France)
- Elephant (Gus Van Sant, USA)
- The Flower of Evil (Claude Chabrol, France)
- Free Radicals (Barbara Albert, Austria)
- Good Morning, Night (Marco Bellocchio, Italy)
- Goodbye, Dragon Inn (Tsai Ming-liang, Taiwan)
- Mansion by the Lake (Lester James Peries, Sri Lanka)
- Mayor of the Sunset Strip (George Hickenlooper, USA)
- Pornography (Jan Jakub Kolski, Poland)
- PTU (Johnnie To, Hong Kong)
- Raja (Jacques Doillon, France)
- S-21: The Khmer Rouge Killing Machine (Rithy Panh, France)
- Since Otar Left (Julie Bertuccelli, France)
- A Thousand Months (Faouzi Bensaïdi, France/Morocco)
- Young Adam (David Mackenzie, UK)

== Films at the 42nd New York Film Festival (2004) ==
- Opening Night: Look at Me (Agnès Jaoui, France)
- Centerpiece: Bad Education (Pedro Almodóvar, Spain)
- Closing Night: Sideways (Alexander Payne, USA)
- Café Lumière (Hou Hsiao-hsien, Japan/Taiwan)
- The Gate of the Sun (Yousry Nasrallah, France/Egypt)
- The Holy Girl (Lucrecia Martel, Argentina)
- House of Flying Daggers (Zhang Yimou, China)
- In the Battlefields (Danielle Arbid, Lebanon/France)
- Keane (Lodge Kerrigan, USA)
- Kings and Queen (Arnaud Desplechin, France)
- Moolaadé (Ousmane Sembène, Senegal)
- Notre musique (Jean-Luc Godard, Switzerland/France)
- Or (My Treasure) (Keren Yedaya, Israel)
- Palindromes (Todd Solondz, USA)
- Rolling Family (Pablo Trapero, Argentina)
- Saraband (Ingmar Bergman, Sweden)
- Tarnation (Jonathan Caouette, USA)
- The 10th District Court: Moments of Trial (Raymond Depardon, France)
- Triple Agent (Eric Rohmer, France)
- Tropical Malady (Apichatpong Weerasethakul, Thailand)
- Undertow (David Gordon Green, USA)
- Vera Drake (Mike Leigh, UK)
- Woman Is the Future of Man (Hong Sang-soo, South Korea/France)
- The World (Jia Zhangke, China)

== Films at the 43rd New York Film Festival (2005) ==
- Opening Night: Good Night, and Good Luck. (George Clooney, USA)
- Centerpiece: Breakfast on Pluto (Neil Jordan, USA)
- Closing Night: Caché (Michael Haneke, France)
- Avenge But One of My Two Eyes (Avi Mograbi, Israel/France)
- Bubble (Steven Soderbergh, USA)
- Capote (Bennett Miller, USA)
- The Death of Mr. Lazarescu (Cristi Puiu, Romania)
- L'Enfant (Jean-Pierre & Luc Dardenne, Belgium/France)
- Gabrielle (Patrice Chéreau, France)
- I Am (Dorota Kedzierzawska, Poland)
- Manderlay (Lars von Trier, Denmark/Sweden/France)
- Methadonia (Michel Negroponte, USA)
- Paradise Now (Hany Abu-Assad, Netherlands/Germany/France)
- The President's Last Bang (Im Sang-soo, South Korea)
- Regular Lovers (Philippe Garrel, France)
- Something Like Happiness (Bohdan Sláma, Czech Republic)
- The Squid and the Whale (Noah Baumbach, USA)
- The Sun (Alexander Sokurov, Russia/Italy/France/Switzerland)
- Sympathy for Lady Vengeance (Park Chan-wook, South Korea)
- Tale of Cinema (Hong Sang-soo, South Korea)
- Three Times (Hou Hsiao-hsien, Taiwan)
- Through the Forest (Jean-Paul Civeyrac, France)
- Tristram Shandy: A Cock and Bull Story (Michael Winterbottom, UK)
- Who's Camus Anyway? (Mitsuo Yanagimachi, Japan)

== Films at the 44th New York Film Festival (2006) ==
- Opening Night: The Queen (Stephen Frears, UK)
- Centerpiece: Volver (Pedro Almodóvar, Spain)
- Closing Night: Pan's Labyrinth (Guillermo del Toro, Spain/Mexico)
- 49 Up (Michael Apted, UK)
- August Days (Marc Recha, Spain)
- Bamako (Abderrahmane Sissako, Africa)
- Belle Toujours (Manoel de Oliveira, Portugal)
- Climates (Nuri Bilge Ceylan, Turkey)
- Election 2 (Johnnie To, Hong Kong)
- Falling (Barbara Albert, Germany/Austria)
- Gardens in Autumn (Otar Iosseliani, France/Italy/Russia)
- The Go Master (Tian Zhuangzhuang, Japan/China)
- The Host (Bong Joon-ho, South Korea)
- Inland Empire (David Lynch, US)
- The Journals of Knud Rasmussen (Zacharias Kunuk & Norman Cohn, Canada/Denmark/Greenland)
- Little Children (Todd Field, US)
- Marie Antoinette (Sofia Coppola, US)
- Offside (Jafar Panahi, Iran)
- Our Daily Bread (Nikolaus Geyrhalter, Germany/Austria)
- Paprika (Satoshi Kon, Japan)
- Poison Friends (Emmanuel Bourdieu, France)
- Private Fears in Public Places (Alain Resnais, France)
- Syndromes and a Century (Apichatpong Weerasethakul, Thailand)
- These Girls (Tahani Rached, Egypt)
- Woman on the Beach (Hong Sang-soo, South Korea)

== Films at the 45th New York Film Festival (2007) ==
- Opening Night: The Darjeeling Limited (Wes Anderson, USA)
- Centerpiece: No Country for Old Men (Joel Coen & Ethan Coen, USA)
- Closing Night: Persepolis (Marjane Satrapi & Vincent Paronnaud, France)
- Actresses (Valeria Bruni Tedeschi, France)
- Alexandra (Alexander Sokurov, Russia)
- The Axe in the Attic (Ed Pincus & Lucia Small, USA)
- Before the Devil Knows You're Dead (Sidney Lumet, USA)
- Calle Santa Fe (Carmen Castillo, France)
- The Diving Bell and the Butterfly (Julian Schnabel, USA)
- Flight of the Red Balloon (Hou Hsiao-hsien, France)
- 4 Months, 3 Weeks and 2 Days (Cristian Mungiu, Romania)
- A Girl Cut in Two (Claude Chabrol, France)
- Go Go Tales (Abel Ferrara, Italy/USA)
- I Just Didn't Do It (Masayuki Suo, Japan)
- I'm Not There (Todd Haynes, USA)
- In the City of Sylvia (José Luis Guerin, Spain/France)
- The Last Mistress (Catherine Breillat, France)
- The Man From London (Béla Tarr, Hungary/France/Germany)
- Margot at the Wedding (Noah Baumbach, USA)
- Married Life (Ira Sachs, USA)
- Mr. Warmth: The Don Rickles Project (John Landis, USA)
- The Orphanage (J.A. Bayona, Spain)
- Paranoid Park (Gus Van Sant, USA)
- Redacted (Brian De Palma, USA)
- The Romance of Astrea and Celadon (Eric Rohmer, France)
- Secret Sunshine (Lee Chang-dong, South Korea)
- Silent Light (Carlos Reygadas, Mexico)
- Useless (Jia Zhangke, Hong Kong)

== Films at the 46th New York Film Festival (2008) ==
- Opening Night: The Class (Laurent Cantet, France)
- Centerpiece: Changeling (Clint Eastwood, USA)
- Closing Night: The Wrestler (Darren Aronofsky, USA)
- 24 City (Jia Zhangke, China/Hong Kong/Japan)
- Afterschool (Antonio Campos, USA)
- Ashes of Time Redux (Wong Kar-wai, Hong Kong)
- Bullet in the Head (Jaime Rosales, Spain/France)
- Che (Steven Soderbergh, France/Spain)
- Chouga (Darezhan Omirbaev, France/Kazakhstan)
- A Christmas Tale (Arnaud Desplechin, France)
- Four Nights with Anna (Jerzy Skolimowski, Poland/France)
- Gomorrah (Matteo Garrone, Italy)
- Happy-Go-Lucky (Mike Leigh, UK)
- The Headless Woman (Lucrecia Martel, Argentina/France/Italy/Spain)
- Hunger (Steve McQueen, UK)
- I'm Gonna Explode (Gerardo Naranjo, Mexico)
- Let It Rain (Agnès Jaoui, France)
- Night and Day (Hong Sang-soo, South Korea)
- The Northern Land (João Botelho, Portugal)
- Serbis (Brillante Mendoza, Philippines/France/)
- Summer Hours (Olivier Assayas, France)
- Tokyo Sonata (Kiyoshi Kurosawa, Japan/Netherlands)
- Tony Manero (Pablo Larraín, Chile/Brazil)
- Tulpan (Sergey Dvortsevoy, Germany/Kazakhstan/Poland/Russia/Switzerland)
- Waltz with Bashir (Ari Folman, Israel/Germany/France/)
- Wendy and Lucy (Kelly Reichardt, USA)
- The Windmill Movie (Alexander Olch, USA)

== Films at the 47th New York Film Festival (2009) ==
- Opening Night: Wild Grass (Alain Resnais, France)
- Centerpiece: Precious: Based on the Novel "Push" by Sapphire (Lee Daniels, USA)
- Closing Night: Broken Embraces (Pedro Almodóvar, Spain)
- Around a Small Mountain (Jacques Rivette, France)
- Antichrist (Lars von Trier, Denmark)
- The Art of the Steal (Don Argott, USA)
- Bluebeard (Catherine Breillat, France)
- Eccentricities of a Blonde-Haired Girl (Manoel de Oliveira, Portugal/France)
- Everyone Else (Maren Ade, Germany)
- Ghost Town (Zhao Dayong, China)
- Hadewijch (Bruno Dumont, France)
- Independencia (Raya Martin, Philippines)
- Henri-Georges Clouzot's Inferno (Serge Bromberg, France)
- Kanikôsen (Sabu, Japan)
- Lebanon (Samuel Maoz, Israel)
- Life During Wartime (Todd Solondz, USA)
- Min Ye (Souleymane Cissé, Mali/France)
- Mother (Bong Joon-ho, South Korea)
- Ne change rien (Pedro Costa, France/Portugal)
- Police, Adjective (Corneliu Porumboiu, Romania)
- Room and a Half (Andrei Khrzhanovsky, Russia)
- Sweetgrass (Alisa Barbash & Lucien Castaing-Taylor, USA)
- Sweet Rush (Andrzej Wajda, Poland/France)
- To Die Like a Man (João Pedro Rodrigues, Portugal)
- Trash Humpers (Harmony Korine, USA/UK)
- Vincere (Marco Bellocchio, Italy)
- White Material (Claire Denis, France)
- The White Ribbon (Michael Haneke, Austria/France)

== Films at the 48th New York Film Festival (2010) ==
- Opening Night: The Social Network (David Fincher, USA)
- Centerpiece: The Tempest (Julie Taymor, USA)
- Closing Night: Hereafter (Clint Eastwood, USA)
- Another Year (Mike Leigh, UK)
- Aurora (Cristi Puiu, Romania)
- Black Venus (Abdellatif Kechiche, France)
- Carlos (Olivier Assayas, France)
- Certified Copy (Abbas Kiarostami, Iran/France/Italy)
- Film Socialisme (Jean-Luc Godard, France)
- Inside Job (Charles Ferguson, USA)
- Le quattro volte (Michelangelo Frammartino, Italy)
- LENNONYC (Michael Epstein, USA)
- Meek's Cutoff (Kelly Reichardt, USA)
- My Joy (Sergei Loznitsa, Ukraine)
- Mysteries of Lisbon (Raul Ruiz, Portugal)
- Of Gods and Men (Xavier Beauvois, France)
- Oki's Movie (Hong Sang-Soo, South Korea)
- Old Cats (Sebastián Silva, Chile)
- Poetry (Lee Chang-dong, South Korea)
- Post Mortem (Pablo Larraín, Chile)
- Revolución (various directors, Mexico)
- The Robber (Benjamin Heisenberg, Germany)
- Robinson in Ruins (Patrick Keiller, UK)
- Silent Souls (Aleksey Fedorchenko, Russia)
- The Strange Case of Angelica (Manoel de Oliveira, Portugal)
- Tuesday, After Christmas (Radu Muntean, Romania)
- Uncle Boonmee Who Can Recall His Past Lives (Apichatpong Weerasethakul, Thailand)
- We Are What We Are (Jorge Michel Grau, Mexico)

== Films at the 49th New York Film Festival (2011) ==
- Opening Night: Carnage (Roman Polanski, France/Poland)
- Centerpiece: My Week with Marilyn (Simon Curtis, UK)
- Closing Night: The Descendants (Alexander Payne, USA)
- The Artist (Michel Hazanavicius, France)
- Corpo Celeste (Alice Rohrwacher, Italy/Switzerland/France)
- A Dangerous Method (David Cronenberg, Canada/UK/Germany)
- Footnote (Joseph Cedar, Israel)
- 4:44 Last Day on Earth (Abel Ferrara, USA)
- George Harrison: Living in the Material World (Martin Scorsese, USA)
- Goodbye First Love (Mia Hansen-Løve, France)
- Le Havre (Aki Kaurismäki, Finland/France)
- The Kid with a Bike (Jean-Luc and Pierre Dardenne, Belgium/France)
- The Loneliest Planet (Julia Loktev, USA)
- Martha Marcy May Marlene (Sean Durkin, USA)
- Melancholia (Lars von Trier, Denmark)
- Miss Bala (Gerardo Naranjo, Mexico)
- Once Upon a Time in Anatolia (Nuri Bilge Ceylan, Turkey)
- Pina (Wim Wenders, Germany)
- Play (Ruben Östlund, Sweden)
- Policeman (Nadav Lapid, Israel)
- A Separation (Asghar Farhadi, Iran)
- Shame (Steve McQueen, UK)
- The Skin I Live In (Pedro Almodóvar, Spain)
- Sleeping Sickness (Ulrich Köhler, Germany)
- The Student (Santiago Mitre, Argentina)
- The Turin Horse (Béla Tarr, Hungary)
- This Is Not a Film (Jafar Panahi & Mojtaba Mirtahmasb, Iran)

== Films at the 50th New York Film Festival (2012) ==
- Opening Night: Life of Pi (Ang Lee, USA)
- Centerpiece: Not Fade Away (David Chase, USA)
- Closing Night: Flight (Robert Zemeckis, USA)
- Amour (Michael Haneke, Austria/France/Germany)
- Aquí y allá (Antonio Méndez Esparza, Spain/USA/Mexico)
- Araf — Somewhere In Between (Yeşim Ustaoğlu, Turkey/France/Germany)
- Barbara (Christian Petzold, Germany)
- Beyond the Hills (Cristian Mungiu, Romania)
- Bwakaw (Jun Robles Lana, Philippines)
- Caesar Must Die (Paolo and Vittorio Taviani, Italy)
- Camille Rewinds (Noémie Lvovsky, France)
- The Dead Man and Being Happy (Javier Rebello, Spain/Argentina)
- Fill the Void (Rama Burshtein, Israel)
- First Cousin Once Removed (Alan Berliner, USA)
- Frances Ha (Noah Baumbach, USA)
- The Gatekeepers (Dror Moreh, Israel/France/Germany/Belgium)
- Ginger & Rosa (Sally Potter, UK)
- Holy Motors (Leos Carax, France)
- Hyde Park on Hudson (Roger Michell, UK)
- Kinshasa Kids (Marc-Henri Wajnberg, Belgium/France)
- The Last Time I Saw Macao (João Pedro Rodrigues, Portugal/France)
- Leviathan (Lucien Castaing-Taylor & Véréna Paravel, France/UK/USA)
- Like Someone in Love (Abbas Kiarostami, Japan/Iran/France)
- Lines of Wellington (Valeria Sarmiento, France/Portugal)
- Memories Look at Me (Song Fang, China)
- Night Across the Street (Raúl Ruiz, France/Chile)
- NO (Pablo Larraín, Chile/USA/Mexico)
- Our Children (Joachim Lafosse, Belgium/Luxembourg/France/Switzerland)
- The Paperboy (Lee Daniels, USA)
- Passion (Brian De Palma, France/Germany)
- Something in the Air (Olivier Assayas, France)
- Tabu (Miguel Gomes, Portugal)
- You Ain't Seen Nothin' Yet (Alain Resnais, France)

== Films at the 51st New York Film Festival (2013) ==
- Opening Night: Captain Phillips (Paul Greengrass, USA)
- Centerpiece: The Secret Life of Walter Mitty (Ben Stiller, USA)
- Closing Night: Her (Spike Jonze, USA)
- About Time (Richard Curtis, UK)
- Abuse of Weakness (Catherine Breillat, France)
- Alan Partridge (Declan Lowney, UK/France)
- All Is Lost (J.C. Chandor, USA)
- American Promise (Joe Brewster & Michèle Stephenson, USA)
- At Berkeley (Frederick Wiseman, USA)
- Bastards (Claire Denis, France/Germany)
- Blue Is the Warmest Color (Abdellatif Kechiche, France)
- Burning Bush (Agnieszka Holland, Czech Republic)
- Child of God (James Franco, USA)
- Gloria (Sebastián Lelio, Chile/Spain)
- The Immigrant (James Gray, USA)
- Inside Llewyn Davis (Joel Coen & Ethan Coen, USA)
- The Invisible Woman (Ralph Fiennes, UK)
- Jealousy (Philippe Garrel, France)
- Jimmy P.: Psychotherapy of a Plains Indian (Arnaud Desplechin, France)
- The Last of the Unjust (Claude Lanzmann, France/Austria)
- Like Father, Like Son (Hirokazu Kore-eda, Japan)
- The Missing Picture (Rithy Panh, Cambodia)
- My Name Is Hmmm... (Agnès b., France)
- Nebraska (Alexander Payne, USA)
- Nobody's Daughter Haewon (Hong Sang-soo, South Korea)
- Norte, the End of History (Lav Diaz, Philippines)
- Omar (Hany Abu-Assad, Palestine)
- Only Lovers Left Alive (Jim Jarmusch, USA)
- Real (Kiyoshi Kurosawa, Japan)
- The Square (Jehane Noujaim, USA/Egypt)
- Stranger by the Lake (Alain Guiraudie, France)
- Stray Dogs (Tsai Ming-liang, Taiwan/France)
- A Touch of Sin (Jia Zhangke, China)
- Le Week-End (Roger Michell, UK)
- When Evening Falls on Bucharest or Metabolism (Corneliu Porumboiu, Romania/France)
- The Wind Rises (Hayao Miyazaki, Japan)

== Films at the 52nd New York Film Festival (2014) ==
- Opening Night: Gone Girl (David Fincher, USA)
- Centerpiece: Inherent Vice (Paul Thomas Anderson, USA)
- Closing Night: Birdman, or (The Unexpected Virtue of Ignorance) (Alejandro González Iñárritu, USA)
- Beloved Sisters (Dominik Graf, Germany/Austria)
- The Blue Room (Mathieu Amalric, France)
- Citizenfour (Laura Poitras, USA/Germany)
- Clouds of Sils Maria (Olivier Assayas, Switzerland/Germany/France)
- Eden (Mia Hansen-Løve, France)
- Foxcatcher (Bennett Miller, USA)
- Goodbye to Language (Jean-Luc Godard, France)
- Heaven Knows What (Josh & Benny Safdie, USA)
- Hill of Freedom (Hong Sang-soo, South Korea)
- Horse Money (Pedro Costa, Portugal)
- Jauja (Lisandro Alonso, Argentina/Denmark/France/Mexico/USA/Germany/Brazil)
- Life of Riley (Alain Resnais, France)
- Listen Up Philip (Alex Ross Perry, USA)
- Maps to the Stars (David Cronenberg, Canada/Germany)
- Misunderstood (Asia Argento, Italy/France)
- Mr. Turner (Mike Leigh, UK)
- Pasolini (Abel Ferrara, France/Belgium/Italy)
- The Princess of France (Matías Piñeiro, Argentina)
- Saint Laurent (Bertrand Bonello, France)
- La Sapienza (Eugène Green, France/Italy)
- '71 (Yann Demange, UK)
- Tales of the Grim Sleeper (Nick Broomfield, USA/UK)
- Timbuktu (Abderrahmane Sissako, France/Mauritania)
- Time out of Mind (Oren Moverman, USA)
- Two Days, One Night (Jean-Pierre & Luc Dardenne, Belgium/France/Italy)
- Two Shots Fired (Martín Rejtman, Argentina)
- Whiplash (Damien Chazelle, USA)
- The Wonders (Alice Rohrwacher, Italy/Switzerland/Germany)

== Films at the 53rd New York Film Festival (2015) ==
- Opening Night: The Walk (Robert Zemeckis, USA)
- Centerpiece: Steve Jobs (Danny Boyle, USA)
- Closing Night: Miles Ahead (Don Cheadle, USA)
- Arabian Nights: Volume One, The Restless One (Miguel Gomes, Portugal/France/Germany/Switzerland)
- Arabian Nights: Volume Two, The Desolate One (Miguel Gomes, Portugal/France/Germany/Switzerland)
- Arabian Nights: Volume Three, The Enchanted One (Miguel Gomes, Portugal/France/Germany/Switzerland)
- The Assassin (Hou Hsiao-hsien, Taiwan/China/Hong Kong)
- Bridge of Spies (Steven Spielberg, USA)
- Brooklyn (John Crowley, UK/Ireland/Canada)
- Carol (Todd Haynes, USA)
- Cemetery of Splendour (Apichatpong Weerasethakul, Thailand/UK/France/Germany/Malaysia)
- Les Cowboys (Thomas Bidegain, France)
- Don't Blink – Robert Frank (Laura Israel, USA/Canada)
- Experimenter: The Stanley Milgram Story (Michael Almereyda, USA)
- The Forbidden Room (Guy Maddin, Canada)
- In the Shadow of Women (Philippe Garrel, France)
- Journey to the Shore (Kiyoshi Kurosawa, Japan/France)
- The Lobster (Yorgos Lanthimos, France/Netherlands/Greece/UK)
- Maggie's Plan (Rebecca Miller, USA)
- The Measure of a Man (Stéphane Brizé, France)
- Mia Madre (Nanni Moretti, Italy/France)
- Microbe & Gasoline (Michel Gondry, France)
- Mountains May Depart (Jia Zhangke, China/France/Japan)
- My Golden Days (Arnaud Desplechin, France)
- No Home Movie (Chantal Akerman, Belgium/France)
- Right Now, Wrong Then (Hong Sang-soo, South Korea)
- The Treasure (Corneliu Porumboiu, Romania)
- Where to Invade Next (Michael Moore, USA)

== Films at the 54th New York Film Festival (2016) ==
- Opening Night: 13th (Ava DuVernay, USA)
- Centerpiece: 20th Century Women (Mike Mills, USA)
- Closing Night: The Lost City of Z (James Gray, USA)
- Aquarius (Kleber Mendonça Filho, Brazil/France)
- Certain Women (Kelly Reichardt, USA)
- Elle (Paul Verhoeven, France/Germany)
- Fire at Sea (Gianfranco Rosi, Italy/France)
- Graduation (Cristian Mungiu, Romania)
- Hermia & Helena (Matías Piñeiro, Argentina/USA)
- I, Daniel Blake (Ken Loach, UK)
- Julieta (Pedro Almodóvar, Spain)
- Manchester By The Sea (Kenneth Lonergan, USA)
- Moonlight (Barry Jenkins, USA)
- My Entire High School Sinking into the Sea (Dash Shaw, USA)
- Neruda (Pablo Larraín, Chile/Argentina/France/Spain)
- Paterson (Jim Jarmusch, USA)
- Personal Shopper (Olivier Assayas, France)
- The Rehearsal (Alison Maclean, New Zealand)
- Sieranevada (Cristi Puiu, Romania)
- The Son of Joseph (Eugène Green, France/Belgium)
- Staying Vertical (Alain Guiraudie, France)
- Things to Come (Mia Hansen-Løve, France/Germany)
- Toni Erdmann (Maren Ade, Germany)
- The Unknown Girl (Jean-Pierre & Luc Dardenne, Belgium)
- Yourself and Yours (Hong Sang-soo, South Korea)

== Films at the 55th New York Film Festival (2017) ==
- Opening Night: Last Flag Flying (Richard Linklater, USA)
- Centerpiece: Wonderstruck (Todd Haynes, USA)
- Closing Night: Wonder Wheel (Woody Allen, USA)
- Before We Vanish (Kiyoshi Kurosawa, Japan)
- BPM (Beats per Minute) (Robin Campillo, France)
- Call Me by Your Name (Luca Guadagnino, Italy/France)
- The Day After (Hong Sang-soo, South Korea)
- Faces Places (Agnès Varda, France)
- Félicité (Alain Gomis, France/Senegal/Belgium/Germany/Lebanon)
- The Florida Project (Sean Baker, USA)
- Ismael's Ghosts (Arnaud Desplechin, France)
- Lady Bird (Greta Gerwig, USA)
- Let the Sunshine In (Claire Denis, France)
- Lover for a Day (Philippe Garrel, France)
- The Meyerowitz Stories (New and Selected) (Noah Baumbach, USA)
- Mrs. Hyde (Serge Bozon, France)
- Mudbound (Dee Rees, USA)
- On the Beach at Night Alone (Hong Sang-soo, South Korea)
- The Other Side of Hope (Aki Kaurismäki, Finland)
- The Rider (Chloé Zhao, USA)
- Spoor (Agnieszka Holland, Poland/Germany/Czech Republic)
- The Square (Ruben Östlund, Sweden)
- Thelma (Joachim Trier, Norway/Sweden/France)
- Western (Valeska Grisebach, Germany/Bulgaria)
- Zama (Lucrecia Martel, Argentina/Brazil/Spain)

== Films at the 56th New York Film Festival (2018) ==
- Opening Night: The Favourite (Yorgos Lanthimos, Ireland/UK/US)
- Centerpiece: Roma (Alfonso Cuarón, Mexico)
- Closing Night: At Eternity's Gate (Julian Schnabel, US/France)
- 3 Faces (Jafar Panahi, Iran)
- Asako I & II (Ryūsuke Hamaguchi, Japan/France)
- Ash Is Purest White (Jia Zhangke, China)
- The Ballad of Buster Scruggs (Joel Coen & Ethan Coen, USA)
- Burning (Lee Chang-dong, South Korea)
- Cold War (Paweł Pawlikowski, Poland)
- A Faithful Man (Louis Garrel, France)
- A Family Tour (Ying Liang, Taiwan/Hong Kong/Singapore/Malaysia)
- La Flor (Mariano Llinás, Argentina)
- Grass (Hong Sang-soo, South Korea)
- Happy as Lazzaro (Alice Rohrwacher, Italy)
- Her Smell (Alex Ross Perry, USA)
- High Life (Claire Denis, Germany/France/USA/UK/Poland)
- Hotel by the River (Hong Sang-soo, South Korea)
- If Beale Street Could Talk (Barry Jenkins, USA)
- The Image Book (Jean-Luc Godard, Switzerland)
- In My Room (Ulrich Köhler, Germany)
- Long Day's Journey Into Night (Bi Gan, China/France)
- Monrovia, Indiana (Frederick Wiseman, USA)
- Non-Fiction (Olivier Assayas, France)
- Private Life (Tamara Jenkins, USA)
- Ray & Liz (Richard Billingham, UK)
- Shoplifters (Hirokazu Kore-eda, Japan)
- Sorry Angel (Christophe Honoré, France)
- Too Late to Die Young (Dominga Sotomayor Castillo, Chile/Brazil/Argentina/Netherlands/Qatar)
- Transit (Christian Petzold, Germany/France)
- Wildlife (Paul Dano, USA)

== Films at the 57th New York Film Festival (2019) ==
- Opening Night: The Irishman (Martin Scorsese, US)
- Centerpiece: Marriage Story (Noah Baumbach, US)
- Closing Night: Motherless Brooklyn (Edward Norton, US)
- Atlantics (Mati Diop, France/Senegal/Belgium)
- Bacurau (Kleber Mendonça Filho & Juliano Dornelles, Brazil)
- Beanpole (Kantemir Balagov, Russia)
- Fire Will Come (Oliver Laxe, Spain/France/Luxembourg)
- First Cow (Kelly Reichardt, USA)
- A Girl Missing (Kōji Fukada, Japan)
- I Was at Home, but... (Angela Schanelec, Germany)
- Liberté (Albert Serra, France/Portugal/Spain)
- Martin Eden (Pietro Marcello, Italy)
- The Moneychanger (Federico Veiroj, Uruguay)
- Oh Mercy! (Arnaud Desplechin, France)
- Pain and Glory (Pedro Almodóvar, Spain)
- Parasite (Bong Joon-ho, South Korea)
- Portrait of a Lady on Fire (Céline Sciamma, France)
- Saturday Fiction (Lou Ye, China)
- Sibyl (Justine Triet, France/Belgium)
- Synonyms (Nadav Lapid, France/Israel/Germany)
- To the Ends of the Earth (Kiyoshi Kurosawa, Japan)
- The Traitor (Marco Bellocchio, Italy)
- Varda by Agnès (Agnès Varda, France)
- Vitalina Varela (Pedro Costa, Portugal)
- Wasp Network (Olivier Assayas, France/Spain/Brazil)
- The Whistlers (Corneliu Porumboiu, Romania)
- The Wild Goose Lake (Diao Yinan, China/France)
- Young Ahmed (Jean-Pierre & Luc Dardenne, Belgium)
- Zombi Child (Bertrand Bonello, France)

== Films at the 58th New York Film Festival (2020) ==
- Opening Night: Lovers Rock (Steve McQueen, United Kingdom)
- Centerpiece: Nomadland (Chloé Zhao, US)
- Closing Night: French Exit (Azazel Jacobs, UK/Canada)
- Atarrabi and Mikelats (Eugène Green, Belgium/France)
- Beginning (Déa Kulumbegashvili, Georgia)
- The Calming (Song Fang, China)
- City Hall (Frederick Wiseman, US)
- Days (Tsai Ming-liang, Taiwan)
- The Disciple (Chaitanya Tamhane, India)
- Gunda (Viktor Kossakovsky, US/Norway)
- I Carry You With Me (Heidi Ewing, US/Mexico)
- Isabella (Matías Piñeiro, Argentina)
- Malmkrog (Cristi Puiu, Romania)
- Mangrove (Steve McQueen, UK)
- MLK/FBI (Sam Pollard, US)
- Night of the Kings (Philippe Lacôte, France/Côte d'Ivoire/Canada/Senegal)
- Notturno (Gianfranco Rosi, Italy)
- Red, White & Blue (Steve McQueen, UK)
- The Salt of Tears (Philippe Garrel, France)
- Swimming Out Till the Sea Turns Blue (Jia Zhangke, China)
- Time (Garrett Bradley, US)
- Tragic Jungle (Yulene Olaizola, Mexico)
- The Truffle Hunters (Michael Dweck & Gregory Kershaw, US/Greece/Italy)
- Undine (Christian Petzold, Germany)
- The Woman Who Ran (Hong Sang-soo, South Korea)

== Films at the 59th New York Film Festival (2021) ==
- Opening Night: The Tragedy of Macbeth (Joel Coen, US)
- Centerpiece: The Power of the Dog (Jane Campion, Australia/Canada/New Zealand/UK/US)
- Closing Night: Parallel Mothers (Pedro Almodóvar, Spain)
- A Chiara (Jonas Carpignano, Italy/France/US/Sweden)
- Ahed's Knee (Nadav Lapid, Israel/France/Germany)
- Bad Luck Banging or Loony Porn (Radu Jude, Romania)
- Benedetta (Paul Verhoeven, France/Netherlands)
- Bergman Island (Mia Hansen-Løve, France/Mexico/Brazil/Germany)
- Il Buco (Michelangelo Frammartino, Italy/Germany/France)
- Drive My Car, (Ryusuke Hamaguchi, Japan)
- The First 54 Years: An Abbreviated Manual for Military Occupation (Avi Mograbo, Israel)
- Flee (Jonas Poher Rasmussen, Denmark/US/UK/France/Sweden/Norway)
- France (Bruno Dumont, France)
- Futura (Pietro Marcello, Francesco Munzi, Alice Rohrwacher, Italy)
- The Girl and the Spider, (Ramon and Silvan Zürcher, Sweden)
- Hit the Road (Panah Panahi, Iran)
- In Front of Your Face (Hong Sang-soo, South Korea)
- Întregalde (Radu Muntean, Romania)
- Introduction (Hong Sang-soo, South Korea)
- Memoria (Apichatpong Weerasethakul, Colombia/France/Germany/Mexico/Thailand/UK)
- Neptune Frost (Saul Williams, Anisia Uzeyman, Rwanda, US)
- Passing (Rebecca Hall, US/UK)
- Petite Maman (Céline Sciamma, France)
- Prayers for the Stolen (Tatiana Huezo, Mexico)
- The Souvenir Part II (Joanna Hogg, US/UK/Ireland)
- Titane (Julia Ducournau, France/Belgium)
- Unclenching the Fists (Kira Kovalenko, Russia)
- The Velvet Underground (Todd Haynes, US)
- Vortex (Gaspar Noé, France)
- What Do We See When We Look at the Sky? (Alexander Koberidze, Georgia)
- Wheel of Fortune and Fantasy (Ryusuke Hamaguchi, Japan)
- The Worst Person in the World (Joachim Trier, Norway/Sweden/France)

== Films at the 60th New York Film Festival (2022) ==
- Opening Night: White Noise (Noah Baumbach, US/UK)
- Centerpiece: All the Beauty and the Bloodshed (Laura Poitras, US)
- Closing Night: The Inspection (Elegance Bratton, US)
- NYFF 60th Anniversary Celebration: Armageddon Time (James Gray, US)
- Aftersun (Charlotte Wells, US/UK)
- Alcarràs (Carla Simón, Spain/Italy)
- All That Breathes (Shaunak Sen, India/US/UK)
- Corsage (Marie Kreutzer, Austria/France/Germany)
- A Couple (Frederick Wiseman, France/US)
- De Humani Corporis Fabrica (Véréna Paravel and Lucien Castaing-Taylor, France/Switzerland)
- Decision to Leave (Park Chan-wook, South Korea)
- Descendant (Margaret Brown, US)
- Enys Men (Mark Jenkin, UK)
- EO (Jerzy Skolimowski, Poland/Italy)
- The Eternal Daughter (Joanna Hogg, UK)
- Master Gardener (Paul Schrader, US)
- No Bears (Jafar Panahi, Iran)
- The Novelist's Film (Hong Sang-Soo, South Korea)
- One Fine Morning (Mia Hansen-Løve, France)
- Pacifiction (Albert Serra, France/Spain/Germany/Portugal)
- R.M.N. (Cristian Mungiu, Romania)
- Return to Seoul (Davy Chou, France/Cambodia)
- Saint Omer (Alice Diop, France)
- Scarlet (Pietro Marcello, France/Italy/Germany/Russia)
- Showing Up (Kelly Reichardt, US)
- Stars at Noon (Claire Denis, France/Panama)
- Stonewalling (Huang Ji and Ryuji Otsuka, Japan)
- Tár (Todd Field, US/Germany)
- Trenque Lauquen (Laura Citarella, Argentina/Germany)
- Triangle of Sadness (Ruben Östlund, Sweden/UK/US/France/Greece)
- Unrest (Cyril Schäublin, Switzerland)
- Walk Up (Hong Sang-soo, South Korea)

== Films at the 61st New York Film Festival (2023) ==
- Opening Night: May December (Todd Haynes, US)
- Centerpiece: Priscilla (Sofia Coppola, US)
- Closing Night: Ferrari (Michael Mann, US)
- Spotlight Gala: Maestro (Bradley Cooper, US)
- About Dry Grasses (Nuri Bilge Ceylan, Turkey)
- All Dirt Roads Taste of Salt (Raven Jackson, US)
- All of Us Strangers (Andrew Haigh, UK)
- Anatomy of a Fall (Justin Triet; France)
- The Beast (Bertrand Bonello, France)
- La Chimera (Alice Rohrwacher, Italy)
- Close Your Eyes (Victor Erice, Spain)
- The Delinquents (Rodrigo Moreno, Argentina)
- Do Not Expect Too Much from the End of the World (Radu Jude, Romania)
- Eureka (Lisandro Alonso, Argentina/France/Portugal)
- Evil Does Not Exist (Ryûsuke Hamaguchi, Japan)
- Fallen Leaves (Aki Kaurismaki, Finland)
- Green Border (Agnieszka Holland, Poland/Czech Republic/France/Belgium)
- Here (Bas Devos, Belgium)
- In Our Day (Hong Sangsoo, South Korea)
- In Water (Hong Sangsoo, South Korea)
- Janet Planet (Annie Baker, US)
- Kidnapped (Marco Bellocchio, Italy)
- Last Summer (Catherine Breillat, France)
- Music (Angela Schanelec, Germany/France/Greece/Serbia)
- Orlando, My Political Biography (Paul B. Preciado, France)
- Perfect Days (Wim Wenders, Japan/Germany)
- Pictures of Ghosts (Kleber Mendonça Filho, Brazil)
- Poor Things (Yorgos Lanthimos, US/UK/Ireland)
- La Práctica (Martín Rejtman, Argentina/Chile/Portugal)
- The Settlers (Felipe Gálvez, Chile)
- The Shadowless Tower (Zhang Lu, China)
- The Zone of Interest (Jonathan Glazer, UK/US/Poland)
- Youth (Spring) (Wang Bing, France/Luxembourg/Netherlands)
- Pier Paolo Pasolini – Agnès Varda – New York – 1967 (Agnès Varda, France)

== Films at the 62nd New York Film Festival (2024) ==
- Opening Night: Nickel Boys (RaMell Ross, US)
- Centerpiece: The Room Next Door (Pedro Almodóvar, Spain)
- Closing Night: Blitz (Steve McQueen, UK/US)
- Spotlight Gala: Queer (Luca Guadagnino, Italy/US)
- Afternoons of Solitude (Albert Serra, Spain)
- All We Imagine as Light (Payal Kapadia, India/France/Italy/Luxembourg/Netherlands)
- Anora (Sean Baker, US)
- Apocalypse in the Tropics (Petra Costa, Brazil/US/Denmark)
- April (Dea Kulumbegashvili, Georgia/France/Italy)
- The Brutalist (Brady Corbet, US/UK/Hungary)
- By the Stream (Hong Sang-soo, South Korea)
- Caught by the Tides (Jia Zhangke, China)
- Dahomey (Mati Diop, Benin/France/Senegal)
- The Damned (Roberto Minervini, Belgium/Italy/US)
- Eephus (Carson Lund, US)
- Elton John: Never Too Late (R. J. Cutler and David Furnish, US/UK)
- Emilia Pérez (Jacques Audiard, France)
- The Friend (Scott McGehee and David Siegel, US)
- Grand Tour (Miguel Gomes, Portugal/France/Italy)
- Happyend (Neo Sora, Japan/US)
- Hard Truths (Mike Leigh, UK/Spain)
- Harvest (Athina Rachel Tsangari, UK/Germany/Greece/France/US)
- I'm Still Here (Walter Salles, Brazil/France)
- It's Not Me (Leos Carax, France)
- Maria (Pablo Larraín, Italy/Germany)
- Misericordia (Alain Guiraudie, France/Portugal/Spain)
- My Undesirable Friends: Part I — Last Air in Moscow (Julia Loktev, US)
- No Other Land (Basel Adra, Hamdan Ballal, Yuval Abraham, Rachel Szor, Palestine/Norway)
- Oh, Canada (Paul Schrader, US)
- On Becoming a Guinea Fowl (Rungano Nyoni, Ireland/UK/US/Zambia)
- Pavements (Alex Ross Perry, US)
- Pepe (Nelson Carlo De Los Santos Arias, Dominican Republic/Namibia/Germany/France)
- A Real Pain (Jesse Eisenberg, US/Poland)
- Rumours (Guy Maddin, Evan Johnson and Galen Johnson, Canada/Germany)
- Scénarios (Jean-Luc Godard, France/Japan)
- The Seed of the Sacred Fig (Mohammad Rasoulof, Iran/Germany/France)
- The Shrouds (David Cronenberg, France/Canada)
- Stranger Eyes (Yeo Siew Hua, Singapore/Taiwan/France/US)
- Suburban Fury (Robinson Devor, US)
- Transamazonia (Pia Marais, France/Germany/Switzerland/Taiwan/Brazil)
- A Traveler's Needs (Hong Sang-soo, South Korea)
- TWST / Things We Said Today (Andrei Ujică, France/Romania)
- Union (Brett Story and Stephen Maing, US)
- Viet and Nam (Minh Quý Trương, Vietnam/Philippines/Singapore/France/Netherlands)
- Who by Fire (Philippe Lesage, Canada/France)
- Youth (Hard Times) (Wang Bing, France/Luxembourg/Netherlands)
- Youth (Homecoming) (Wang Bing, France/Luxembourg/Netherlands)
