= List of Italian films of 1978 =

A list of films produced in Italy in 1978 (see 1978 in film):

| Title | Director | Cast | Genre | Notes |
|---|---|---|---|---|
1978
| Amori miei | Steno | Monica Vitti, Johnny Dorelli, Enrico Maria Salerno, Edwige Fenech | Comedy | |
| L'arma | Pasquale Squitieri | Stefano Satta Flores, Claudia Cardinale | Drama | |
| Being Twenty | Fernando Di Leo | Gloria Guida, Lilli Carati | Erotic-drama | |
| The Bermuda Triangle | René Cardona Jr. | John Huston, Gloria Guida | Sci-fi | |
| Blazing Flowers | Gianni Martucci | Marc Porel, George Hilton, Anna Maria Rizzoli | Poliziottesco | |
| Blood and Diamonds | Fernando Di Leo | Claudio Cassinelli, Martin Balsam, Barbara Bouchet | Noir | |
| Blood Feud | Lina Wertmüller | Sophia Loren, Marcello Mastroianni, Giancarlo Giannini, Turi Ferro | Thriller-comedy | |
| The Bloodstained Shadow | Antonio Bido | Lino Capolicchio, Stefania Casini, Craig Hill | Giallo | |
| Le braghe del padrone | Flavio Mogherini | Enrico Montesano, Adolfo Celi | Comedy | |
| Break Up | Enrico Maria Salerno | Ornella Muti, Tony Musante, Monica Guerritore | romance drama | |
| Brothers Till We Die | Umberto Lenzi | Tomas Milian | Poliziottesco | |
| Bye Bye Monkey (Ciao maschio) | Marco Ferreri | Gérard Depardieu, Marcello Mastroianni, James Coco, Geraldine Fitzgerald | Farce | Cannes Award. Filmed in New York City. Spoken in English |
| La Cage aux Folles | Édouard Molinaro | Ugo Tognazzi, Michel Serrault | Comedy | |
| Candido Erotico | Claudio Giorgi | Lilli Carati, María Baxa | Erotic-drama | |
| China 9, Liberty 37 (Amore, piombo e furore) | Monte Hellman | Fabio Testi, Warren Oates, Jenny Agutter | Spaghetti Western | |
| Closed Circuit | Giuliano Montaldo | Giuliano Gemma | Drama | Entered into the 28th Berlin International Film Festival |
| Convoy Busters | Stelvio Massi | Maurizio Merli, Olga Karlatos | Poliziottesco | |
| Corleone | Pasquale Squitieri | Giuliano Gemma, Claudia Cardinale | Crime | |
| Covert Action (Sono stato un agente C.I.A) | Romolo Guerrieri | David Janssen, Corinne Cléry | Eurospy | |
| Damned in Venice | Ugo Liberatore | Renato Cestiè, Rena Niehaus | Horror | |
| Ecce bombo | Nanni Moretti | Nanni Moretti, Lina Sastri | Comedy | Filmed in 16 mm |
| Enfantasme | Sergio Gobbi | Agostina Belli, Stefano Satta Flores | —N/a | Italian-French co-production |
| Eyes Behind the Stars | Mario Gariazzo | Robert Hoffmann, Nathalie Delon, Martin Balsam | science-fiction | |
| Fearless | Stelvio Massi | Maurizio Merli, Joan Collins, Gastone Moschin | Poliziottesco | |
| First Love | Dino Risi | Ugo Tognazzi, Ornella Muti | Commedia all'italiana | |
| Il flauto magico | Giulio Gianini, Emanuele Luzzati | - | Animation | |
| Free Hand for a Tough Cop | Umberto Lenzi | Tomas Milian, Claudio Cassinelli, Henry Silva | Poliziottesco | |
| Gegè Bellavita | Pasquale Festa Campanile | Flavio Bucci, Lina Polito, Pino Caruso | musical-comedy | |
| Geppo il folle | Adriano Celentano | Adriano Celentano, Claudia Mori | musical-comedy | |
| The Greatest Battle | Umberto Lenzi | Henry Fonda, John Huston, Stacy Keach, Giuliano Gemma | Macaroni Combat | |
| How to Lose a Wife and Find a Lover | Pasquale Festa Campanile | Johnny Dorelli, Barbara Bouchet | Comedy | |
| L'immoralita | Massimo Pirri | Lisa Gastoni, Howard Ross | Thriller | |
| The Inglorious Bastards | Enzo G. Castellari | Bo Svenson, Fred Williamson, Ian Bannen | War-action | |
| The Iron Commissioner | Stelvio Massi | Maurizio Merli, Janet Agren | Poliziottesco | |
| Last Feelings | Ruggero Deodato | Carlo Lupo, Vittoria Galeazzi, Luigi Diberti, Jacques Sernas, Angela Goodwin, Fiorenzo Fiorentini | Drama | Italian-Japanese co-production |
| The Last House on the Beach | Franco Prosperi | Florinda Bolkan, Ray Lovelock | Rape and revenge film | |
| La liceale nella classe dei ripetenti | Mariano Laurenti | Lino Banfi, Gloria Guida | Commedia sexy all'italiana | |
| Ligabue | Salvatore Nocita | Flavio Bucci, Andréa Ferréol, Pamela Villoresi | Biographical drama | |
| Little Italy | Bruno Corbucci | Tomás Milián, Eli Wallach | Poliziottesco-comedy | |
| Manaos | Alberto Vázquez-Figueroa | Fabio Testi, Agostina Belli, Florinda Bolkan | Adventure | |
| The Mountain of the Cannibal God | Sergio Martino | Ursula Andress, Stacy Keach, Claudio Cassinelli | Adventure | |
| A Night Full of Rain | Lina Wertmüller | Giancarlo Giannini, Candice Bergen, Michael Tucker | Drama | Entered into the 28th Berlin International Film Festival |
| Odds and Evens | Sergio Corbucci | Terence Hill, Bud Spencer | Action-comedy | |
| Orchestra Rehearsal | Federico Fellini | Baldwin Baas, Clara Colosimo | Musical | |
| Papaya, Love Goddess of the Cannibals | Joe D'Amato | Sirpa Lane | Erotic | |
| The Payoff | Sergio Corbucci | Nino Manfredi, Ugo Tognazzi, Paolo Stoppa | Crime-comedy | |
| Pensione paura | Francesco Barilli | Leonora Fani, Luc Merenda, Lidia Biondi | —N/a | |
| The Perfect Crime | Giuseppe Rosati | Leonard Mann, Alida Valli, Anthony Steel, Gloria Guida | Crime | |
| Professor Kranz tedesco di Germania | Luciano Salce | Paolo Villaggio, Adolfo Celi | Comedy | |
| Quando c'era lui... caro lei! | Giancarlo Santi | Paolo Villaggio, Gianni Cavina, Hugo Pratt, Maria Grazia Buccella | Comedy | |
| Red Rings of Fear | Alberto Negrin | Fabio Testi, Christine Kaufmann | Giallo | |
| The Rip-Off | Anthony M. Dawson | Lee Van Cleef, Karen Black, Lionel Stander | Crime-action | |
| Ritratto di borghesia in nero | Tonino Cervi | Senta Berger, Ornella Muti | Drama | |
| Safari Rally | Bitto Albertini | Marcel Bozzuffi, Joe Dallesandro | Action | |
| The Schoolteacher Goes to Boys' High | Mariano Laurenti | Edwige Fenech, Lino Banfi | Commedia sexy all'italiana | |
| The School Teacher in the House | Michele Massimo Tarantini | Edwige Fenech, Lino Banfi | Commedia sexy all'italiana | |
| Silver Saddle | Lucio Fulci | Giuliano Gemma, Geoffrey Lewis | Spaghetti Western | |
| Skin 'em Alive (Scorticateli vivi) | Mario Siciliano | Bryan Rostron, Karin Well | Mercenary war movie | |
| Stay As You Are (Cosi' come sei) | Alberto Lattuada | Nastassja Kinski, Marcello Mastroianni | Erotic | New Line Cinema gave this film a limited US theatrical release on December 21, 1979. |
| Suggestionata | Alfredo Rizzo | Gabriele Ferzetti, Eleonora Giorgi | Erotic drama | |
| They Call Him Bulldozer | Michele Lupo | Bud Spencer, Raimund Harmstorf | Action-comedy | |
| The Tree of Wooden Clogs (L'albero degli zoccoli) | Ermanno Olmi | real peasants from the Bergamo province | Drama | Palme d'Or winner. David di Donatello Best Film winner |
| Voglia di donna | Franco Bottari | Laura Gemser, Rena Niehaus, Ilona Staller | Commedia sexy all'italiana | |
| Where Are You Going on Holiday? (Dove vai in vacanza?) | Mauro Bolognini, Luciano Salce, Alberto Sordi | Alberto Sordi, Ugo Tognazzi, Paolo Villaggio, Stefania Sandrelli | anthology comedy film | |

== See also ==
- 1978 in Italian television
