= Oedipus Orca =

- Directed by: Eriprando Visconti
- Cinematography: Blasco Giurato
- Edited by: Franco Arcalli
- Music by: James Dashow
- Distributed by: Variety Distribution
- Release date: 4 April 1977
- Country: Italy
- Language: Italian

Oedipus Orca is a 1977 Italian sexploitation-thriller film directed by Eriprando Visconti. It is a sequel to La Orca, filmed the same/next year.

== Cast ==
- Michele Placido: Michele
- Rena Niehaus: Alice
- Gabriele Ferzetti: Valerio, Alice's father
- Carmen Scarpitta: Irene, Alice's mother
- Miguel Bosé: Humberto, Alice's boyfriend
