= Rena Niehaus =

German actress (born 1954)

- Born: 18 December 1954 (age 71)

Rena Niehaus (born 18 December 1954) is a German film actress.

Born in Oldenburg, Rena Niehaus was a minor star in 1970s Italian genre cinema, also appearing in several important "auteur" films such as Alberto Lattuada's Cuore di cane and Eriprando Visconti's La Orca and later, Oedipus Orca.

== Filmography ==
- Cuore di cane, directed by Alberto Lattuada (1975)
- I baroni, directed by Giampaolo Lomi (1975)
- La Orca, directed by Eriprando Visconti (1976)
- Oedipus Orca, directed by Eriprando Visconti (1977)
- Il maestro di violino, directed by Giovanni Fago (1976)
- Un amore targato Forlì, directed by Riccardo Sesani (1976)
- Una donna di seconda mano, directed by Pino Tosini (1977)
- Nero veneziano, directed by Ugo Liberatore (1978)
- Voglia di donna, directed by Franco Bottari (1978)
- Ciao cialtroni!, directed by Danilo Massi Rossini (1979)
- Arabella l'angelo nero, directed by Stelvio Massi (1989)
- Il ritmo del silenzio (1993)
