= A Milanese Story =

- Directed by: Eriprando Visconti
- Written by: Renzo Russo; Vittorio Sermonti; Eriprando Visconti
- Cinematography: Lamberto Caimi
- Music by: John Lewis
- Release date: 1962
- Country: Italy
- Language: Italian

A Milanese Story (Italian: Una storia milanese) is a 1962 Italian drama film. It is the directorial debut of Eriprando Visconti.

For his performance Romolo Valli won the Nastro d'Argento for Best Supporting Actor.

== Cast ==
- Enrique Thibaut as Giampiero Gessner
- Danièle Gaubert as Valeria
- Romolo Valli as Mr. Gessner
- Lucilla Morlacchi as Francesca Gessner
- Regina Bianchi as Valeria's mother
- Ermanno Olmi as Turchi
