= Lamberto Caimi =

Italian cinematographer

- Born: October 30, 1930 (age 95); Milan, Italy
- Occupation: Cinematographer

Lamberto Caimi (born 30 October 1930) is an Italian cinematographer.

Born in Milan, Caimi began his career in the field of documentary filmmaking industry; in 1955 he joined the film department of the company Edison, where he met Ermanno Olmi, for which he was the cinematographer in some dozens of short documentary films shot between the second half of the fifties and the early sixties. In 1961 he signed the cinematography of the first real feature film of Olmi, Il Posto, for which he realized "a rough and essential black and white", which was paired by critics to the Nouvelle Vague style.

During his career Laimi worked to films of different genres, often characterized from having Milan as set, including Eriprando Visconti's film debut A Milanese Story, Duccio Tessari's noir film Death Occurred Last Night, Umberto Lenzi's poliziottesco Gang War in Milan, Carlo Lizzani's Storie di vita e malavita and Renato Pozzetto's directorial debut Saxofone. He also collaborated several times with Alberto Lattuada.
