= Prisoner of Passion =

- Directed by: Eriprando Visconti
- Screenplay by: Lisa Mopurgo; Eriprando Visconti
- Story by: Eriprando Visconti
- Produced by: Marcello D'Amico
- Starring: Michele Placido; Rena Niehaus; Flavio Bucci
- Cinematography: Blasco Giurato
- Edited by: Franco Arcalli
- Music by: Federico Monti Arduini
- Production company: Serena Film '75
- Distributed by: Variety Distribution
- Release date: 1976
- Running time: 101 minutes
- Country: Italy

Prisoner of Passion (Italian: La Orca) is an Italian film directed by Eriprando Visconti. The film was followed with the sequel Oedipus Orca.

== Cast ==
- Michele Placido: Michele
- Rena Niehaus: Alice
- Carmen Scarpitta: Irene, Alice's mother
- Lisa Morpurgo: Elisa
- Flavio Bucci: Gino
- Bruno Corazzari: Paolo

== Production ==
In reference to the scene in which Rena Niehaus has her vagina fingered explicitly by Michele Placido, the actress said she was not clear what the scene would be like because she couldn't speak Italian.

== Reception ==
From a contemporary review, David Badder wrote in the Monthly Film Bulletin that the film was "slowly paced and directed with no commitment to character or theme, it is difficult to detect any compelling motive behind Prisoner of Passion." Badder continued that "the sex scenes remain wholly unerotic because their premise, that Alice uses her worldliness to overcome and then exploit the innocent peasant, is insufficiently defined."
