= Deadly Chase (film) =

- Directed by: Franco Prosperi
- Screenplay by: Franco Cifferi
- Story by: Franco Bottari
- Produced by: Pino Burricchi
- Starring: Luc Merenda; Janet Agren
- Cinematography: Cristiano Pogany
- Edited by: Alberto Gallitti
- Music by: Lino Corsetti
- Production company: Holiday Cinematografica
- Distributed by: Nucleo Star
- Release date: 8 December 1978 (Italy)
- Running time: 95 minutes
- Country: Italy
- Box office: ₤443.627 million

Deadly Chase (Italian: Il commissario Verrazzano) is a 1978 Italian film directed by Franco Prosperi.

== Plot ==
Inspector Verrazzano is joined by the owner of an art gallery, Giulia Medici, who must investigate the death of her brother, whose case was filed a few months earlier as a suicide.

== Cast ==
- Luc Merenda: Inspector Verrazzano
- Janet Agren: Giulia Medici
- Luciana Paluzzi: Rosy
- María Baxa: Kora Verelli
- Patrizia Gori: Giorgia
- Daniele Dublino: Inspector Biagi
- Giacomo Rizzo: Brigadeer Baldelli
- Gloria Piedimonte: Giorgia
- Isarco Ravaioli: Alberto Volci aka The Baron
- Chris Avram: Marco Verelli
- Attilio Dottesio: Notary Bruni

== Style ==
Despite the films aggressive title, Deadly Chase was described by Italian film historian Roberto Curti as a film that "moves away from out-and-out poliziotteschi and its worn out schems and moves closer to the melancholic, contemplative vein of film noir".

== Production ==
Deadly Chase was the second of two films directed by Franco Prosperi for producer Pino Buricchi in 1978. The film was shot at Incir de Paolis in Rome and in Nice.

== Release ==
Deadly Chase was distributed theatrically in Italy by Nucleo Star on 8 December 1978. The film grossed a total of 443,627,250 Italian lira. Italian film historian described this gross as poor, stating that the film was "evidence of Merenda's quick commercial decline as well as that of the genre itself"

== See also ==
- List of Italian films of 1978
