= Waves of Lust =

Waves Of Lust
- Directed by: Ruggero Deodato
- Screenplay by: Franco Bottari; Fabio Pittorru
- Story by: Gianlorenzo Battaglia; Lamberto Bava
- Produced by: Alberto Marras; Vincenzo Salviani
- Starring: Al Cliver; Silvia Dionisio; John Steiner; Elizabeth Turner
- Cinematography: Mario Capriotti
- Edited by: Franco Bottari
- Music by: Marcello Giombini
- Production company: T.D.L. Cinematografica
- Distributed by: Overseas Film Company
- Release date: 4 August 1975
- Running time: 88 minutes
- Country: Italy
- Language: Italian

Waves of Lust (Italian: Ondata di piacere, also known as A Wave of Pleasure) is a 1975 Italian erotic thriller drama film directed by Ruggero Deodato and starring John Steiner and Silvia Dionisio.

== Plot ==
Irem and Barbara are a young Italian couple on vacation in Sicily when they meet and are invited by a married and wealthy older couple named Giorgio and Silvia on board a yacht owned by Giorgio for a weekend of sailing and carefree time. Irem and Barbara soon become involved in Giorgio and Silvia's marital problems as Giorgio, a cynical and ruthless industrialist, verbally and physically abuses Silvia for his own twisted enjoyment to control her. Eventually, both Irem and Barbara become romantically involved with Silvia, leading to Giorgio to become more mentally unstable over his losing control over Silvia. It eventually leads to Giorgio killing Silvia in a jealous rage and pretending that it was an accident. Irem and Barbara then turn the tables on their host when they murder Giorgio by getting him drunk one evening during dinner and drowning him to make it look like a scuba diving accident. The young couple then sails away on the late Giorgio's yacht to enjoy the rest of their carefree vacation.

== Cast ==
- Al Cliver as Irem
- Silvia Dionisio as Barbara
- John Steiner as Giorgio
- Elizabeth Turner as Silvia

== See also ==
- List of Italian films of 1975
