= Damned in Venice =

- Directed by: Ugo Liberatore
- Written by: Ottavio Alessi; Ugo Liberatore
- Produced by: Luigi Borghese; Armando Todaro
- Starring: Renato Cestiè; Rena Niehaus; Yorgo Voyagis; José Quaglio; Olga Karlatos; Lorraine De Selle; Ely Galleani
- Cinematography: Alfio Contini
- Edited by: Alberto Gallitti
- Music by: Pino Donaggio
- Release date: 1978
- Country: Italy
- Language: Italian

Damned in Venice (Italian: Nero veneziano, literally "Venetian Black") is an Italian horror film directed in 1978 by Ugo Liberatore.

== Plot ==
Mark is a nice, young, blond teenage boy, who's blind and, as of recently, is suffering from disturbing visions. He lives with his cold, beautiful, older, blonde sister Christine and their strict, religious grandmother. When the grandmother dies in a freak accident caused accidentally by Mark, he and Christine go to live in a rundown hotel in Venice owned by their sickly aunt and depressed uncle. When the aunt dies, the uncle kills himself and the kids are left to their own devices. Christine takes charge and turns the place into a successful brothel. Then she suddenly becomes pregnant even though she's supposedly still a virgin. She also becomes meaner and meaner to the point of sadism towards Mark. Mark fears that all this has something to do with a disturbing vision he had about the birth of the Antichrist. Mark finds an ally in Giorgio, an artist and Christine's ex-boyfriend. They try to find out more about the mysterious hotel guest who calls himself Dan and who might be the father of Christine's child. Meanwhile, a local catholic priest, Father Stefani, becomes interested in Christine. Can Mark stop the Apocalypse or is he just an unwitting pawn in the devil's endgame?

== Cast ==
- Renato Cestiè : Mark
- Rena Niehaus : Christine
- Yorgo Voyagis : Dan
- Fabio Gamma : Giorgio
- José Quaglio : Father Stefani
- Olga Karlatos : Madeleine Winters / Vicky's Mother / Midwife
- Lorraine De Selle : Christine's Friend
- Ely Galleani : Christine's Friend
- Angela Covello : Christine's Friend
- Florence Barnes : Christine's Friend
- Bettine Milne : Grandmother
- Tom Felleghy : Martin Winters

== See also ==
- List of Italian films of 1978
