= Magnet of Doom =

- Directed by: Jean-Pierre Melville
- Written by: Jean-Pierre Melville; Georges Simenon (novel)
- Based on: L'Aîné des Ferchaux; 1945 book by Georges Simenon
- Produced by: Charles Lumbroso
- Starring: Jean-Paul Belmondo; Charles Vanel; Stefania Sandrelli
- Cinematography: Henri Decaë
- Edited by: Monique Bonnot; Claude Durand
- Music by: Georges Delerue
- Distributed by: UFA-Cormacico
- Release date: 1963 (France)
- Running time: 102 min
- Countries: France; Italy
- Language: French
- Box office: 1,484,948 admissions (France)

Magnet of Doom (French: L'Aîné des Ferchaux, "The Elder Ferchaux"), also known as An Honorable Young Man, is a 1963 French noir film, directed by Jean-Pierre Melville, based on the novel of the same title by Georges Simenon.

== Synopsis ==
In Paris the young ex-paratrooper and would-be boxer Michel Maudet loses his first big fight and is sacked by his manager. Needing a job, he answers an ad for a male secretary able to travel and is hired on the spot by Dieudonné Ferchaux, senior partner of a failing bank who has a criminal past. Without telling his girl friend Lina, whom he leaves penniless, that night he flies with Ferchaux to New York. Next morning, Ferchaux is able to collect millions of dollars from his safe-deposit box but cannot touch his US bank account because the French authorities are seeking his extradition. He has more money in Caracas, but doesn't want to go there yet. Hiring a car, he and Maudet drive by back roads to Louisiana, shadowed by immigration agents. He makes a stop at the birthplace of Frank Sinatra, in Hoboken.

Along the way, Ferchaux tells him men can be either sheep, leopards, or jackals. He's impressed when Maudet plays a Sinatra song on a diner jukebox, two G.I.s come in and change it to an Elvis Presley song, and Maudet knocks them both down, and puts 'Frankie-boy' back on. But as the trip continues, Maudet becomes more and more dominant, stopping the car against Maudet's orders, to pick up a pretty blonde hitchhiker he has a brief fling with. Ferchaux realizes he must be on guard against Maudet, but grows increasingly dependent upon him. It's made clear to Maudet, by the immigration agents, that Ferchaux has no chance of escaping to Venezuela, and Maudet himself may have to stay in America for some time.

Renting an isolated house in New Orleans, Ferchaux seems to fall sick and Maudet gets increasingly frustrated at the whims of an old man with no power left beyond his attaché case of dollars. Going to the neighborhood bar for drink and company, Maudet mentions his boss's stash to the owner Jeff, a reputed crook and murderer, and then picks up a dancer Lou in a night club. Deciding he would rather be with her, he takes Ferchaux's case of money but something makes him go back with it to the house, where Jeff and an accomplice are trying to rob Ferchaux, who fights back ferociously. Though Maudet routs the villains, Ferchaux has been knifed and dies in his arms--the case of money seems to be gone. With his last breath Ferchaux urges Maudet to take his key, which will open another safe-deposit box full of dollars in Venezuela, but Maude tells him he and his key can go to hell.

== Production ==
Jean-Pierre Melville cast Spencer Tracy as Dieudonné Ferchaux, but the actor fell ill. Melville offered the part to Charles Boyer. Though tempted, Boyer opted to make his London stage debut in Terrence Rattigan's Man and Boy.

Some scenes were shot on location in the U.S. However, the two lead actors were filmed in France. It was Melville's first feature film shot in color and Franscope.

== Cast ==
- Jean-Paul Belmondo: Michel Maudet
- Charles Vanel: Dieudonné Ferchaux
- Michèle Mercier: Lou, the dancer
- Ewa Swann (credited as Malvina Silberberg: Lina, the Parisian
- Stefania Sandrelli: Angie, the hitchhiker
- Andrex: M. Andréi
- André Certes: Émile Ferchaux

== Release ==
Magnet of Doom was released in France in 1963. It was also shown at the inaugural New York Film Festival in Philharmonic Hall.

The film was released as An Honorable Young Man on DVD by Video Dimensions.

== Reception ==
The film was well received in France. It cemented Melville's status in the pantheon of French auteurs. Cahiers du Cinéma praised the superficiality of Melville's film, relying on appearances to say what it wants. The reviewer compared Melville's eye to Claude Monet, concluding "[Melville] knows how to detect the essential...he is a terribly demanding spectator".

John Simon of The New Leader saw Magnet of Doom at the New York Film Festival. He dismissed the film as 'more than usually trashy Simenon turned into a would-be thriller, with Belmondo perpetuating his irresistible, smilingly evil, stereotyped self'. Melville's depiction of America was seen as anachronistic. The relationship between Maudet and Ferchaux has been described as homoerotic, a common trait of Melville's films. Magnet of Doom has been described as a "mood piece" where "Very little actually happens in the film, other than the ambience: seedy, squalid, aimless, listless, stirred by Michel’s discontent, boredom and sexual longing."

When Bertrand Tavernier disparaged the film to Melville, the director responded, "It's my best movie". He once remarked that it was his most personal film and that it could serve as his will if he were to disappear. At the Institut des hautes études cinématographiques in 1964, Melville lectured about the importance of set design and art direction using scenes from the film as demonstrations.

The pilgrimage to Frank Sinatra's birthplace and the "hypnotic car rides" in the film are seen as the most emblematic of Melville's "mystical Americanophilia".
