= Il Posto =

1961 Italian film

Il posto
- US DVD cover
- Directed by: Ermanno Olmi
- Written by: Ettore Lombardo; Ermanno Olmi
- Produced by: Alberto Soffientini
- Starring: Loredana Detto; Sandro Panseri
- Cinematography: Lamberto Caimi
- Edited by: Carla Colombo
- Music by: Pier Emilio Bassi
- Production companies: Titanus; The 24 Horses
- Distributed by: Titanus
- Release dates: 1961 (Venice Film Festival); 22 October 1963 (New York)
- Running time: 97 minutes (restored version)
- Country: Italy
- Language: Italian (and Lombard)

Il posto, English titles The Job or The Sound of Trumpets, is a 1961 Italian comedy-drama film directed by Ermanno Olmi, his second feature film. Screened at the 1961 Venice Film Festival, it received numerous national and international awards. In 2008, the film was included in the Italian Ministry of Cultural Heritage's 100 Italian films to be saved, a list of 100 films that "have changed the collective memory of the country between 1942 and 1978."

== Plot ==
Domenico forgoes the latter part of his education, because the family has chosen his younger brother to take up studies. Applying for a job at a big city corporation, he goes through a series of exams, physical tests and interviews. During a brief respite from the tests, he meets Antonietta, a young girl who has similarly forgone her schooling to earn money to support herself and her mother. Through the course of this meeting, they have coffee at a local cafe and shyly discuss their ambitions and lives. Domenico is attracted to her, but they are quickly separated when they land jobs in different departments.

A superior informs Domenico that although he passed the tests, no clerical positions are available; he agrees to take a job as a messenger in the meantime. He is instructed by employee Sartori, who works next to the accountants' office. Trying to find Antonietta, Domenico sees her one day, leaving the building among two other young men. He does not approach her, but later bumps into her during his errands. She invites him to join her at a New Year's Eve party held for the workers, which he decides to attend later in the evening.

Arriving at the party realising Antonietta's absence, he accepts the invitation of an older couple to sit with them. He observes the other guests dancing and having fun, while he remains silently in the company of the couple. When an older woman asks him to dance, he is hesitant at first, but later accepts her invitation, drinking and joining in the party. The night culminates in a simple and free dance in which all the guests participate.

When Domenico returns to work, he is offered the vacated desk of recently deceased employee Portioli of the accountants' department. Before being able to settle into the desk, however, the older staff move up in the rank order, forcing him to take a dimly lit desk in the last row.

== Cast ==
- Loredana Detto as Antonietta Masetti
- Sandro Panseri as Domenico Cantoni
- Tullio Kezich as examiner
- Guido Spadea as Portioli
- Mara Revel
- Guido Chiti
- Bice Melegari
- Corrado Aprile

== Release ==
Il posto opened in New York on 22 October 1963 under the title The Sound of Trumpets. Failing to find an audience on its initial release, it was given a re-release in January the following year on the occasion of the release of Olmi's follow-up film The Fiancés.

== Reception ==
On review aggregator website Rotten Tomatoes, the film holds an approval rating of 100% based on 10 reviews, with an average rating of 7.3/10.

== Awards ==
- British Film Institute Awards: Sutherland Trophy, 1961
- Venice Film Festival: OCIC Award, Italian Film Critics Award, Città di Imola Award, 1961
- David di Donatello Awards: Best Director Ermanno Olmi, 1962
- Valladolid International Film Festival: Spiga d'oro Award, 1962

== Legacy ==
Il posto was restored by the Cineteca di Bologna Foundation and Titanus in 2018 and selected to be screened in the Venice Classics section at the 75th Venice International Film Festival.
