= The Fiances =

The Fiancés
- Italian film poster
- Directed by: Ermanno Olmi
- Written by: Ermanno Olmi
- Produced by: Goffredo Lombardo
- Starring: Carlo Cabrini; Anna Canzi
- Cinematography: Lamberto Caimi
- Edited by: Carla Colombo
- Music by: Gianni Ferrio
- Production companies: Titanus; Sicilia S.P.A.; 22 Dicembre Cin.ca
- Distributed by: Titanus
- Release dates: 1963 (Italy); September 1963 (New York)
- Running time: 77 min
- Country: Italy
- Language: Italian

The Fiancés (Italian: I fidanzati) is a 1963 Italian drama film written and directed by Ermanno Olmi. It tells the story of a young Milanese worker who moves to Sicily for a job, leaving behind his long-time fiancée. The film was shown in competition at the 1963 Cannes Film Festival.

== Plot ==
Giovanni, a factory welder in Milan, has been offered a job by his superiors in Sicily with the prospect of a promotion. He accepts the offer and flies off to Sicily for eight months, while leaving behind his longtime fiancée Liliana (who resents his relocation). Giovanni also leaves behind his elderly father, who lives in an adjacent quarter. As he stays in a hotel, during the night, Giovanni walks about the area in loneliness while constantly thinking about Liliana. As he watches television in the lounge, he is told to report to the factory plant tomorrow morning.

The next morning, Giovanni takes a bus to the factory plant. When he arrives, he is handed his employee identification card. After a day's work, Giovanni wanders aimlessly about several locations. After a while, he exchanges candid and emotional letters with Liliana. She is still upset over Giovanni's relocation, but as their exchange continues, Liliana expresses that their physical distance has re-awakened the love in their habitual relationship.

On a Sunday, Giovanni phones Liliana before he heads back to work. He wants her to write back, and promises to call her next week. As it rains, Giovanni waits for the bus.

== Cast ==
- Carlo Cabrini as Giovanni
- Anna Canzi as Liliana

== Release ==
The Fiancés was screened in May 1963 at the Cannes Film Festival and in September the same year at the first New York Film Festival.

== Reception ==
In his May 1963 review for Il Giorno, Piero Bianchi titled The Fiancés "a subtle elegy, a work in a minor but accurate and profound tone", also commending Olmi's choice of the main actors.

Upon the film's regular cinema opening in New York in January 1964, Bosley Crowther of The New York Times certified Olmi "a remarkable ability to make images speak" and The Fiancés a "profound agitation of mood", but also pointed out a lack of "large-scale social comment and implications of irony" which he had found in the director's earlier The Sound of Trumpets.

On review aggregator website Rotten Tomatoes, the film holds an approval rating of 100% based on 5 reviews.

== Legacy ==
The Fiancés was screened as part of retrospectives at the Berlin International Film Festival in 2002, at the Harvard Film Archive in 2015, and repeatedly at the Cinémathèque française.

== Awards ==
- 1963 OCIC Award at the Cannes Film Festival
