= Voglia di donna =

1978 film by Franco Bottari

- Directed by: Franco Bottari
- Written by: Franco Bottari
- Produced by: Vincenzo Salviani
- Starring: Laura Gemser; Rena Niehaus
- Cinematography: Maurizio Gennaro
- Music by: Ubaldo Continiello
- Release date: 1978
- Language: Italian

Voglia di donna (i.e. "Desire of a woman") is a 1978 commedia sexy all'italiana film written and directed by Franco Bottari. It consists of three segments starring Laura Gemser, Rena Niehaus, and Ilona Staller.

== Plot ==
Bruno and his young African wife have fun recording their lovemaking on camera and then watching it afterwards. However, for some mysterious technical reason, their recording is broadcast to their entire building and their neighbors become their spectators.

Luisa cheats on her husband with a mature lawyer for which she is working as a secretary and tries to evade his attempts to expose her affair. The wife and her husband are arguing while they are driving and also while they are having coffee in a shop. He is accusing her of cheating with her boss while she is denying it. When he drops her off at her boss' office (which is also his home so he has a bed in there), she takes her clothes off immediately right after entering the door, joins her boss in his bed and has sex with him.

Gesuino, with the help of a mad scientist, is able to have an amorous encounter with the celebrity Cicciolina.

== Cast ==
- Laura Gemser as Princess
- Rena Niehaus as Luisa
- Ilona Staller as Cicciolina
- Gianni Cavina as Gesuino
- Carlo Giuffrè as Caimano
- Gabriele Tinti as Bruno
- Stefano Amato as Paolo's Friend
- Luciano Salce as The Fool
- Armando Brancia as The Priest
- Mauro Vestri as Pisellino

== See also ==
- List of Italian films of 1978
