= Lips of Lurid Blue =

- Directed by: Giulio Petroni
- Written by: Franco Bottari; Giulio Petroni
- Starring: Lisa Gastoni; Corrado Pani
- Cinematography: Gábor Pogány
- Music by: Ennio Morricone
- Release date: 1975
- Language: Italian

Lips of Lurid Blue (Italian: Labbra di lurido blu, also known as With Lips of Lurid Blue and With Lips of Filthy Blue) is a 1975 erotic drama film written and directed by Giulio Petroni.

== Plot ==
Traumatised when they were children - she by the erotic effusions of her parents, he by a repulsive experience of sexual initiation built by the fathers - Elli has become a nymphomaniac, and Marco a homosexual. Perhaps to find a way out from their deviations, perhaps to support each other, the two marry. Their marriage, however, does not solve their problems, nor are things made any easier by the unexpected return of George, the English antiquarian "friend" of Marco, who now tries to seduce Marco. Marco kills the girl who loves him, whom he has rejected, and then throws himself from a tower, under the eyes of Elli and George.

== Cast ==
- Lisa Gastoni as Elli Alessi
- Corrado Pani as Marco
- Jeremy Kemp as George Stevens, Marco's Lover
- Pino Caruso as Don Gino
- Hélène Chanel as Elli's Mother
- Silvano Tranquilli as David Levi
- Daniela Halbritter as Laura
- Gino Santercole as Alberto

== Production ==
The film was shot in Perugia.
