= Walking, Walking =

1983 film

- Directed by: Ermanno Olmi
- Written by: Ermanno Olmi
- Starring: Alberto Fumagalli
- Cinematography: Gianni Maddaleni; Ermanno Olmi
- Edited by: Ermanno Olmi
- Music by: Bruno Nicolai
- Release date: 12 May 1983
- Running time: 171 minutes
- Country: Italy
- Language: Italian

Walking, Walking (Italian: Cammina, cammina, and also known as Keep Walking) is a 1983 Italian drama film directed by Ermanno Olmi. It was screened out of competition at the 1983 Cannes Film Festival.

== Cast ==
- Alberto Fumagalli - Mel
- Antonio Cucciarrè - Rupo
- Eligio Martellucci - Kaipaco
- Renzo Samminiatesi - Shepher
- Marco Bartolini - Cushi
- Lucia Peccianti
- Guido Del Testa
- Tersilio Ghelardini
- Adolfo Fanucci
- Fernando Guarguaglini - Arupa
- Anna Vanni - Arupa's partner
- Giulio Paradisi - Astioge
- Rosanna Cuffaro
- Simone Migliorini - Eramo
- Stefano Ghelardini
