= The Circumstance =

1973 Italian Film

- Italian: La Circostanza
- Directed by: Ermanno Olmi
- Screenplay by: Ermanno Olmi
- Cinematography: Elvidio Burattini
- Edited by: Ermanno Olmi
- Production company: RAI
- Distributed by: Italnoleggio Cinematografico
- Release date: 1974 (Italy)
- Running time: 96
- Country: Italy
- Language: Italian

The Circumstance (Italian: La Circostanza) is a 1973 Italian drama film written, directed and edited by Ermanno Olmi. The film was screened at the 1974 San Sebastián International Film Festival, where it received a special mention.

== Plot ==
Laura, a lawyer who comes from an upper-class Milanese family, leads an altogether placid life. After witnessing an almost-fatal motorcycle accident near her family's country home, she becomes obsessed with the young victim, leading to a series of flashbacks and introspective instants that probe the bourgeois life she leads.

== Cast ==
- Ada Savelli as Laura
- Raffaella Bianichi as Silvia, Laura's daughter
- Gaetano Porro as Laura's husband
- Massimo Tabak as Tommaso, Laura's second son
- Mario Sireci as Beppe, Laura's eldest son
- Barbara Pezzuto as Anna, Beppe's wife

== Reception ==
Critic Derek Elley titled The Circumstance a "romantic highpoint in Olmi's oeuvre" and "his most accomplished piece of work."

== Legacy ==
The Circumstance was screened at Film at Lincoln Center in 2019 as part of a retrospective on Olmi's work.
