= One Fine Day (1968 film) =

1968 Italian Film

One Fine Day (Italian: Un certo giorno) is a 1968 Italian drama film written and directed by Ermanno Olmi. The film played at the 1969 New York Film Festival.

== Plot ==
Bruno, a Milanese advertising executive, kills an old peasant while en route to a company meeting. As he awaits his trial, the middle-aged man's life unfolds in a series of flashbacks, where he probes his relationships with his wife, his mistress, his employees, and his old boss, whose job he has just acquired.

== Cast ==
- Brunetto Del Vita as Bruno
- Lidia Fuortes as interviewer
- Vitaliano Damieli as counselor
- Giovanna Caresca as account executive
- Rafaele Modugno as art director
- Maria Crosignani as Elena, wife of Bruno
