= Franco Bottari =

Italian film director and screenwriter (1925–1988)

- Born: 5 September 1925; Caserta, Italy
- Died: 4 January 1988 (aged 62)
- Occupations: Director; Screenwriter; Set designer

Franco Bottari (5 September 1925 – 4 January 1988) was an Italian set designer, screenwriter and film director.

== Life and career ==
Born in Caserta, Bottari entered the film industry in 1959 as a set decorator. In 1963 he started an intense career as a costume and set designer, being mainly active in genre films. Occasionally, Bottari also collaborated on screenplays and in 1972 he made his directorial debut with the political drama Guernica (also known as 24 ore... non un minuto di più). Bottari died on 4 January 1988, at the age of 62.

== Selected filmography ==
Director and screenwriter

- Guernica (1972)
- Voglia di donna (1978)
- La vedova del trullo (1979)

Screenwriter

- The Young, the Evil and the Savage (1968)
- Lips of Lurid Blue (1975)
- Waves of Lust (1975)
- Colt 38 Special Squad (1976)
- Deadly Chase (1978)
