= Ermanno Olmi =

Italian film director and screenwriter (1931–2018)

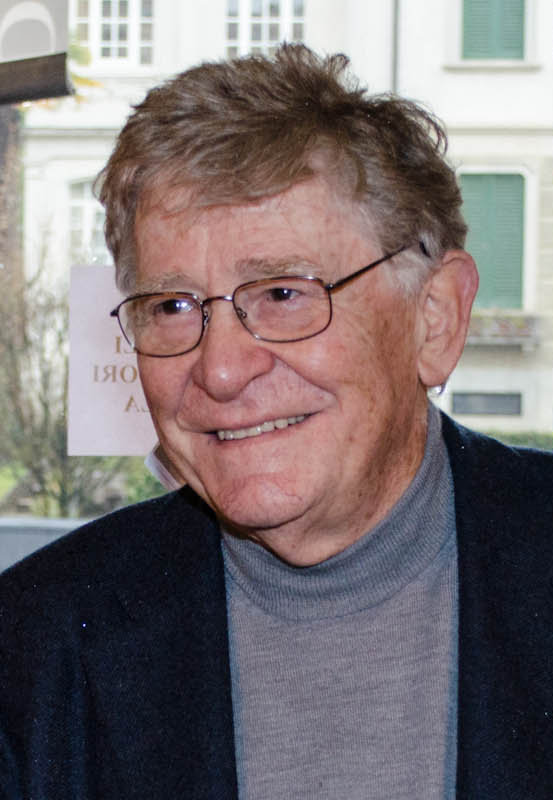
- Olmi in 2013
- Born: 24 July 1931; Bergamo, Italy
- Died: 7 May 2018 (aged 86); Asiago, Italy
- Occupations: Film director Screenwriter; Cinematographer; Film editor
- Years active: 1953–2018

Ermanno Olmi (24 July 1931 – 7 May 2018) was an Italian film director and screenwriter best known for directing Il Posto (1961) and The Tree of Wooden Clogs (1977), which won the Palme d'Or. Throughout his career Olmi blended Italian neorealism with Christian humanism, with many of his films following humble characters through the spiritual trials of harsh conditions.

== Early life ==
Olmi was born to a working-class Catholic family in Bergamo, in the Lombardy region in northern Italy, and raised in nearby Treviglio.

When Olmi was three years old, his family moved to Milan, where his parents found work with the utility company Edison-Volta. At age 16, Olmi began working there as a messenger. Olmi was initially interested in architecture, but was inspired to pursue cinema by the works of Roberto Rossellini. He began taking art classes and convinced Edison-Volta to start a documentary division. As head of the new division, Olmi made as many as 40 corporate documentaries.

Olmi's first feature film, Time Stood Still began as a corporate documentary about a hydroelectric dam.

== Career ==
Olmi's first scripted film was the acclaimed Il Posto, which follows a young man entering corporate life. Parts of the story were drawn from Olmi's experiences working in Milan. The film starred non-professional actor Loredana Detto, who Olmi later married.

Following from his humble start in corporate documentaries, Olmi typically helmed minimal productions, often writing, directing, filming, and editing the films himself.

Perhaps his best known film is The Tree of Wooden Clogs (L'Albero degli zoccoli), which was awarded the Palme d'Or at the 1978 Cannes Film Festival. The film drew heavily on Olmi's grandmother's stories about peasant life in agricultural regions of Italy. In 1983 his film Walking, Walking was screened out of competition at Cannes. In 1988, his La leggenda del santo bevitore (The Legend of the Holy Drinker), based on the novella by Joseph Roth and starring Rutger Hauer, won the Golden Lion at the Venice Film Festival as well as a David di Donatello award.

In 1982, Olmi founded Ipotesi Cinema, a film school in the village of Bassano del Grappa.

His The Profession of Arms (Il mestiere delle armi) also won a David di Donatello award.

== Awards ==
- 1978: Palme d'Or for The Tree of Wooden Clogs
- 1988: Golden Lion for The Legend of the Holy Drinker
- 2004: Leopard of Honour
- 2008: Honorary Golden Lion

=== David di Donatello ===
- 1962: Best Director for Il Posto
- 1989: Best Director for The Legend of the Holy Drinker
- 2002: Best Director for The Profession of Arms

=== Nastro d'Argento ===
- 1979: Best Director for The Tree of Wooden Clogs
- 1989: Best Director for The Legend of the Holy Drinker

== Filmography ==
- Time Stood Still (1959)
- Il Posto (1961)
- The Fiances (1963)
- A Man Named John (1965)
- One Fine Day (1968)
- In the Summertime (1971)
- The Circumstance (1973)
- The Tree of Wooden Clogs (1978)
- Walking, Walking (1983)
- Long Live the Lady! (1987)
- The Legend of the Holy Drinker (1988)
- The Secret of the Old Woods (1993)
- Genesis: The Creation and the Flood (1994)
- The Profession of Arms (2001)
- Singing Behind Screens (2003)
- One Hundred Nails (2007)
- The Cardboard Village (2011)
- Greenery Will Bloom Again (2014)

== Legacy ==
Olmi has been the subject of many retrospectives. In 2019, the Austrian Film Museum conducted a complete retrospective of Olmi's work (excluding only his short films) – together with the films of Federico Fellini – in collaboration with the Cineteca Nazionale and the "Istituto Italiano di Cultura di Vienna".

Also in 2019, Film at Lincoln Center honored Olmi with a two-week retrospective. The series was co-produced by Istituto Luce Cinecittà and presented in association with the Ministry of Culture of Italy. The films then traveled to Cleveland, where the Cleveland Institute of Art Cinematheque hosted a seven-part retrospective.

In 2008 he received the Honorary Golden Lion at the Venice Film Festival. He had turned down the same award in 2004, feeling that it would have signified a premature end to his career.

== Personal life ==
In 1959, Olmi moved to the Asiago plateau, where he would live for the rest of his life. Olmi led a relatively simple life away from the spotlight of the film industry, only rarely sitting for interviews and keeping no copies of his films. Olmi reportedly hesitated to travel by air.

In 1963 Olmi married Loredana Detto, who had played Antonietta Masetti in his film Il Posto (1961). The couple had 3 children; Fabio, Elisabetta, and Andrea.

Olmi died on 7 May 2018 in Asiago. His death was mourned by then Prime Minister Paolo Gentiloni as well as director Martin Scorsese.
