= Eriprando Visconti =

Italian film director, screenwriter, and producer

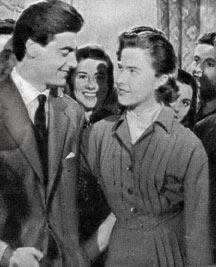

Eriprando Visconti di Modrone, Count of Vico Modrone (September 24, 1932 – May 26, 1995) was an Italian film director, screenwriter, and producer. He was the nephew of the more famous Luchino Visconti.

Born in Milan into a noble family, in the early 1950s Visconti moved to Rome, against the wishes of his family, to pursue his dream to enter the cinema industry. After a few experiences as an actor and an assistant film editor under Mario Serandrei, he wrote an early draft of the script and collaborated on the screenplay of Francesco Maselli's The Abandoned in 1955. In the second half of the 1950s he started working as assistant director, notably collaborating with Michelangelo Antonioni and his uncle Luchino Visconti. In 1959, he collaborated with Luigi Malerba to the libretto of the Franco Mannino's opera Hatikwa, and in the same period he started working in theatre as an assistant director.

Visconti made his feature film debut in 1962, with A Milanese Story. During his career he alternated great commercial successes such as The Lady of Monza and unexpected bombs such as Il caso Pisciotta, as well as critical acclaims and failures. He launched the career of several actors, and generally preferred to not work with major established stars. His films were mainly independent and wholly or partly self-funded.

He was married to Princess Francesca Patrizia Ruspoli.

35mm copies of all his films, as well as screenplays and photographic material related to his career are held by the Cineteca Nazionale in Rome.
