= Marshalltown High School =

Public secondary school in Marshalltown, Iowa, United States

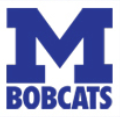

Location
- 1602 S. Second Ave; Marshalltown, Iowa 50158; United States
- 42.0297°N 92.9082°W

Information
- Type: Public high school
- School district: Marshalltown Community School District
- Superintendent: Theron Schuette
- Principal: Justin Boliver
- Teaching staff: 101.38 (FTE)
- Grades: 9–12
- Enrollment: 1,613 (2023-2024)
- Student to teacher ratio: 15.91
- Colors: Blue; Red
- Athletics conference: Iowa Alliance Conference
- Sports: Football; volleyball; swimming; cross country; golf; tennis; soccer; track; wrestling; bowling; e sports; softball; baseball; marching band; pep band
- Mascot: Bobby the Bobcat
- Team name: Bobcats
- Rival: Ames High Little Cyclones
- Newspaper: Pebbles
- Yearbook: Post Script
- Website: mhs.marshalltown.k12.ia.us/o/mhs

Marshalltown High School (MHS) is a public high school in Marshalltown, Iowa. It is home to 1,600 students in grades 9–12 as of the 2023-24 school year. It is a part of the Marshalltown Community School District.

The district, and therefore the high school, serves almost all of Marshalltown, Albion, and Haverhill.

== History ==
The first Marshalltown High School was located north of downtown Marshalltown on Grant Street before moving to the present Miller Middle School. In 1965, the present Marshalltown High School building opened and has experienced minor additions including a library, weight room, auditorium and classroom wings.

The Marshalltown High School athletics facilities include both outdoor and indoor sports accommodations. The outdoor facilities include baseball, football, soccer, and softball fields, as well as a track. The indoor facilities include a swimming pool, and a gymnasium, known as the "Roundhouse," which has accommodations for basketball, volleyball, wrestling, and track. All areas are served by concessions, restrooms, parking and men's and women's locker rooms.

The Roundhouse was renovated in 2015 to include additional sports locker rooms and the wooden bleachers were replaced with ADA-approved plastic bleachers. The MHS swimming pool area was also renovated to include windows to be able to view from the hallway and additional pool deck space.

The Marshalltown Court Complex, consisting of twelve tennis courts and three pickleball courts, was completed in October 2020 and is used by the Boys and Girls Tennis teams.

The Bobcats Sports Complex, which included a new synthetic turf field, new track, renovated bleacher and press box structure, new scoreboard and a renovated courtyard, was completed and opened in September 2023. A storm shelter, which will also include team rooms, is under construction.

== Activities ==
Students at Marshalltown High School have a wide array of co-curricular and extra-curricular activities to choose from, including athletics, National Honor Society, Key Club, music, speech, drama, foreign language clubs, color guard and cheer.

== Athletics ==
Marshalltown High School sports teams are known as the Bobcats; their uniforms display the school's colors of blue and red.

The school fields athletic teams in 21 sports including:

- Summer: Baseball and softball
  - Baseball (1964, 1976 Baseball State Champions)
- Fall: Football, volleyball, girls' swimming and diving, girls' cross country
  - Boys' cross country (6-time State Champions - 1976, 1979, 1981, 1982, 1984, 1986)
  - Boys' golf (5-time State Champions - 1958, 1959, 1960, 1979, 1980)
  - Volleyball (1994 State Champions)
- Winter: Boys' swimming, boys' bowling, girls' bowling
  - Boys' basketball (4-time State Champions - 1956, 1960, 1961, 1966)
  - Girls' basketball (1986 State Champions)
  - Wrestling (3-time State Champions - 1924, 1925, 1926)
  - Boys' bowling 2021 Class 3A State Champions
- Spring: Girls' track and field, boys' soccer, girls' soccer, boys' tennis, girls' tennis
  - Boys' track and field (1985 State Champions)
  - Girls' golf (4-time State Champions - 1994, 1995, 1996, 2005)

== Notable alumni ==
- Cap Anson, baseball player.
- George C. Armstrong, Illinois state senator, newspaper editor, and businessman.
- Jeff Clement, retired MLB player for the Pittsburgh Pirates and Seattle Mariners.
- John Mark Dean, conservationist and marine biologist
- Ina May Gaskin, 1958 graduate and the only midwife for whom an obstetric maneuver is named.
- Rick Glenn, professional Mixed Martial Artist, current UFC Featherweight.
- John Hurlburt (1898–1968), NFL player.
- Laurence C. Jones, 1903 graduate and educational innovator.
- Darwin Judge, 1974 graduate and United States Marine, one of the last two Americans killed in Vietnam on April 29, 1975
- Joseph Kosinski, 1992 graduate and film director, best known for Tron: Legacy, Oblivion, and Top Gun: Maverick.
- Modern Life is War, hardcore punk band.
- Coach Adolph Rupp began his coaching career with the Marshalltown wrestling team, leading them to a state championship during the 1925–26 school year.
- Jean Seberg (1938–1979), actress who starred in 34 films in Hollywood and in Europe, including Saint Joan, Bonjour Tristesse, Breathless, Lilith, Moment to Moment, A Fine Madness, Paint Your Wagon, Airport, Macho Callahan, and Gang War in Naples.
- Beulah Wheeler (1896–1971), 1915 graduate and attorney; University of Iowa School of Law's first female African-American graduate
- Peter Zeihan, 1992 graduate and geopolitical researcher, analyst, and writer.

== See also ==
- List of high schools in Iowa
