= From the Journals of Jean Seberg =

- Directed by: Mark Rappaport
- Starring: Jean Seberg; Mary Beth Hurt
- Release date: 1995
- Country: United States
- Language: English

From the Journals of Jean Seberg is a 1995 video essay on the life of actress Jean Seberg. It is directed by film essayist Mark Rappaport.

== Summary ==
Discussions about her multiple marriages, involvement with the Black Panther Party and subsequent investigation on her by the FBI (on the "journals" the director created) are featured alongside excerpts of her film roles are featured from her obscure debut in Otto Preminger's 1957 Saint Joan to her notable role in Jean-Luc Godard's 1960 acclaimed classic À bout de souffle. The fictional Seberg is played by actress Mary Beth Hurt.

== See also ==
- Rock Hudson's Home Movies
- French New Wave
