= Jean Seberg (musical) =

1983 musical by Julian Barry, Christopher Adler, and Marvin Hamlisch

Jean Seberg is a musical biography with a book by Julian Barry, lyrics by Christopher Adler, and music by Marvin Hamlisch. It is based on the life of the late American actress and premiered at the National Theatre in London on 1 December 1983.

== Background ==
Adler had almost completed a full draft with his current composer, Nathan Hurwitz, when his agent contacted him, asking about his interest in working with Hamlisch. Leaving Hurwitz for Hamlisch, several small sections of Hurwitz's music ultimately remained in the production at the National Theatre, uncredited.

The production underwent major problems and faced criticism during its developmental and rehearsal stages. The original choreographer was fired and two of the stars suffered ankle injuries. One of them was replaced, resulting in the opening being delayed. Supporters of the National Theatre were dismayed that it was staging the premiere of what was primarily an American musical, and rumors that it was a disaster spread through London.

In an interview with Stephen Holden of The New York Times, Hamlisch said, "A project like Jean seems awfully risky to a producer.… I have to keep reminding myself that A Chorus Line was initially considered weird and off the wall. It was A Chorus Line that convinced me that if you give an audience a theatrical moment, whether it's funny or mean or satiric, they'll accept it as long as it's theatrical. You mustn't underestimate an audience's intelligence."

== Overview ==
The plot covers Seberg's life and career from her first screen appearance in the 1957 Otto Preminger film Saint Joan followed by her acclaim in France prompted by her appearance in Breathless. Her support of the Black Panthers is shown, and her mysterious 1979 death in Paris at the age of forty. The main characters besides Seberg are J. Edgar Hoover, Otto Preminger and Romain Gary (Seberg's second husband).

== Production ==
Jean Seberg opened on 1 December 1983 at the Royal National Theatre, Olivier Theatre. Directed by Peter Hall, Kelly Hunter and Elizabeth Counsell were featured as the younger and older actress, respectively. The choreographer was Irving Davies, and sets, costumes and lighting were by John Bury.

== Critical response ==
In his review in the Daily Telegraph, John Barber described the musical as "a very big musical for someone who seems to have been a very small girl". Milton Shulman in the Evening Standard compared the songs to "penny whistles at a state funeral", while Robert Cushman of The Observer felt "Marvin Hamlisch's score is the best he has written for the theatre."

An article in the January 12, 1984 edition of The New York Times reported that the National, citing "disappointing reception by the critics" and poor box office, would close the show on April 4.
