= 'Way Out =

1961 American TV anthology series

- Title card
- Genre: Science fiction, horror
- Written by: Roald Dahl; Phil Reisman, Jr.; Irving Gaynor Neiman; Elliott Baker; Sumner Locke Elliott; Larry Cohen; Nicholas Pryor; Robert van Scoyk; Jerome Ross
- Directed by: Paul Bogart; Marc Daniels; Mel Ferber; Daniel Petrie; Seymour Robbie; Boris Sagal; William Corrigan; Paul Bosner
- Presented by: Roald Dahl
- Starring: Various guest stars
- Theme music composer: Otto Luening; Vladimir Ussachevsky; Tod Docksteader
- Composer: Robert Cobert
- Country of origin: United States
- Original language: English
- No. of seasons: 1
- No. of episodes: 14

Production
- Executive producer: David Susskind
- Producer: Jacqueline Babbin
- Production location: New York City
- Running time: 25 minutes
- Production company: Talent Associates

Original release
- Network: CBS
- Release: 31 March – 14 July 1961

'Way Out is a 1961 American horror, fantasy, and science fiction television anthology series hosted by writer Roald Dahl. The macabre black-and-white 25-minute shows were introduced by Dahl, his face projected in a disconcerting hall of mirrors effect, dryly delivering a brief introductory monologue, expounding on such unusual subjects as undertakers or frogs or murdering a romantic rival with ground tiger's whiskers.

== Origin ==
Barry Morse in "Soft Focus" on 'Way Out (July 7, 1961), makeup by Dick Smith

The taped series began as CBS replacement for a Jackie Gleason talk show that network executives were about to cancel. Producer David Susskind contacted Dahl to help mount a show quickly. The series was paired by the network with the similar The Twilight Zone for Friday evening broadcasts, running from March through July 1961 at 9:30 pm Eastern time. The show's primary sponsor was Liggett & Myers (L&M cigarettes). Writers included Larry Cohen and Sumner Locke Elliott.

The only adaptation from one of Dahl's own short stories was the premiere episode, "William and Mary", a tale of a wife's posthumous revenge on her husband's disembodied brain kept alive in a bowl. In "Dissolve to Black", an actress (Kathleen Widdoes) cast as a murder victim at a television studio goes through a rehearsal, but the drama merges with reality as she finds herself trapped on the show's near-deserted set. Other dramas offered startling imagery: a snake slithering up a carpeted staircase inside a suburban home, a headless woman strapped to an electric chair with a light bulb in place of her head ("Side Show"), and half of a man's face erased ("Soft Focus"). Roald Dahl's short story, "Skin", was purchased alongside "William and Mary", but the network decided the story was too gory for telecast, especially after they asked Susskind to not film the brain being kept alive in the jar and only suggest the brain off camera.

Actors on the series included Martin Balsam, Michael Conrad, Mildred Dunnock, Kathleen Widdoes, Murray Hamilton, Martin Huston, Henry Jones, Mark Lenard, Kevin McCarthy, John McGiver, Barry Morse, Richard Thomas, Doris Roberts, and Fritz Weaver.

Roald Dahl was initially hired to host the series for three consecutive episodes at a salary of $650 per episode. CBS contracted David Susskind to produce a total of 26 half-hour episodes. Roald Dahl informed Susskind that he only wanted to host the first three episodes to make enough money to pay for his son's medical bills. But Dahl ultimately loved the assignment and optioned to remain as host beyond the first three. Initial proposals was to have Dahl sitting on a rock, answering the telephone, filmed on location at Central Park. But the cold January weather and the costs involved resulted in the decision to film Dahl's intros in a studio.

Critical notices at the time were extremely good, especially for Dahl's wry commentaries, suffused with gallows humor. The program was sponsored by Liggett and Myers, makers of cigarettes. The sponsor insisted characters on the programs smoked the product to ensure product placement. In the episode "The Sisters", the entire cast not only smoked cigarettes but also emptied ash trays during the telecast. Dahl himself smoked a cigarette during his introductory remarks. When network affiliates were receiving complaints from concerned parents about the stories giving their children nightmares, stations (beginning with episode 11) decided to start dropping the program in favor of a 16mm syndicated stock program instead. When a network station in Philadelphia previewed a closed circuit telecast and later agreed the program should not air over their station, news of this spread across syndicated newspaper columns. Ultimately, the sponsor paid less per telecast with less network coverage, which resulted in the decision of the advertising agency (who represented the sponsor) to cancel the program after 14 telecasts.

The show was one of the last weekly dramatic television series produced in Manhattan. Only five episodes have ever turned up on [bootleg] videocassettes and DVDs; as of October 2016, however, 10 episodes were posted on YouTube. The entire run is available for viewing at the Paley Center for Media in New York City and Los Angeles. The episodes are owned by Susskind's estate.

Dahl later hosted an anthology series called Tales of the Unexpected on British television beginning in 1979.

In 1986, Filmfax Magazine published a two-part article by Gary Joseph and Martin H. Friedenthal documenting the history of the 'WAY OUT television program, along with an episode guide. The authors reviewed the 14 episodes at the Museum of Television and Radio.

== Episodes ==
No.	Title	Directed by	Written by	Original release date
1	"William and Mary"	Marc Daniels	Roald Dahl	March 31, 1961
starring: Henry Jones as William Pearl, Fritz Weaver as Dr. Landy, Mildred Dunnock as Mary Pearl, Barnard Hughes as Dr. Forster
2	"The Down Car"	Marc Daniels	Phil Reisman, Jr.	April 7, 1961
starring: Frank Overton as Nicholas Bayle, Collin Wilcox as Ellie, Bernie West as Mr. Alvord, Herbert Voland as The Superintendent, Larry Haines as The Radio Announcer, Ray Walston as John Ventry
3	"The Sisters"	Tom Donovan	Irving Gaynor Neiman	April 14, 1961
starring: Lois Smith as Louise, Carmen Matthews as Harriet, Paul Stevens as Paul, John Gibson as Uncle Robert
4	"Button, Button"	Tom Donovan	Elliott Baker	April 28, 1961
starring: Tim O'Connor as Captain Stone, Warren Finnerty as Sgt. Gee, William Traylor as 2nd Lt. Hubbard, Conrad Fowkes as Sgt. Burke, Sean Garrison as Specialist Willis, Lee Richardson as Canelli, Dick O'Neill as Sgt. Rockovitch
5	"I Heard You Calling Me"	Daniel Petrie	Sumner Locke Elliott	May 5, 1961
starring: Constance Ford as Freda Mansfield, Anthony Dawson as George Frobisher, Angela Thornton as Rose Thorn, George Turner as Mr. Burnly, Jean Cameron as The Operator, Neil Fitzgerald as The Doctor
6	"The Croaker"	Paul Bogart	Phil Reisman, Jr.	May 12, 1961
starring: John McGiver as Mr. Rana, Madeleine Sherwood as Cora Tench, Rex Everhart as Fred Tench, Paul E. Richards as Sgt. McGoogin, Richard Thomas as Jeremy
7	"False Face"	Paul Bogart	Larry Cohen	May 26, 1961
starring: Alfred Ryder as Michael Drake, Martin Brooks as The Face, Gerry Jedd as Rita Singer, Lester Rawlins as Fred Davis, Dana Elcar as The Flophouse Manager, Louise Larabee as The Waitress
8	"Dissolve to Black"	William Corrigan	Irving Gaynor Neiman	June 2, 1961
starring: Moultrie Patten as George, Kathleen Widdoes as Bonnie Day Crew, Richard Morse as Harry, Mark Lenard as Paul, Dan Morgan as Murderer Night Crew, James Patterson as Harry, Michael Conrad as Paul, Leonardo Cimino as Murderer Frank Daly as Victim
9	"Death Wish"	Boris Sagal	Irving Gaynor Neiman	June 9, 1961
starring: Don Keefer as George Atterbury, Charlotte Rae as Hazel Atterbury, Heywood Hale Broun as Mr. Petard, Chuck Morgan as Charon
10	"The Overnight Case"	Paul Bogart	Nicholas Pryor	June 16, 1961
starring: Barbara Baxley as The Woman, Kevin McCarthy as Dr. Paul Sandham, Martin Balsam as Bill Clayton, Leon B. Stevens as The Other Man, Helen Stenborg as Miss Wickford
11	"Hush Hush"	Mel Ferber	Bob Van Scoyk	June 23, 1961
starring: Philip Coolidge as Ernest Lydecker, Rosemary Murphy as Bernice Lydecker, Woodrow Parfrey as William Rogers, Nancy Cushman as Margaret Ainsley, Barry Newman as The Policeman, John F. Hamilton as The Superintendent
12	"Side Show"	Seymour Robbie	Elliott Baker	June 30, 1961
starring: Myron McCormick as The Barker, Murray Hamilton as Harold, Margaret Phillips as Cassandra, Doris Roberts as Edna, Martin Huston as Ronnie, Carolyn Groves as Betty
13	"Soft Focus"	Ron Winston	Phil Reisman, Jr.	July 7, 1961
starring: Barry Morse as Ronald Pell, Joan Hotchkis as Louise Pell, Mitch Ryan as Bill Fontaine, Dortha Duckworth as Mrs. Bickell, Anne Meacham as Dolly Granger
14	"20/20"	Paul Bosner	Jerome Ross	July 14, 1961
starring: Milton Selzer as Hervey, Ruth White as Stephanie, Frederick Rolf as Mr. Jellifer, Sudie Bond as Mrs. Jellifer, Tom Shirley as Huddleston

== Preservation ==
The episode "Button, Button" was preserved by the UCLA Film & Television Archive in collaboration with Paramount Pictures Archive and Wisconsin Center for Film and Theater Research (WCFTR) from 16mm kinescope picture and track negatives and a composite kinescope. Preservation funding was provided by the John H. Mitchell Television Preservation Endowment. The preserved episode screened at the 2024 UCLA Festival of Preservation.

== Sources ==
- Battaglio, Stephen (2010). David Susskind: A Televised Life, pp. 89–92. St. Martin's Press. ISBN 978-0-312-38286-5
