= Christopher Adler (lyricist) =

American lyricist

Christopher Edward Adler (17 January 1954 – 30 November 1984) was an American lyricist and theatre director. His best-known works were as a lyricist for the musical Jean Seberg and the show Shirley MacLaine on Broadway.

== Life and career ==
Adler was born in New York City, the son of composer and lyricist Richard Adler and his first wife Marion Hart. After their divorce in 1958, Marion took Christopher and his elder brother Andrew to live with her in London. When she died in the early 1960s, they returned to New York to live with their father and his second wife, Sally Ann Howes. Howes became their adoptive mother and remained close to Christopher throughout his life even after she and his father divorced in 1966. Adler graduated from Millbrook School in 1970 and then studied for a year at Lawrenceville School before attending his father's alma mater University of North Carolina at Chapel Hill. He graduated with honors in 1975 and during his time there directed 17 plays at the university's theatre.

He began his career in New York City with off-Broadway productions. In 1974 he directed Harold Pinter's Old Times at Lolly's Theater Club, and in 1977 wrote and directed White Piano, performed at Playwrights Horizons. White Piano was an adaptation of a 1974 account of Storyville, the red-light district of New Orleans. His first Broadway project was Herman van Veen: All of Him, a one-man show by the Dutch entertainer Herman van Veen for which Adler wrote the English lyrics. It opened at the Ambassador Theatre in December 1982.

His next project as a lyricist was the musical Jean Seberg with composer Marvin Hamlisch. Based on the life of Jean Seberg, the book by Julian Barry was in turn based on an original idea by Adler. Jean Seberg opened at the Olivier Theatre in London on 1 December 1983 and ran for 60 performances. He collaborated again with Hamlisch for Shirley MacLaine's revue Shirley MacLaine on Broadway which played in Las Vegas before opening at the Gershwin Theatre in New York on 19 April 1984 for a one-month run. Later that year MacLaine took the show to the Wilshire Theater in Los Angeles.

Adler died of AIDS-related cancer in November 1984 at the age of 30. Working from his bed at the Memorial Sloan Kettering Cancer Center, he completed the book and lyrics for Gideon Starr, a musical about a modern-day messiah. His father and brother Andrew each read a stanza from this final work at his memorial service in the Shubert Theatre.
