= Kill! Kill! Kill! Kill! =

1971 film directed by Romain Gary

- French theatrical release poster
- Directed by: Romain Gary
- Written by: Romain Gary
- Produced by: Alexander Salkind; Pierre Spengler; Dieter Geissler
- Starring: Stephen Boyd; Jean Seberg; James Mason; Curd Jürgens
- Cinematography: Edmond Richard
- Edited by: Roger Dwyre
- Music by: Berto Pisano; Memphis Slim; Doris Troy
- Production company: Barnabé Productions; Dieter Geissler Filmproduktion; Este Films; Industrie Cinematografiche Artistiche Romane; Procinex
- Distributed by: Cocinor (France)
- Release dates: 10 December 1971 (Paris, premiere); 25 January 1972 (France)
- Country: France; West Germany; Italy; Spain

Kill! Kill! Kill! Kill! (French: Police Magnum, also released as Kill!) is a 1971 action thriller film written and directed by Romain Gary, and starring Stephen Boyd, Jean Seberg, James Mason and Curd Jürgens.

== Plot ==
Stranded miles from civilizations in remote Afghanistan, Emily Hamilton, the young wife of a high-ranking Interpol official, owes her survival to the intervention of Brad Killian, a man willing to do anything to wipe out a drug trafficking gang. A full-blown war ensues, drawing Emily into a world of violence and corruption that will force her to realize her husband is not the incorruptible policeman he seemed to be.

== Cast ==
- Stephen Boyd as Brad Killian
- Jean Seberg as Emily Hamilton
- James Mason as Alan Hamilton
- Curd Jürgens as Grueningen
- Daniel Emilfork as Mejid
- Mauro Parenti as Cremona
- José María Caffarel as Algate
- Carlos Montoya as Ahmed
- Memphis Slim as himself
- Henri Garcin as Lawyer
- Víctor Israel as Baron
- Aldo Sambrell as Carcopino
- Luciano Pigozzi as Medina
- Cris Huerta as Nico Bizanthios
- Tito García as Spiros Bizanthios
- Dan van Husen as Bodyguard (uncredited)

== Reception ==
Kevin Thomas of the Los Angeles Times called it "totally ludicrous".

The French website SensCritique called it "part New Wave art film, part B-movie. Romain Gary attempted the impossible, failing completely by not appealing to either of the two audiences who are fans of either genre. The film is talky and disjointed. By the tenth minute, you no longer feel any empathy for the characters, and it's difficult to discern any real stakes in the plot. As for the ending, it feels like it came straight out of a parody or a blooper reel."
