= Mark Rappaport =

American film director

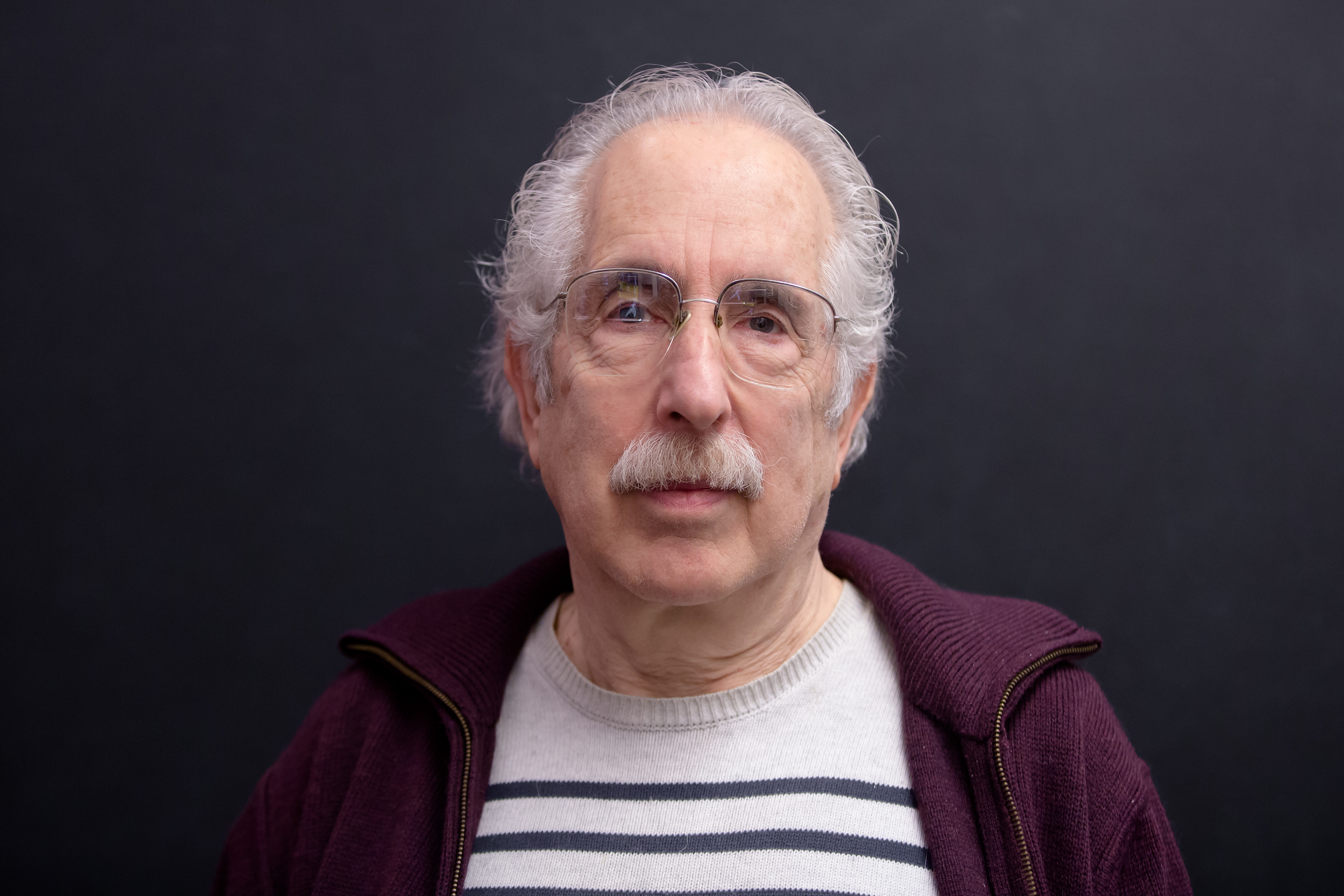
- Rappaport on 2015
- Born: January 15, 1942 (age 84); New York City, New York, U.S.
- Education: Brooklyn College (BA)
- Occupations: Film director, film critic
- Years active: 1966–present
- Notable work: Imposters (1979); Rock Hudson's Home Movies (1992); From the Journals of Jean Seberg (1995)

Mark Rappaport (born January 15, 1942, in New York City, United States) is an American independent/underground film director and film critic, who has been working since the 1960s.

== Biography ==
Born and raised in Brighton Beach, New York, Rappaport graduated from Brooklyn College in 1964 with a B.A. in literature. In 2005, he moved to Paris, France, where he resides and works.

Starting in 1966, Rappaport directed a number of short films and six low-budget features, all made independently with low budgets.

Rappaport’s first feature, Casual Relations (1974), was later described in The A.V. Club as “a formidable exercise in the narrative ambiguities that would dominate many of his films to come.” The next several years brought Mozart in Love (1975), Local Color (1977), the Max Ophuls-influenced The Scenic Route (1978), and Imposters (1979). Roger Ebert called the film “a witty and mannered exercise in style and social observation.” Rappaport’s last narrative feature was Chain Letters (1985).

In 1992, Rappaport began the second phase of his career, in which he moved from scripted narrative to the form of the video essay. The first of these was Rock Hudson's Home Movies, a documentary on Rock Hudson's homosexuality as seen through clips from his films. The same form was used for From the Journals of Jean Seberg (1995), in which actress Mary Beth Hurt spoke as Jean Seberg; and The Silver Screen: Color Me Lavender (1997), narrated by Dan Butler. Because of this work, critic Matt Zoller Seitz called Rappaport "the father of the modern video essay."

Starting in 2014, Rappaport turned to short video essays on film history, chronicling the careers of actors (Anita Ekberg, Marcel Dalio, Debra Paget, Chris Olsen, Conrad Veidt, Will Geer) and specific directors (Douglas Sirk, Max Ophuls, Sergei Eisenstein, Jacques Tati and Robert Bresson).

In May 2012, Rappaport filed a lawsuit against professor Ray Carney for refusing to return digital masters of his movies which the filmmaker had previously entrusted to Carney to transport to Paris. The suit was later dropped due to rising legal costs, and Rappaport started an online petition demanding that Carney return the masters.

In 1994, Rappaport started contributing to the French film journal Trafic, created by Serge Daney two years earlier. Since then, he has published more than 40 pieces, and several collections, including The Moviegoer Who Knew Too Much (2013) and (F)au(x)tobiographies (2013).

== Recognition ==
Rappaport has been noted by Roger Ebert, Jonathan Rosenbaum, Ray Carney, J. Hoberman, Dave Kehr, and Stuart Klawans.

== Filmography ==
Independent films (1966–1990)

- 1966 : Blue Frieze (short)
- 1966 : Mur 19 (short)
- 1967 : Friends (short)
- 1968 : Bay of Angels (short)
- 1968 : The Stairs (short)
- 1969 : Persepolis (short)
- 1970 : Chronicle (short)
- 1971 : Fluorescent (short)
- 1971 : Blue Streak (short)
- 1974 : Casual Relations
- 1975 : Mozart in Love
- 1977 : Local Color
- 1978 : The Scenic Route
- 1979 : Imposters
- 1980 : Mark Rappaport -- The TV Spin-off (short)
- 1985 : Chain Letters
- 1990 : Postcards (short)

Found footage films (1992–2002)

- 1992 : Rock Hudson's Home Movies
- 1993 : Exterior Night (short)
- 1995 : From the Journals of Jean Seberg
- 1997 : The Silver Screen : Color Me Lavender
- 2002 : John Garfield (short)

Video essays (2014–Present)

- 2014 : The Vanity Tables of Douglas Sirk (short)
- 2014 : Becoming Anita Ekberg (short)
- 2015 : I, Dalio (short)
- 2015 : Our Stars (short)
- 2015 : Max & James & Danielle... (short)
- 2015 : The Circle Closes (short)
- 2016 : Debra Paget, For Example (short)
- 2016 : Tati vs. Bresson : The Gag (short)
- 2016 : Chris Olsen - The Boy Who Cried (short)
- 2016 : Sergei / Sir Gay (short)
- 2017 : The Double Life of Paul Henreid (short)
- 2017 : The Empty Screen or The Metaphysics of Movies (short)
- 2017 : Private Screenings (short)
- 2018 : Will Geer - America's Grandpa (short)
- 2019 : Conrad Veidt - My Life
- 2019 : Anna/Nana/Nana/Anna (short)
- 2020 : L'Année dernière à Dachau (short)
- 2020 : The Stendhal Syndrome or My Dinner with Turhan Bey (short)
- 2021 : Two for the Opera Box (short)
- 2021 : Love in the Time of Corona (short)
- 2021 : Martin und Hans (short)
- 2022 : Rope's End (short)
- 2023 : The Marriage of Greta Garbo and Sergei Eisenstein (short)
