= Dundee and the Culhane =

- Created by: Sam Rolfe
- Starring: John Mills; Sean Garrison
- Composers: Van Alexander; David Rose; Gerald Fried; Mundell Lowe
- Country of origin: United States
- Original language: English
- No. of seasons: 1
- No. of episodes: 13

Production
- Running time: 60 minutes
- Production company: Filmways TV Productions

Original release
- Network: CBS
- Release: September 7 – December 13, 1967

Dundee and the Culhane is an American Western drama series starring John Mills and Sean Garrison that aired on CBS from September 6 to December 13, 1967.

== Synopsis ==
Dundee and the Culhane follows the exploits of two frontier lawyers who provided legal defense to their accused clients. Dundee, played by Mills, was an older English lawyer who travelled to the American Old West and partners with a young Irish-American lawyer, nicknamed the Culhane. The title of each episode ended with the word "brief", as in a legal brief.

The show attempted to combine the Western and legal show genres, but with little success. CBS had bought it on the strength of its pilot, but after seeing a few additional episodes and scripts, network officials were convinced that the show was going to fail before it even got started. CBS decided in September to replace Dundee and the Culhane in December with a Jonathan Winters variety hour.

== Cast ==
- John Mills as Dundee
- Sean Garrison as The Culhane

== Episodes ==
No.	Title	Directed by	Written by	Original release date
1	"The Turn the Other Cheek Brief"	Boris Sagal	Ernest Frankel	September 6, 1967
2	"The Vasquez Brief"	Richard Benedict	Fred DeGorter	September 13, 1967
3	"The Cat in Bag Brief"	Joseph Sargent	Sam Rolfe	September 20, 1967
4	"The Murderer Stallion Brief"	Alf Kjellin	Story by : Daniel B. Ullman; Teleplay by : George Kirgo	September 27, 1967
5	"The Dead Man's Brief"	Boris Sagal	Dean Hargrove	October 4, 1967
6	"The Jubilee Raid Brief"	Sam Wanamaker	Theodore Apstein	October 18, 1967
7	"The 1,000 Feet Deep Brief"	Charles Rondeau	Ken Trevey	October 25, 1967
8	"Duelist Brief"	Leo Penn	Andy Lewis	November 1, 1967
9	"The 3:10 to a Lynching Brief"	Leo Penn	Robert L. Goodwin	November 8, 1967
10	"The Death of a Warrior Brief"	Jeff Hayden	Jack Miller	November 15, 1967
11	"The Thy Brother's Keeper Brief"	Ida Lupino	Ron Honthaner	November 22, 1967
12	"The Widow's Weeds Brief"	Gunnar Hellström	George Atkins	November 29, 1967
13	"The Catch a Thief Brief"	Robert Gist	Don Balluck	December 13, 1967

== Guest stars ==
- John Anderson
- Tige Andrews
- John Drew Barrymore
- Charles Bronson
- Michael Burns
- William Campbell
- David Canary
- Lonny Chapman
- Dabney Coleman
- Jack Collins
- Michael Constantine
- Cyril Delevanti
- William Fawcett
- Douglas Fowley
- Michael Hinn
- Clyde Howdy
- Don Keefer
- Ken Mayer
- John McIntire
- Ralph Meeker
- Sam Melville
- Stuart Nisbet
- Simon Oakland
- Warren Oates
- Carroll O'Connor
- John M. Pickard
- William Phipps
- Ingrid Pitt
- Ford Rainey
- Stuart Randall
- Donnelly Rhodes
- Bing Russell
- Frank Silvera
- Julie Sommars
- Dub Taylor
- Irene Tedrow
- Mitch Vogel
- William Windom
- Dana Wynter
