= Sean Garrison =

American film, television and theatre actor (1937–2018)

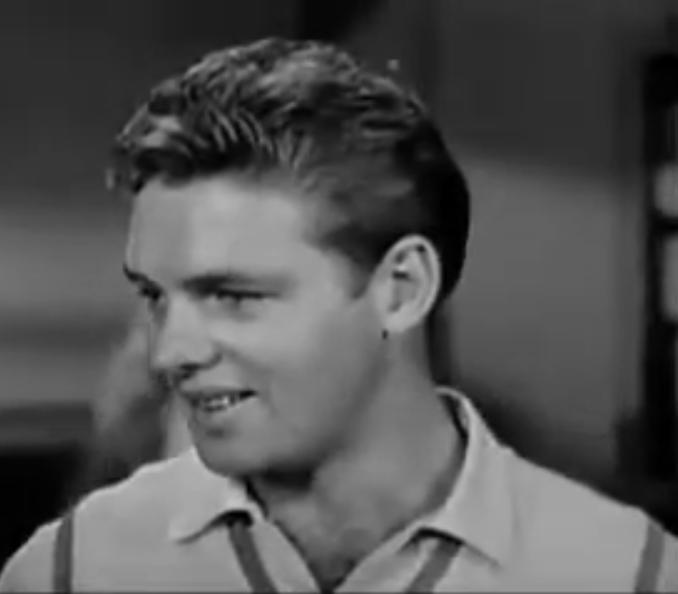
- Garrison in The Adventures of Ozzie and Harriet, 1958
- Born: October 19, 1937; New York, U.S.
- Died: March 2, 2018 (aged 80); Morongo Valley, California, U.S.
- Occupations: Film, television and theatre actor
- Years active: 1958–1981
- Children: 1

Sean Garrison (October 19, 1937 – March 2, 2018) was an American film, television and theatre actor. He was best known for playing Mark Dominic in the 1966 film Moment to Moment.

== Early life ==
Garrison was born in New York, of Irish descent. When Garrison was five his father died. By the age of nine, he was working as a shoeshiner. When a customer asked him to sing a song while giving him a shoeshine, he sang the cowboy song "Home on the Range" and was given a $1.20 tip. Reasoning that this might give him a competitive edge in a crowded market, he became a singing shoeshiner. He expanded his repertoire to include songs appropriate to occasions such as Memorial Day and Mother's Day, when he also sang in bars. He later worked on a dairy farm in Upstate New York, leaving school at the age of fifteen. He then moved south to Florida and the Caribbean, where he did a variety of jobs before relocating to California in 1955 and finding work in a furniture and tile factory.

== Acting career ==
After a friend suggested that he look for work in television, Garrison took a job as a film librarian at the television broadcasting network ABC. He was then signed to a short-term contract with Warner Brothers, resulting in appearances in the 1958 films Darby's Rangers, Violent Road and Onionhead, and in episodes of the ABC western television series Colt .45, Cheyenne, and Sugarfoot. Deciding that he needed better acting skills, he returned to New York the same year to study at the Actors Studio. He supported himself with a series of part-time jobs, including working as a Santa Claus at Gimbels and Macy's department stores.

In 1959, Garrison appeared in the film Up Periscope, and in 1960, he made his Broadway debut in the play There Was a Little Girl, which however ran on Broadway for only one week. in 1961, he appeared in the films Splendor in the Grass and Bridge to the Sun. From 1962 to 1963, he again appeared on the Broadway stage in The Beauty Part. In 1962, he awarded the Theatre World Award, for his performance on the Off-Broadway play Half-Past Wednesday. From October 1963 to December 1964, he was a member of the touring cast of Camelot, playing the role of "Lancelot" in over 300 performances. Warner Brothers were casting for a film production at the time, and were considering him for the same role, but his performance didn't impress them sufficiently and he wasn't cast, almost stalling his film career. In 1965, he appeared in Boston in the musical Hot September.

In 1966, Garrison returned to his screen career, playing Mark Dominic, starring opposite Jean Seberg in Moment to Moment, and in 1967, he starred as The Culhane, starring along with John Mills in the CBS western television program Dundee and the Culhane. He guest starred in television programs including Gunsmoke, The Rockford Files, Cheyenne, The Big Valley, Police Woman, The Adventures of Ozzie and Harriet, Buck Rogers in the 25th Century and Love, American Style. Later film appearances included Banning and Midway. He retired from acting in the early 1980s to work in the swimming pool construction industry.

== Personal life and death ==
Garrison married while living in New York in the late 1950s, but later divorced. He had one child.

Garrison died in Morongo Valley, California on March 2, 2018, at the age of 80.
