= Elliott Baker =

American screenwriter (1922–2007)

Elliott Baker (December 15, 1922 – February 9, 2007), born Elliot Joseph Cohen, was a screenwriter and novelist. He died from cancer in 2007 at the age of 84.

Baker was born in Buffalo, New York, and graduated from Indiana University. He was the author of the comic novel A Fine Madness, which was published in 1964 by G.P. Putnam's Sons. He adapted the novel into a 1966 motion picture starring Sean Connery and Joanne Woodward.

A Fine Madness tells the story of Samson Shillitoe, a rebellious poet in Greenwich Village who battles a psychiatrist seeking to curb his mood swings via psychosurgery. The New York Times Book Review called the novel "a masterpiece of what one might call rebellious farce."

His other novels included Pocock & Pitt (Putnam, 1971), which was the basis for the television series Adderly, which Baker also created; Klynt's Law (Harcourt, Brace, Jovanovich, 1976); And We Were Young (Times Books, 1979); and Unhealthful Air (Viking, 1988). His novel The Penny Wars (Putnam, 1968) was adapted for the Broadway stage.

As a screenwriter he wrote a number of television movies, and was nominated for an Emmy award in 1976 for his adaptation of The Entertainer. He also wrote "Side Show", the most famous episode of Roald Dahl's 1961 television anthology horror series Way Out, which featured a carnival "electric woman with a light bulb for a head." He also wrote the mini-series adaptation of Lace from a novel by Shirley Conran and Lace II. He wrote the script for the ABC mini-series, Malibu starring William Atherton and Susan Dey.
