= John Mark Dean =

American marine biologist (1936–2025)

- Dean in 1954
- Born: October 2, 1936; Cedar Rapids, Iowa, U.S.
- Died: March 27, 2025 (aged 88); West Columbia, South Carolina, U.S.
- Education: Cornell College; Purdue University
- Occupations: Conservationist, marine biologist

John Mark Dean (October 2, 1936 – March 27, 2025) was an American conservationist and marine biologist.

== Life and career ==
Dean was born in Cedar Rapids, Iowa, the son of Kenneth and Verla Dean. He attended and graduated from Marshalltown High School. After graduating, he attended Cornell College, earning his BA degree in 1958. He also attended Purdue University, earning his MS degree in 1960 and his PhD degree in 1962, which after earning his degrees, he worked as a postdoctoral fellow at the Duke University Marine Laboratory.

Dean served as a professor in the department of earth ocean and environment at the University of South Carolina from 1977 to 2002. During his years as a professor, in 2001, he was named a distinguished professor.

== Death ==
Dean died on March 27, 2025, at his home in West Columbia, South Carolina, at the age of 88.
