= Ray Carney =

American scholar and critic

Raymond Carney (born February 28, 1947) is an American scholar and critic, primarily known for his work as a film theorist, although he writes extensively on American art and literature as well. He is known for his study of the works of actor and director John Cassavetes. He teaches in the Film and Television department of the Boston University College of Communication at Boston University and has published several books on American art and film.

== Background ==
Carney was educated at Harvard (magna cum laude) and Rutgers University. Professor Carney taught literature at Middlebury College and Humanities at the University of Texas at Dallas. He was also a William Rice Kimball Fellow at Stanford University, working on a study of performance art, particularly the stand-up comedy of Richard Pryor and Lenny Bruce.

== Viewpoints ==
Carney is highly critical of Hollywood filmmaking, and the way it is approached from an academic standpoint. He is well known for the controversial stridency with which he attacks directors such as Steven Spielberg, Brian De Palma, the Coen brothers, Alfred Hitchcock, Stanley Kubrick, Orson Welles, David Lynch and Quentin Tarantino, whom he describes as tricksters using empty style and pseudo-intellectualism to score points with an “in” crowd. Carney often refers to Spielberg’s output after Schindler’s List (1993) as “Steven ‘Please take me seriously’ Spielberg movies.” Carney is as critical of the academic establishment that gives plaudits to these directors as he is of the filmmakers themselves.

In his 1989 The Alaska Quarterly Review essay on Woody Allen, “Modernism for the Millions,” Carney notes that Allen uses humour in his films to defuse situations that he, the filmmaker, is uncomfortable with, such as drug use and depression. At the same time, Allen wants to get credit for bringing up these issues, as that is what serious artists do.

Carney argues that an emphasis on interpreting symbolism shows a “high school” understanding of art, and that this kind of “decoder ring” approach is in place because it is easier to grasp and makes scholars feel more important and esoteric. Carney believes that the meaning of a creative work lies at its surface, and imagines a world where art is appreciated for what it objectively contains rather than what is read into it, an aesthetic he refers to as pragmatic. He argues that audiences can, for example, simply appreciate the acting in a film and gain meaning from this, what the characters actually say and do, and the tonal shifts that accompany these actions.

== Controversy ==
He feuded with Gena Rowlands over his discovery of the first cut of the 1958 film Shadows claiming to be his own and not of Faces International.

In May 2012, Mark Rappaport filed a lawsuit against Carney for refusing to give back more than two dozen film reels, 16 videotapes, 14 scripts, and papers including rough drafts of Rappaport’s movies which the filmmaker had previously entrusted to Carney to transport to Paris. Carney, however, has maintained that Rappaport actually gave him the items as gifts and is now engaging in cyberbullying against him. No written agreement was signed when the material was shipped to Carney. The suit was dropped in September of that same year, due to rising legal costs, although Rappaport later started an online petition demanding that Carney return the items.

== Works ==
Carney met Cassavetes during the last years of the director’s life, and was the first American scholar to write books on the director. In 2003, Carney’s research led to the discovery of the first version of Cassavetes’s seminal work Shadows. Besides his work on John Cassavetes, Carney has written on Carl Theodor Dreyer, Frank Capra, and Mike Leigh. He has also written extensively on American literature (particularly the works of Henry James) and art (particularly painters such as Sargent and Hopper).

=== Selected works ===
- Carney, Raymond Francis, Junior, American Dreaming: The Films of John Cassavetes and the American Experience, (Berkeley and Los Angeles, California and London: University of California Press, 1985).
- Carney, Raymond Francis, Junior, American Vision: The Films of Frank Capra, (Cambridge, London, New York and New Rochelle, New York, Oakleigh and Melbourne, Victoria, and Sydney, New South Wales: Cambridge University Press, 1986).
- Carney, Raymond Francis, Junior, Speaking the Language of Desire: The Films of Carl Dreyer, Cambridge University Press, 1989
- Carney, Raymond Francis, Junior, The Films of John Cassavetes: Pragmatism, Modernism, and the Movies, Cambridge University Press, 1994.
- Carney, Raymond Francis, Junior and Quart, Leonard, The Films of Mike Leigh: Embracing the World, Cambridge University Press, 2000.
- Carney, Raymond Francis, Junior, (Editor), Cassavetes on Cassavetes, Faber and Faber and Farrar, Straus, and Giroux, 2001).
- Carney, Raymond Francis, Junior, Shadows, British Film Institute Publishing, Palgrave Macmillan, Indiana University Press, and University of California Press, 2001).
