= George C. Armstrong =

American politician (1872–1950)

Member of the Illinois Senate
- In office 1941–1949

Personal details
- Born: July 11, 1872 Eldora, Iowa, U.S.
- Died: December 27, 1950 (aged 78) Lawrenceville, Illinois, U.S.
- Party: Republican
- Education: Marshalltown High School; University of Baltimore
- Occupation: Politician, businessman, newspaper editor

George C. Armstrong (July 11, 1872–December 27, 1950) was an American businessman, newspaper editor, and politician.

Armstrong was born in Eldora, Iowa. He attended Marshalltown High School in Marshalltown, Iowa, business college, and University of Baltimore. Armstrong worked in the oil refinery business. He was also involved in the engraving and real estate businesses. Armstrong lived in Lawrenceville, Illinois and was the editor and publisher of the Lawrenceville Daily Record newspaper. Armstrong served on the Lawrenceville City Council and as mayor of Lawrenceville. He was a Republican. He served in the Illinois Senate from 1941 to 1949. He died in Lawrenceville, Illinois from a short illness.
