= Mousey =

1974 Canadian film by Daniel Petrie

- Directed by: Daniel Petrie
- Written by: John Peacock
- Produced by: Beryl Vertue; Aida Young
- Starring: Kirk Douglas; Jean Seberg
- Cinematography: Jack Hildyard
- Edited by: John Trumper
- Music by: Ron Grainer
- Production companies: Associated London Films; Universal Television
- Distributed by: American Broadcasting Company; Anglo-EMI Film Distributors; Alliance Films; MCA/Universal Pictures; MTC Video; New Gold Entertainment; VTI Home Vídeo; Warner Home Video
- Release date: 9 March 1974 (U.S.)
- Running time: 89 minutes
- Country: Canada
- Language: English

Mousey (released as Cat and Mouse in cinemas and on UK television) is a 1974 Canadian thriller film directed by Daniel Petrie, and starring Kirk Douglas, Jean Seberg, and John Vernon.

Although produced for television, the film was released theatrically outside Canada and the United States. In London, it was shown as part of a double feature with Craze.

== Plot ==
In Halifax, Nova Scotia, biology teacher George Anderson is nicknamed "Mousey" by his students after he fails to dissect a frog. When he learns that his pregnant wife is carrying another man's child, he follows her to Montreal, where he intends to kill both her and her lover.

== Cast ==
- Kirk Douglas as George Anderson
- Jean Seberg as Laura Anderson / Richardson
- John Vernon as David Richardson
- Bessie Love as Mrs. Richardson
- Beth Porter as Sandra
- Sam Wanamaker as inspector
- James Bradford as private detective
- Suzanne Lloyd as Nancy
- Stuart Chandler as Simon
- Valerie Colgan as Miss Wainwright
- Mavis Villiers as Martha
- Elliott Sullivan as Harry
- Bob Sherman as barman
- James Berwick as headmaster
- Margo Alexis as Miss Carter
- Robert Henderson as attorney
- Louis Negin as couturier
- Jennifer Watts as party guest
- Tony Sibbald as workman
- Don Fellows as foreman
- Francis Napier as engineer
- Roy Stephens as hotel receptionist
- Elsa Pickthorne as concierge
- John Corbett as pawnshop customer

== Production ==
Mousey was filmed on location in Montreal, Canada and at Pinewood Studios in England. Filming commenced in November 1973.

== Reception ==
The film received mixed reviews. Steven H. Scheuer called it "complicated and not very interesting", and the Los Angeles Times wrote that it "seems to have been doomed from the start".

Leonard Maltin reviewed the film more favourably, calling it "tightly made" and praising Douglas as "wonderfully sinister". Amis du film described it as a "good 'suspense' film", though noted a lack of originality in its plot. The Monthly Film Bulletin called it "a thriller with some pretensions to psychological depth".

== Legacy ==
Mousey has been re-aired on television and released on VHS, with several film blogs noting a developing cult following.
