= John Hurlburt =

American football player (1898–1968)

No. 5
- Position: Halfback

Personal information
- Born: July 23, 1898; Burlington, Iowa, U.S.
- Died: March 3, 1968 (aged 69); Napa County, California, U.S.
- Listed height: 6 ft 0 in (1.83 m)
- Listed weight: 175 lb (79 kg)

Career information
- High school: Marshalltown (Marshalltown, Iowa)
- College: Chicago

Career history
- Chicago Cardinals (1924–1925)

Awards and highlights
- NFL champion (1925); Second-team All-Pro (1924)
- Stats at Pro Football Reference

John Blair Hurlburt (July 23, 1898 – March 3, 1968) was an American professional football halfback who played two seasons with the Chicago Cardinals of the National Football League (NFL). Hurlburt played college football at the University of Chicago. He was a member of the Cardinals team that were NFL champions in 1925.

== Early life and college ==
John Blair Hurlburt was born on July 23, 1898, in Burlington, Iowa. He attended Marshalltown High School in Marshalltown, Iowa.

Hurlburt played college football for the Chicago Maroons of the University of Chicago and was a letterman in 1921.

== Professional career ==
Hurlburt played in nine games, starting seven, for the Chicago Cardinals of the National Football League (NFL) in 1924, scoring two rushing touchdowns and one receiving touchdown. For his performance during the 1924 season, Hurlburt was named a second-team All-Pro by the Chicago-based Collyer's Eye. He appeared in five games, starting one, during the 1925 season. He wore jersey number 5 during his tenure with the Cardinals.

== Personal life ==
Hurlburt died on March 3, 1968, in Napa County, California.
