= Albion, Iowa =

- City
- Location of Albion, Iowa
- Coordinates: 42°06′45″N 92°59′19″W
- Country: United States
- State: Iowa
- County: Marshall

Area
  - Total: 0.60 sq mi (1.56 km^{2})
  - Land: 0.60 sq mi (1.56 km^{2})
  - Water: 0 sq mi (0.00 km^{2})
- Elevation: 958 ft (292 m)

Population (2020)
  - Total: 448
  - Density: 742.9/sq mi (286.85/km^{2})
- Time zone: UTC-6 (Central (CST))
  - Summer (DST): UTC-5 (CDT)
- ZIP code: 50005
- Area code: 641
- FIPS code: 19-00955
- GNIS feature ID: 2393907
- Website: albioniowa.com

Albion is a city in Marshall County, Iowa, United States. The population was 448 at the 2020 census.

== History ==
Albion was founded in 1852. The town was first called La Fayette until the name was changed to Albion in 1858. The present name is after Albion, the poetic name for Britain.

== Geography ==
According to the United States Census Bureau, the city has a total area of 0.60 square miles (1.55 km^{2}), all land.

== Demographics ==
Historical populations
Year	Pop.	±%
1870	475	—
1880	495	+4.2%
1890	384	−22.4%
1900	440	+14.6%
1910	457	+3.9%
1920	392	−14.2%
1930	436	+11.2%
1940	476	+9.2%
1950	492	+3.4%
1960	588	+19.5%
1970	772	+31.3%
1980	739	−4.3%
1990	585	−20.8%
2000	592	+1.2%
2010	505	−14.7%
2020	448	−11.3%
Source:"U.S. Census website". United States Census Bureau. and Iowa Data Center; Source: U.S. Decennial Census

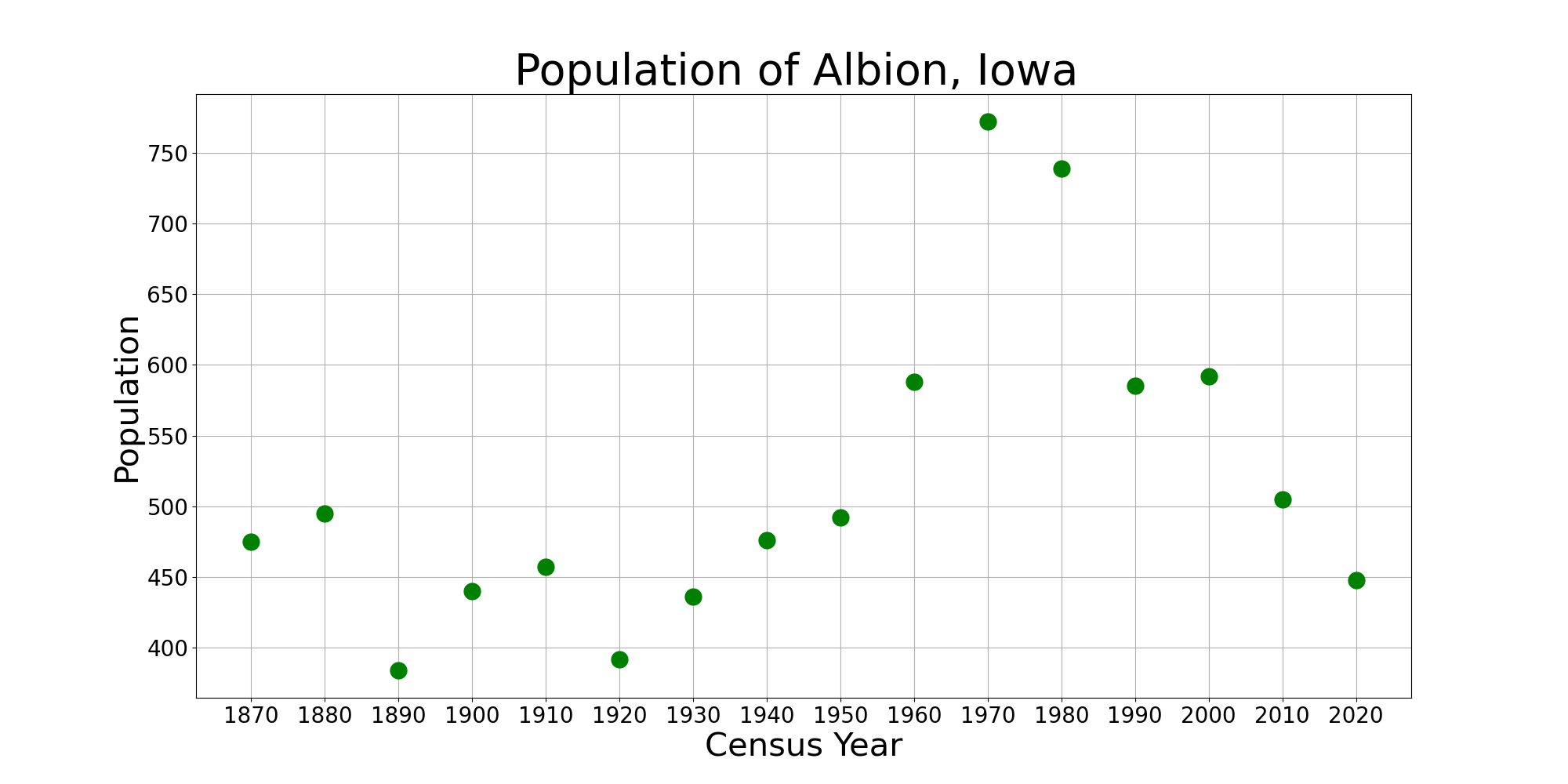
The population of Albion, Iowa from US census data

=== 2020 census ===
As of the census of 2020, there were 448 people, 202 households, and 131 families residing in the city. The population density was 742.9 inhabitants per square mile (286.9/km^{2}). There were 211 housing units at an average density of 349.9 per square mile (135.1/km^{2}). The racial makeup of the city was 92.4% White, 0.7% Black or African American, 0.7% Native American, 0.2% Asian, 0.0% Pacific Islander, 0.9% from other races and 5.1% from two or more races. Hispanic or Latino persons of any race comprised 4.5% of the population.

Of the 202 households, 28.2% of which had children under the age of 18 living with them, 49.0% were married couples living together, 10.4% were cohabitating couples, 15.8% had a female householder with no spouse or partner present and 24.8% had a male householder with no spouse or partner present. 35.1% of all households were non-families. 28.2% of all households were made up of individuals, 11.9% had someone living alone who was 65 years old or older.

The median age in the city was 47.4 years. 21.0% of the residents were under the age of 20; 6.2% were between the ages of 20 and 24; 19.6% were from 25 and 44; 28.1% were from 45 and 64; and 25.0% were 65 years of age or older. The gender makeup of the city was 52.7% male and 47.3% female.

=== 2010 census ===
As of the census of 2010, there were 505 people, 206 households, and 147 families living in the city. The population density was 841.7 inhabitants per square mile (325.0/km^{2}). There were 220 housing units at an average density of 366.7 per square mile (141.6/km^{2}). The racial makeup of the city was 97.8% White, 0.2% African American, 0.4% Pacific Islander, and 1.6% from two or more races. Hispanic or Latino of any race were 1.8% of the population.

There were 206 households, of which 31.1% had children under the age of 18 living with them, 55.8% were married couples living together, 6.3% had a female householder with no husband present, 9.2% had a male householder with no wife present, and 28.6% were non-families. 23.8% of all households were made up of individuals, and 8.8% had someone living alone who was 65 years of age or older. The average household size was 2.45 and the average family size was 2.83.

The median age in the city was 42.8 years. 23.8% of residents were under the age of 18; 7% were between the ages of 18 and 24; 23% were from 25 to 44; 28.8% were from 45 to 64; and 17.2% were 65 years of age or older. The gender makeup of the city was 52.1% male and 47.9% female.

=== 2000 census ===
As of the census of 2000, there were 592 people, 222 households, and 172 families living in the city. The population density was 999.7 inhabitants per square mile (386.0/km^{2}). There were 234 housing units at an average density of 395.2 per square mile (152.6/km^{2}). The racial makeup of the city was 98.99% White, 0.68% Asian, and 0.34% from two or more races. Hispanic or Latino of any race were 1.01% of the population.

There were 222 households, out of which 32.9% had children under the age of 18 living with them, 63.1% were married couples living together, 9.0% had a female householder with no husband present, and 22.1% were non-families. 17.1% of all households were made up of individuals, and 4.5% had someone living alone who was 65 years of age or older. The average household size was 2.67 and the average family size was 2.95.

In the city, the population was spread out, with 28.5% under the age of 18, 6.8% from 18 to 24, 27.2% from 25 to 44, 25.7% from 45 to 64, and 11.8% who were 65 years of age or older. The median age was 36 years. For every 100 females, there were 108.5 males. For every 100 females age 18 and over, there were 103.4 males.

The median income for a household in the city was $36,875, and the median income for a family was $41,250. Males had a median income of $31,042 versus $24,375 for females. The per capita income for the city was $14,770. About 9.4% of families and 15.9% of the population were below the poverty line, including 20.1% of those under age 18 and 10.0% of those age 65 or over.

== Economy ==
The median home price was an estimated $75,300 in 2011. The median gross rent in Albion was $600/mo.

== Education ==
It is served by the Marshalltown Community School District, which operates Marshalltown High School.
