= Marshalltown Community School District =

Public school district in Marshalltwon, Iowa, United States

Coordinates: 42.036340°N 92.907350°W

Location
- Marshalltown, Iowa Marshall County United States
- Coordinates: 42.036340, -92.907350

District information
- Type: Local school district
- Grades: K-12
- Established: 1853
- Superintendent: Dr. Theron Schuette
- Schools: 9
- Budget: $83,500,000 (2020-21)
- NCES District ID: 1918720

Students and staff
- Students: 5,190 (2022-23)
- Teachers: 364.14 FTE
- Staff: 350.96 FTE
- Student–teacher ratio: 14.25
- Athletic conference: Central Iowa Metro League
- District mascot: Bobcats
- Colors: Blue and Red

Other information
- Website: www.marshalltown.k12.ia.us

Marshalltown Community School District (MCSD) is a public school district headquartered in Marshalltown, Iowa.

Entirely located in Marshall County, the district serves almost all of Marshalltown, Albion, and Haverhill.

As of 2020, the superintendent is Dr. Theron Schuette.

== History ==
=== Early history ===
The first schoolhouse in Marshalltown was a log cabin built in 1853. The building stood on Main Street between Third and Fourth Streets. Neary Hoxie served as the first teacher.

In 1874 high school classes were held in an old building on North Center Street. The high school had 45 students and C.P. Rogers served as the school's superintendent.

Prior to 1900 Anson School on South Center Street functioned as a primary school. The building was divided into two sections, one for grades 1 through 4 and another for grades 5 through 8. The curriculum included reading, arithmetic, spelling, geography, history, and writing. The upper grades also received teaching in agriculture and hygiene.

In 1883 a schoolhouse was built which was destroyed by fire in 1892. Until a new school could be built, classroom space was rented on Main Street. On September 6, 1894, a new school was built at a cost of $70,000. The structure had two floors of classrooms, a basement, and an auditorium on the third floor. The building was constructed of St. Louis pressed brick, Portage red sandstone, with oak, cypress, and yellow pine woodwork. The senior high later moved to a new building in 1927.

=== Modern history ===
Franklin Elementary School was originally built in 1913, but was later destroyed and replaced with another one in its place with the same name. The new building was constructed in the early 1990s and opened at the start of the 1995–1996 school year. The school currently enrolls 400 students and employs 60 staff members.

Lenihan Intermediate School was initially built in 1965 as a Catholic high school at a cost of $775,000. It was designed to house 300 students. After five years in operation, the administrators of Lenihan High School found it was financially impossible to continue providing quality education for their students. At the same time, the public school in Marshalltown was overcrowded with students at the junior high school level. The solution decided upon by both parties was to sell Lenihan to the public school system and to make the school a 7, 8, 9 junior high. The transaction was completed and Lenihan Junior High became a reality in the fall of 1970. The Catholic school name, mascot, and school colors were all retained in the new public junior high school.

The need for additional space at Lenihan Junior High resulted in the construction of six rooms on the east side of the building in 1975. The addition consisted of three regular classrooms, an art room, and two industrial arts facilities.

In the late 1970s, Lenihan Junior High's enrollment was in the 470s but then declined to a total of approximately 400 students. In 1984, the 6th grade was added to the school, which briefly put the enrollment over 500. However, with declining enrollment, the school housed between 400-450 students in grades 6–9 in the latter part of the 1980s. In the spring of 1988, the school board voted to close Lenihan at the end of the 1989 school year. An increase in population coupled with troubles equally distributing resources between two middle schools—Miller Middle School and Anson Middle School—led to a reorganization and unification of grades 5 and above within the city. Anson Middle School was closed as a school and now houses the district's Building and Grounds Department. Lenihan Junior High after its closure had served in various administrative functions, but the Marshalltown Community School District renovated it and the building became Lenihan Intermediate School which opened for the 2006–2007 school year.

== Schools ==
Secondary schools

- Marshalltown High School
- Miller Middle School

Primary schools

- Lenihan Intermediate School
- Elementary schools:
  - Anson Elementary School
  - Fisher Elementary School
  - Franklin Elementary School
  - Hoglan Elementary School
  - Rogers Elementary School
  - Woodbury Elementary School

Preschool

- Preschool program

Alternative

- Marshalltown Learning Academy

== See also ==
- List of school districts in Iowa
