= Beulah Wheeler =

American attorney (1896–1971)

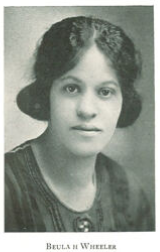
- Yearbook Photo of Beulah Wheeler
- Born: February 13, 1896; Minneapolis, Minnesota, U.S.
- Died: May 15, 1971 (aged 75)
- Education: Marshalltown High School; Iowa State University; University of Iowa College of Law

Beulah Wheeler (February 13, 1896 – May 15, 1971) was an American attorney who, in 1924, became the first African-American woman to graduate from the University of Iowa College of Law.

== Early life ==
Born in Minneapolis, Minnesota, on February 13, 1896, Wheeler—birth name either unknown or simply not recorded—was brought to Marshalltown, Iowa at the age of one by her adoptive parents, John Calvin and Mary Jennie Wheeler. She graduated from Marshalltown High School in 1915, then attended Iowa State University and the University of Iowa College of Law.

== University of Iowa's College of Law ==
In May 1921, her story "Soapsud Dreams"—described by the author as a study in realism—won second place in a university-held short story contest. Her speech "Uniform Marriage and Divorce Law" won first place in the Women's Extemporaneous Speech Contest hosted by the women's Forensic League with a prize money award of $10. Her photo was featured in the 1922 Hawkeye for winning first place. She also won athletic awards for playing basketball and volleyball. Though she graduated in 1924, she reportedly did not receive her law degree until forty-one years later.

The Iowa Bystander, a four-page weekly to serve as the voice of Iowa's African American community, featured Wheeler in an article in 1920. When she was a student at Iowa State College, she was noted to have "quadrupled" the subscriptions to the periodical for Topeka, Kansas.

The Daily Iowan reported that she was one of two women taking the bar examinations, reported on June 11, 1924.

After school, she moved to Leavenworth, Kansas, for three years and then to Chicago, where she practiced law.

== Later life ==
In March 1956, Wheeler, then 60 years old and residing in Chicago's 21st Congressional district, made what would prove an unsuccessful bid to unseat one of that District's incumbent Democratic Representatives, campaigning on the promise to "take the profit out of narcotics".

Following that failed bid, Wheeler remained out of the public eye and, it appears, utterly forgotten. And thus it is, purely by virtue of the claim made for Social Security benefits in April 1966 (at which time Wheeler definitely still resided in Chicago), that we know of her death, aged 75, on May 15, 1971.
