= Time Out for Love =

1961 French film

- Directed by: Jean Valère
- Starring: Jean Seberg; Maurice Ronet; Micheline Presle; Annibale Ninchi; Françoise Prévost
- Release date: 1961
- Country: France
- Language: French

Time Out for Love is a 1961 French film directed by Jean Valère starring Jean Seberg.

It was also known as Les grandes personnes.

== Cast ==
- Jean Seberg as Ann
- Maurice Ronet as Philippe
- Micheline Presle as Michele
- Annibale Ninchi as Dr. Severin
- Françoise Prévost as Gladys
