= Love Play =

1961 French film

Love Play is a 1961 French film starring Jean Seberg. It was directed by Seberg's then husband Francois Moreuil.

It was also known as La récréation or Playtime.

It was based on a short story by Francois Sagan.

== Cast ==
- Jean Seberg as Kate Hoover
- Christian Marquand as Philippe
- Françoise Prévost as Anne de Limeuil
- Evelyne Ker
