= Moment to Moment =

1966 film by Mervyn LeRoy

- Directed by: Mervyn LeRoy
- Screenplay by: John Lee Mahin; Alec Coppel
- Based on: "Laughs with a Stranger" by Alec Coppel story by
- Produced by: Mervyn LeRoy
- Starring: Jean Seberg; Honor Blackman; Sean Garrison
- Cinematography: Harry Stradling
- Edited by: Philip W. Anderson
- Music by: Henry Mancini
- Color process: Technicolor
- Production company: Mervyn LeRoy Productions
- Distributed by: Universal Pictures
- Release dates: January 27, 1966 (Miami, Florida)
- Running time: 108 minutes
- Country: United States
- Language: English
- Box office: $1 million (est. US/ Canada rentals)

Moment to Moment is a 1966 American neo-noir psychological thriller film directed by Mervyn LeRoy and starring Jean Seberg, Honor Blackman and Sean Garrison.

== Plot ==
Kay Stanton lives on the French Riviera with her psychiatrist husband Neil Stanton and son Tommy. One day while Neil is away, Kay meets American naval ensign Mark, and they begin an affair. Kay realizes that she does love her husband and tries to discontinue the relationship. While arguing with Mark, Kay accidentally shoots him. With the help of her friend Daphne, she dumps Mark's body into a ravine and then calls the police anonymously to report its location.

Later, the police ask Neil to help an amnesiac gunshot victim. The man is revealed to be Mark, who regains his memory but does not betray Kay. Neil realizes the truth as well but is certain that his wife really loves him.

== Cast ==
- Jean Seberg as Kay Stanton
- Honor Blackman as Daphne Fields
- Sean Garrison as Mark Dominic
- Arthur Hill as Neil Stanton
- Grégoire Aslan as Insp. DeFargo
- Peter Robbins as Timmy Stanton
- Donald Woods as Mr. Singer
- Walter Reed as Hendricks
- Albert Carrier as Travel Agent
- Lomax Study as Albie
- Richard Angarola as Givet
- Georgette Anys as Louise

== Production ==
The film was based on a story by Alec Coppel that had been purchased by Mervyn LeRoy, who described the film as a "woman's picture."

LeRoy faced difficulty casting the lead roles because "... it's so hard to find actresses who really look like ladies." Jean Seberg was selected for the part of Kay, but she had not acted in a Hollywood film for several years. Other candidates for the role included Grace Kelly, Audrey Hepburn and Julie Andrews.

Honor Blackman was cast on the basis of her success in Goldfinger. "If I'm ever to make an international name, now is the time to cash in on it," said Blackman. Arthur Hill was cast after his recent Broadway success in Who's Afraid of Virginia Woolf?. Sean Garrison had just toured around the country in a production of Camelot and signed long-term contracts with LeRoy and Universal. LeRoy found difficulty casting the male roles, saying, "There are few young men who really look manly."

Shooting occurred partly on location in the South of France in Nice, Mougins, Cannes and Saint-Paul-de-Vence, but most filming occurred at Universal Pictures on a $350,000 set designed to resemble the French Riviera. Costumes were provided by Yves Saint Laurent.

The film's title song was written by Henry Mancini and Johnny Mercer.

== Reception ==
In a contemporary review for The New York Times, critic Howard Thompson wrote: "[A] good, tingling plot manages to flesh out some persuasive characterizations and convincing human behavior—up to a point." Thompson criticized the film's plot and direction: "Having transported, with the aid of her neighbor, Miss Blackman, the body of Mr. Garrison into the woods, why would the otherwise sensible heroine drive back to the site, poke and pry around and lead the police straight back to the villa? It's hard to forgive her fatal curiosity or stupidity. ... If only Mr. LeRoy had run a tight wire through his handsome production. Instead, his direction is rather slack and circular, like a standard fishing reel. The bait is all there, but don't expect to be hooked."

== See also ==
- List of American films of 1966
