= Gang War in Naples =

- Film poster
- Directed by: Pasquale Squitieri
- Screenplay by: Pasquale Squitieri
- Story by: Pasquale Squitieri
- Produced by: Sergio Bonotti
- Starring: Fabio Testi; Jean Seberg; Raymond Pellegrin; Charles Vanel
- Cinematography: Giulio Albonico
- Edited by: Daniele Alabiso
- Music by: Manuel De Sica
- Production companies: Mondial Te. Fi.; Europa Film; Parafrance
- Distributed by: Titanus
- Release dates: 24 August 1972 (Italy); 30 August 1972 (France)
- Running time: 113 minutes
- Countries: Italy; France
- Box office: ₤1,345 billion

Gang War in Naples (Italian: Camorra) is a 1972 crime film written and directed by Pasquale Squitieri.

== Cast ==
- Fabio Testi: Tonino Russo
- Raymond Pellegrin: Don Mario Capece
- Jean Seberg: Luisa
- Enzo Cannavale: Nicola Cafiero "Sciancato"
- Ugo D'Alessio: Pietro Russo, padre di Tonino
- Lilla Brignone: madre di Tonino
- Germana Carnacina: Anna
- Charles Vanel: Don Domenico De Ritis
- Enzo Turco: Don Silverio
- Salvatore Puntillo: il commissario Capezzuto
- Renato Chiantoni: Agostino
- Paul Muller: l'onorevole

== Production ==
Gang War in Naples was director Pasquale Squitieri's fourth film after directing three spaghetti Westerns. Fabio Testi was cast in the film as Tonino Russo after Squitieri saw him in Le Tueur with Jean Gabin. Squitieri went to Paris to meet him despite his producers wanting to cast Massimo Ranieri and Martin Balsam for the roles. Squitieri explained that he "didn't have anything against those actors, but I needed someone who would scare the audience when he came on the screen, and Fabio Testi, with his imposing physique, was just perfect." Squitieri also cast Raymond Pellegrin, noting that Pellegrin "was my idol, he starred in a movie I adore, André Cayatte's Are We All Murderers?." Squiteri also declared casting Jean Seberg was easy as she was Testi's girlfriend at the time.

The film was shot at Incir-De Paolis in Rome and on location in Naples.

== Release ==
Gang War in Naples was distributed theatrically in Italy by Titanus on 24 August 1972. The film grossed a total of 1,345,608,000 Italian lire domestically. Film historian and critic Roberto Curti described the box office success of the film in Italy was to the Camorra what The Godfather was to film on the Sicilian mafia".

It was distributed in France on 30 August 1972 with a 100-minute running time as Les tueurs a gages.
