= Rock Hudson's Home Movies =

- Directed by: Mark Rappaport
- Written by: Mark Rappaport
- Produced by: Coleen Fitzgibbon; Mark Rappaport
- Cinematography: Mark Daniels
- Edited by: Mark Rappaport
- Release date: 1992
- Running time: 63 minutes
- Country: United States
- Language: English

Rock Hudson's Home Movies is a 1992 documentary by Mark Rappaport. It shows clips from Rock Hudson's films that could be interpreted as gay entendres.

== Summary ==
Eric Farr speaks to the camera as if speaking Rock Hudson's words from a posthumous diary. Film clips from more than 30 Hudson films illustrate ways in which his sexual orientation played out on screen. First there are tenuous and unresolved relationships with women, then clips of Rock with men, cruising and circling. Second, there is pedagogical eros: Hudson with older men. Rock is seen with his male sidekicks, often Tony Randall.

== Analysis ==
Next, the film looks in depth at comedies of sexual embarrassment and innuendo: films in which Hudson sometimes plays two characters, "macho Rock and homo Rock." Lastly, the film reflects on Hudson's death from AIDS.

== See also ==
- The Celluloid Closet (film)
- Douglas Sirk
- Essay film
