= A Fine Madness =

1966 film by Irvin Kershner

- Original theatrical poster
- Directed by: Irvin Kershner
- Written by: Elliott Baker
- Based on: A Fine Madness; 1964 novel by Elliott Baker
- Produced by: Jerome Hellman
- Starring: Sean Connery; Joanne Woodward; Jean Seberg; Patrick O'Neal; Colleen Dewhurst; Clive Revill; Werner Peters; John Fiedler; Kay Medford; Jackie Coogan; Zohra Lampert; Sorrell Booke; Sue Ane Langdon
- Cinematography: Ted D. McCord
- Edited by: William H. Ziegler
- Music by: John Addison
- Production company: Pan Arts Company
- Distributed by: Warner Bros. Pictures
- Release dates: May 11, 1966 (Los Angeles); June 29, 1966 (New York City)
- Running time: 104 minutes
- Country: United States
- Language: English
- Budget: $3 million
- Box office: $1.8 million (est. US/ Canada rentals)

A Fine Madness is a 1966 American Technicolor comedy-drama film directed by Irvin Kershner, based on the 1964 novel of the same name by Elliott Baker. It tells the story of Samson Shillitoe, a frustrated poet unable to finish a grand tome. It stars Sean Connery (in the midst of his James Bond roles), Joanne Woodward, Jean Seberg, Patrick O'Neal and Clive Revill.

== Plot ==
Poet Samson Shillitoe lives in Greenwich Village with his wife Rhoda, a waitress who supports him through all his troubles. When Samson cannot find the inspiration to finish his latest poem, he becomes belligerent and depressed. He is continually pursued by a debt collector after his late alimony payments to a previous wife. He assaults a police detective who accompanies the debt collector.

Samson loses his job as an office cleaner for intimate relations with a secretary but earns $200 for a recital of his poetry to a women's group that ends in disaster.

Without Samson's knowledge, Rhoda seeks the help of psychiatrist Dr. West, who claims to be able to cure writer's block, paying him with Samson's $200. She fears that Samson will become suicidal if he cannot finish his poem. West reluctantly agrees to see him, and when Samson confronts the doctor about the return of his money, West is fascinated by Samson and persuades him to become a patient. West arranges a stay for Samson in an upstate sanitarium in order to escape the chaotic city.

Dr. Menken, a doctor at the sanitarium, wishes to experiment on Samson with a new surgical technique he has used primarily on chimpanzees that might quell his violent temper. Menken lies to Rhoda to persuade her to agree to the surgery. West and two other colleagues vehemently oppose the lobotomy as unsuitable for humans.

West's wife Lydia is frustrated with their marriage. West is a popular TV guest for his pop psychiatric methods and views, and she sees very little of him. She meets Samson at the sanitorium. Samson does not know that she is married to West but remembers her from the women's club lecture. Samson seduces her and West discovers them frolicking together naked in a hydrotherapy tub. This causes a vengeful West to reverse himself and cast the deciding vote in favor of the surgery.

Lydia learns of the plan and rushes to stop it, but she arrives just after it has been completed. The operation has no effect, and Samson punches Menken when he comes out of anesthesia. Samson returns to New York resumes his belligerence, and his obsession with finishing his poem. Rhoda rushes to rejoin him. Samson is served with a subpoena, forcing him to pay his ex-wife or go to jail. He once again assaults the process server and his police escort, but Lydia appears and pays the debt.

She tells him she is leaving her husband and wants to be with him. When he invites her to move in with him and his wife, she is offended and stalks out.

Rhoda informs Samson that she is pregnant. At her invitation, he punches her square in the face on a city street, attracting an outraged mob which assails them until their retreat into the doorway of their apartment building.

== Cast ==
- Sean Connery as Samson Shillitoe
- Joanne Woodward as Rhoda
- Jean Seberg as Lydia West
- Patrick O'Neal as Dr. Oliver West
- Colleen Dewhurst as Dr. Vera Kropotkin
- Clive Revill as Dr. Menken
- Werner Peters as Dr. Vorbeck
- John Fiedler as Daniel K. Papp
- Kay Medford as Mrs. Fish
- Jackie Coogan as Mr. Fitzgerald
- Zohra Lampert as Mrs. Tupperman
- Sue Ane Langdon as Miss Walnicki
- Gerald S. O'Loughlin as Chester Quirk- Policeman
- Sorrell Booke as Leonard Tupperman
- Bibi Osterwald as Mrs. Fitzgerald
- Mabel Albertson as Chairwoman
- James Millhollin as Rollie Butter
- Richard S. Castellano as Arnold

== Production ==
Jerome Hellman bought the film rights in May 1964. The project was intended as a coproduction by Metro-Goldwyn-Mayer, Hellman's Pan Arts Company and director Delbert Mann's Biography Productions, with Mann slated to direct the film. The first draft of the script was completed by screenwriter Elliott Baker in August 1964, with production scheduled to begin in the fall, although it would be delayed. Eva Marie Saint, Robert Shaw and Mary Ure were rumored to have joined the cast while the film was in its planning stages.

Sean Connery was interested in the role since Hellman's acquisition of the property but had been busy with other commitments. Hellman and Connery continued to discuss the role for many months, and Hellman traveled to the Bahamas to meet with Connery during the filming of Thunderball. Connery was finally cast in June 1965. By that point, Warner Bros. Pictures had acquired the project, with Irvin Kershner replacing Mann as director. Jackie Coogan was granted a leave of absence from the television series The Addams Family to appear in the film.

Location filming in the Murray Hill section of Manhattan began on September 20, 1965. Hellman invited famed Japanese director Akira Kurosawa to New York to watch the filming, and Kurosawa also scouted area locations for a future film.

== Reception ==
In a contemporary review for The New York Times, critic Howard Thompson called A Fine Madness "a handsomely colored eyeful" and wrote: "There is some fine stuff in 'A Fine Madness.' The Warner picture ... is an odd one indeed, ranging from rich to raucous to plain fumbling. At times, it's funny as all get-out. ... Like its careening, footloose hero, 'A Fine Madness' needs discipline. But you'll never guess what lurks around the bend, from gold to brass."

Critic Philp K. Scheuer of the Los Angeles Times wrote: "It is an ugly picture (though in fine Technicolor) about basically ugly emotions. ... [T]he movie never quite comes to terms with itself. As black comedy or theater of the absurd, it is not far out enough; and since the screen is so real, so larger-than-life, most of its violence comes over not as funny but as shocking, even a little horrifying."

== See also ==
- List of American films of 1966
