= Macho Callahan =

1970 film by Bernard L. Kowalski

- Theatrical release poster
- Directed by: Bernard L. Kowalski (as Bernard Kowalski)
- Screenplay by: Cliff Gould (as Clifford Newton Gould)
- Story by: Richard Carr
- Produced by: Bernard L. Kowalski (as Bernard Kowalski); Martin C. Schute
- Starring: David Janssen; Jean Seberg; Lee J. Cobb; James Booth
- Cinematography: Gerry Fisher
- Edited by: Frank Mazzola; Jerry Taylor; Fabien D. Tordjmann (as Fabien Tordiman)
- Music by: Patrick Williams
- Production company: Felicidad Productions
- Distributed by: Avco Embassy Pictures
- Release date: August 17, 1970
- Running time: 99 minutes
- Countries: Mexico; United States
- Language: English

Macho Callahan is a 1970 Mexican-American Western film directed by Bernard L. Kowalski. It stars David Janssen, Jean Seberg, Lee J. Cobb and James Booth. The screenplay concerns a Union soldier who is imprisoned in a Confederate prison camp during the American Civil War. He manages to escape, but is pursued by a gang of bounty hunters.

== Plot ==
Placed behind bars during the war, Diego Callahan, also known as "Macho," travels to Texas looking for the man responsible for his imprisonment.

He quarrels with a one-armed Confederate Army colonel, David Mountford, over a bottle of champagne and kills him in front of his wife, Alexandra. Vowing vengeance, she immediately puts a $1,000 bounty on Callahan's head. She entices Duffy, who wears the yellow boots that Callahan remembers him by, to help her seek out Callahan.

Traveling with Alexandra through Confederate Texas, Duffy locates Callahan and challenges him to a game of horseshoes for money. When Alexandra seeks Duffy, she finds that Callahan has hanged him.

Alexandra goes to work at a casino run by Harry Wheeler, writing letters for illiterate cowboys. Wheeler agrees to hire a team of bounty hunters and give chase. Alexandra spots Callahan at the casino, and befriends a young cowboy, Yancy. She convinces him that her honor has been insulted. Yancy goes over to where Callahan is playing poker and a melee breaks out. He escapes in the confusion but she pursues Callahan on her own and meets up with him, and the two travel with Callahan's partner.

Later, in Callahan's cabin, Alexandra tries to kill him, but Callahan overpowers her and savagely beats her before raping her. Despite the savage beating leaving scars on her face, Alexandra decides to stay at the cabin. After nearly being killed by a mother bear protecting her cub, she is saved by Callahan, who shoots the adult bear. He saves the cub because it won't survive on its own. She falls in love with Callahan.

Now in love with the man who has killed her husband, she travels with Callahan and his partner, but Wheeler's posse is in pursuit. Wheeler's men are determined to collect that reward, and Callahan finds that he can't kill them all.

== Cast ==
- David Janssen as Diego Callahan
- Jean Seberg as Alexandra Mountford
- Lee J. Cobb as Duffy
- James Booth as Harry Wheeler
- Pedro Armendáriz Jr. as Juan
- David Carradine as David Mountford
- Bo Hopkins as Yancy
- Anne Revere as Crystal
- Richard Anderson as Officer
- Diane Ladd as Girl
- Matt Clark as The Jailer
- Richard Evans as Mulvey
- Cyril Delevanti as Old Man
- William Bryan as Dealer (credited as Bill Bryant)
- Robert Morgan as McIntyre (credited as Bob Morgan)
- Bucklind Berry as Young Man
- Steve Raines as The Bartender
- Ivan Scott as Sheriff
- David Carlile as Horseshoe Player
- Bill Catching as Gruber
- Michael Masters as Guard (credited as Mike Masters)
- Jim Gurley as Player #1
- Larry Finley as Player #2
- Marco Antonio Arzate as Indian
- Wallace Brooks as Dog Handler
- John McKee as Farmer
- Hugo Stiglitz as Man #1
- James Gammon as 1st Cowboy (credited as Jim Gammon)
- Gene Shane as 2nd Cowboy

== See also ==
- List of American films of 1970
