= Julian Barry =

American screenwriter and playwright (1930–2023)

- Born: Julian Barry Mendelsohn Jr. December 24, 1930; New York City, U.S.
- Died: July 25, 2023 (aged 92); Beverly Hills, California, U.S.
- Occupations: Screenwriter, playwright, author, theatre director
- Spouses: Sheila Ann Shulman; Patricia Jane Foley (died 1981); Laura Ziskin (m. 1978, divorced)
- Children: 4

Julian Barry (né Julian Barry Mendelsohn Jr.; December 24, 1930 – July 25, 2023) was an American screenwriter and playwright, best known for his Oscar-nominated script for the 1974 film Lenny about comedian Lenny Bruce. Barry adapted the script from his successful Broadway play of the same name. The film, directed by Bob Fosse and starring Dustin Hoffman and Valerie Perrine, was nominated for the so-called Oscar Grand Slam, one of some 40 films to be so honored.

Barry wrote or rewrote screenplays for several notable films including The River, Eyes of Laura Mars, and Rhinoceros, Me, Myself and I, and A Marriage - Georgia O'Keeffe and Alfred Stieglitz (PBS/American Playhouse Production). Barry appeared as himself in the film documentary Pablo, about the graphic artist and film director Pablo Ferro.

Barry's autobiography, My Night with Orson, was published on July 9, 2011, by CreateSpace Independent Publishing Platform (ISBN 978-1-4635-5134-6).

== Early life ==
Julian Barry Mendelsohn Jr. was born on December 24, 1930, in New York City to Jewish parents, the only child of Julian B. and Grace (née Fein) Mendelsohn. He was raised in the Riverdale neighborhood of The Bronx. He played saxophone for his high school band, and traveled to jazz clubs in New York City to hear jazz performed by Charlie Parker, Dizzy Gillespie, Miles Davis, Thelonious Monk and John Coltrane.

After high school, Barry attended Syracuse University in Syracuse, New York, where he majored in drama and performed in university productions with comedian Jerry Stiller. He was drafted into the U.S. Army during the Korean War and served until 1953.

== Early career ==
Barry was cast in the 1955 Orson Welles production of King Lear at New York City Center theater. He continued working on Broadway as an actor in the musical Shinbone Alley, where he was also stage manager, He also stage managed the Budd Schulberg treatment of The Disenchanted, about the real life adventures of F. Scott Fitzgerald. He stage managed seven other Broadway productions, appearing as an actor in several of them as well, and he worked in the Broadway theatre in this capacity through the mid sixties when he started writing full-time.

In 1969, Barry was hired by Columbia Pictures to write the screenplay for Lenny. The prospects for the project were reportedly harmed by the commercial success of Love Story, having created a demand for romantic films, which Lenny certainly was not. Barry suggested to theatre director Tom O'Horgan, who was fresh from his success with the musical Hair, that the Lenny screenplay be redone as a play and the play was a hit starring Cliff Gorman.

At the 47th Academy Awards in 1974, Lenny was honored with nominations in all five categories that constitute the Oscar Grand Slam, including a nomination for Best Adapted Screenplay for Barry. He was also nominated that year for a Writers Guild of America Award for Best Drama Adapted from Another Medium, as well as a Jeff Award for his directorial efforts on the Lenny stage show in Chicago.

In 1983, Barry wrote the book for Jean Seberg, a musical biography of the American actress and political activist who committed suicide in Paris in 1979. The production was directed by Peter Hall at London's National Theatre with music by Marvin Hamlisch. The production was a flop. Later he co-authored an opera with Peter Hall, Born Again at the Chichester Festival Theatre in England starring Mandy Patinkin and José Ferrer.

Barry ventured back into opera writing the libretto for Zyklon, an opera about the life of German-Jewish scientist Fritz Haber. The music was composed by the British composer Peter King.

== Personal life ==
Barry met his second wife, Patricia Foley when he hired her for a Chicago production of Guys and Dolls to play the role of Sister Sarah Brown, opposite Tony Bennett. Barry and Patricia were married three weeks later. They had three children: Sally, Michael, and Jennifer. Patricia died in November 1981 in a car accident.

Barry later married and divorced film producer Laura Ziskin, who died in 2011. They had a daughter, Julia (born 1983).

Barry died at his home in Beverly Hills, California, on July 25, 2023, at the age of 92, from complications of heart failure and kidney disease.

== Selected works ==
- Me, Myself and I (screenplay)
- A Marriage: Georgia O'Keeffe and Alfred Stieglitz (screenplay)
- The River (screenplay)
- Eyes of Laura Mars (screenplay)
- Lenny (play, 1974 screenplay)
- Rhinoceros (play, screenplay)
- Zyklon (opera, libretto)

== Other works ==
- Jean Seberg (biographical musical librettist)
- Born Again (opera; co-writer with Peter Hall)

== Awards and nominations ==
- Nomination, Academy Award for Best Adapted Screenplay (Lenny, 1974)
- Nomination, Writers Guild of America Award, Best Drama Adapted from Another Medium (Lenny, 1974)
- Nomination, Joseph Jefferson Award, Director - Play (Lenny, 1974)
- Drama Logue Awards in Los Angeles for both writing and directing the play The Reunification Hotel in 1999.

== See also ==
- Lenny (film)
- List of Big Five Academy Award winners and nominees
- 47th Academy Awards
- List of Mission: Impossible (1966 TV series) episodes
