= Saint Joan (1957 film) =

1957 film

Saint Joan Bernard Shaw's Saint Joan
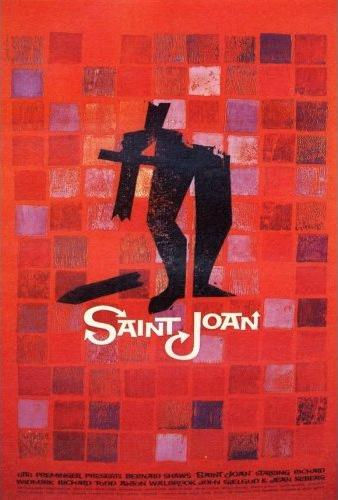
- Theatrical release poster designed by Saul Bass
- Directed by: Otto Preminger
- Screenplay by: Graham Greene
- Based on: Saint Joan by George Bernard Shaw
- Produced by: Otto Preminger; Douglas Peirce
- Starring: Jean Seberg; Richard Widmark; Richard Todd; Barry Jones; Anton Walbrook; John Gielgud; Felix Aylmer; Harry Andrews; Finlay Currie; Bernard Miles; Patrick Barr; Kenneth Haigh
- Cinematography: Georges Périnal
- Edited by: Helga Cranston
- Music by: Mischa Spoliansky
- Distributed by: United Artists
- Release date: 8 May 1957
- Running time: 110 minutes
- Countries: United Kingdom; United States
- Language: English
- Budget: $1 million
- Box office: US$250,000 (domestic)

Saint Joan (also called Bernard Shaw's Saint Joan) is a 1957 historical drama film adapted from the 1923 George Bernard Shaw play of the same title about the life of Joan of Arc. The restructured screenplay by Graham Greene, directed by Otto Preminger, begins with the play's last scene, which becomes the springboard for a long flashback, in which the main story is told.

This was the film debut of actress Jean Seberg, who won a talent search conducted by Preminger that reportedly tested more than 18,000 young women for the role.

== Plot ==
In 1456, Charles VII, experiences dreams in which he is visited by Joan of Arc, the former commander of his army, burned at the stake as a heretic twenty-five years earlier. In the dream he tells Joan that her case was retried and her sentence annulled. He recalls how she entered his life as a simple, seventeen-year-old peasant girl; how she heard the voices of Saints Catherine and Margaret telling her that she would lead the French army against the English at the siege of Orléans and be responsible for having the Dauphin crowned king at Reims Cathedral. When Joan arrives at the Dauphin's palace at Chinon she discovers that he is a childish weakling with no interest in fighting. After being tested by the members of the court, who conclude that she is mad, Joan imbues the Dauphin with her belief and fervor and he gives her command of the army.

Shortly thereafter, Joan witnesses the coronation of Charles. Although her military triumphs have made her popular with the masses, her voices, beliefs, self-confidence and apparent supernatural powers have given her fearful enemies in high places. Charles, who has no further use for her services, expects her to return to her father's farm. When Joan challenges Charles to retake Paris from the English, he tells her he would rather sign a treaty than fight. All refuse Joan's plea to march on Paris, and the archbishop warns her that if she defies her spiritual directors, the church will disown her. Nevertheless, Joan puts her faith in God and appeals to the common people to march on Paris. She is captured and handed over to the English. To assure that Joan will never again become a threat to England, the English commander hands her over to the Catholic Church to be tried for heresy. Joan spends four months in a cell and is visited frequently by the Inquisitor. The English become impatient with the delay in her prosecution and press for the trial to begin. Joan holds to her faith, as always, refusing to deny that the church is wiser than she or her voices.

In a moment of panic when she learns she is to be burned at the stake, and worn down by the constant pressures applied by the Inquisitor, Joan signs a document of recantation in which she confesses that she pretended to hear revelations from God and the saints in the belief that this will result in her freedom to return to her life as a peasant girl. When she learns that the sentence of the Inquisition is her perpetual, solitary imprisonment, Joan destroys the document, refusing to face a life away from nature, the life that opened her spirit to hear God and the saints. She now believes that God wants her to come to him through the ordeal of being burned at the stake. After Joan is excommunicated, the English commander, weary of the Church's endless and delaying rituals, decides that Joan can be executed long before the Vatican learns about it, and so orders his soldiers to drag her to the square to be burned. The Inquisitor chooses to look the other way and let the English burn her. Those who witness Joan's death are stricken with remorse. The King's dream continues as he and Joan are visited by other significant figures from her life. Growing weary of all the spirit visitors, Charles tells Joan he has dreamed of her long enough and returns to his bed and his troubled sleep.

== Cast ==
- Richard Widmark as The Dauphin, later Charles VII
- Jean Seberg as St. Joan of Arc
- Richard Todd as Dunois, Bastard of Orléans
- Anton Walbrook as Peter Cauchon, Bishop of Beauvais
- John Gielgud as Richard de Beauchamp, Earl of Warwick
- Felix Aylmer as Inquisitor
- Archie Duncan as Robert de Baudricourt
- Harry Andrews as John de Stogumber
- Margot Grahame as Duchesse de la Tremouille
- Barry Jones as De Courcelles
- Francis de Wolff as Georges de la Trémoille
- Finlay Currie as Archbishop of Rheims
- Victor Maddern as English Soldier
- Bernard Miles as Master Executioner
- David Oxley as Gilles de Rais ("Bluebeard")
- Patrick Barr as Captain La Hire

== Production ==
Richard Todd claims Preminger was courteous to him but Jean Seberg "had a dreadful time."

== Historical inaccuracies ==
- During and after Charles' coronation, the choral music, and later the organ music, is in the style of Handel and Bach, who lived and worked in the early 1700s.
- Some of the vocabulary is unusual - it is doubtful that the term "cowboy" was in use in 1300s France; the word "slut" was in use in the 1300s, but it meant an untidy man, or possibly floor dust. The phrase, "God is on the side of the big battalions," quoted in the film, was first said by Napoleon Bonaparte, more than four centuries after Joan.
- Richard de Beauchamp corrects the French bishop, defining the French legal court as a "Catholic court," as if it were the opposite of an English "Protestant court" (86 years before Protestantism was proclaimed by Martin Luther).
- In the ending scene the English refer explicitly to papal infallibility, a doctrine which would not be precisely defined until 1869.

== Critical reaction ==
Several reviews, including two in The Times, noted that Greene's condensation of the play resulted in

"some odd omissions, interpolations and additions" and that "the result is a certain scrappiness and confusion in the first half of the film in place of Shaw's slow and careful build-up."

Upon release of the film, Jean Seberg's performance as Joan was soundly panned, and Preminger was heavily criticised for casting an inexperienced unknown in a role which required her to act with veteran actors such as John Gielgud, Anton Walbrook, Felix Aylmer, and others. In his 1966 book A World on Film: Criticism and Comment, Stanley Kauffmann called Saint Joan a disaster.

In his 2002 New Biographical Dictionary of Film, David Thomson called the film "a shrewd and touching fusion of provincial America, rural France, and Shaw's notion of a fustian saint picking logic with kings and bishops... Even cropped and in armor, (Seberg) looked pretty and robust, and managed through her very disavowal of spirituality to bring odd conviction to the claims that she had heard voices."

== See also ==
- Cultural depictions of Joan of Arc
- List of American films of 1957
- List of historical drama films
