= List of Bob Hope Presents the Chrysler Theatre episodes =

This is a list of episodes of the television series Bob Hope Presents the Chrysler Theatre (1963–1967). The series aired on NBC Fridays at 8:30–9:30 pm (EST) for the first two seasons, before moving to Wednesdays at 9:00-10:00 pm (EST) during seasons 3 and 4. Some variety specials and comedic presentations (almost all starring Bob Hope or Bing Crosby) were aired under the modified title Chrysler presents A Bob Hope Comedy Special, or similar variations thereof. These are listed here in chronological order within each season, marked as Specials rather than a specific episode number. Some sources consider these episodes as part of the regular series; many do not.

Several episodes of this series were rerun from 1968 through 1972 under several different titles, and with Hope's introductions replaced by other hosts: NBC Comedy Playhouse (1968–1970, hosted by Monty Hall in 1968–69 and Jack Kelly in 1970), NBC Comedy Theater (1971–1972, hosted by Jack Kelly), NBC Adventure Theatre (1971–1972, hosted by Art Fleming in 1971 and Ed McMahon in 1972) and NBC Action Playhouse (1971–1972, hosted by Peter Marshall).

In syndication, the series was presented as Universal Star Time and Theatre of the Stars, minus Hope's opening and closing segments.

== Series overview ==
Season	Episodes	Originally released	
Season	Episodes	First released	Last released
1	26 + 6 specials	October 7, 1963	June 5, 1964
2	23 + 7 specials	October 2, 1964	June 4, 1965
3	25 + 6 specials	September 15, 1965	June 22, 1966
4	26	September 14, 1966	May 17, 1967

== Episodes ==
=== Season 1 (1963-64) ===
The show picked up eight Emmy nominations in its first season, winning three. The season overall was nominated for Outstanding Program Achievement in the Field of Drama. Other awards and nominations are listed within individual episode write-ups.

No. overall	No. in season	Title	Directed by	Written by	Original release date	Prod. code
1	1	"A Killing At Sundial"	Alex Segal	Rod Serling	October 4, 1963	Hovue 24003
A Native American seeks revenge on the man he holds responsible for his father's lynching. With Stuart Whitman and Angie Dickinson.
2	2	"Something About Lee Wiley"	Sydney Pollack	David Rayfiel	October 11, 1963	Hovue
A biopic of 1930s blues/jazz singer Lee Wiley. With Piper Laurie, Claude Rains and Steven Hill. Note: This episode received two Emmy nominations, with David Rayfiel nominated for Outstanding Writing Achievement in Drama - Original, and Sydney Pollack nominated for Outstanding Directorial Achievement in Drama.
3	3	"Seven Miles Of Bad Road"	Douglas Heyes	Douglas Heyes	October 18, 1963	Hovue
A sheriff's wife falls for a hitchhiker passing through town. With Jeffrey Hunter, Eleanor Parker and Neville Brand.
Special	Special	"Chrysler Presents a Bob Hope Variety Special"	Unknown	Unknown	October 25, 1963	TBA
Bob participates in sketches and comedy with Andy Griffith, Martha Raye, Jane Russell and Connie Haines, and welcomes Los Angeles Dodgers stars Sandy Koufax, Don Drysdale and Tommy Davis.
4	4	"Four Kings"	David Lowell Rich	Story by : Clifford Irving; Teleplay by : Mark Rodgers	November 1, 1963	TBA
During World War II, four prisoners are given an opportunity for a pardon if they can pull off a top secret espionage mission. With Peter Falk, Susan Strasberg, John Van Dreelen, Simon Oakland, Paul Lukas and Vito Scotti.
5	5	"One Day In The Life Of Ivan Denisovich"	Daniel Petrie	Based on the novel by : Alexander Solzhenitsyn; Teleplay by : Mark Rodgers	November 8, 1963	TBA
Siberia, 1951: a group of work camp prisoners attempt to better a previous single-day work record, so they can get transferred to a warmer climate. With Jason Robards and Albert Paulsen. Note: This episode received an Emmy Award, with Albert Paulsen winning for Outstanding Performance in a Supporting Role by an Actor.
6	6	"The House Next Door"	Jack Arnold	Albert E. Lewin & Burt Styler	November 15, 1963	Hovue
A man unknowingly buys a home next to a gangster. With Bing Crosby, Kathryn Crosby, Frank Albertson, Jill St. John, Harold J. Stone and Jesse White.
7	7	"The Fifth Passenger"	John Brahm	Based on the novel by : Edward Young; Teleplay by : John Gay	November 29, 1963	Hovue
A British Intelligence Officer begins to suspect secret information is being given to the Soviets by a decorated Naval war hero. With Dana Wynter, Mel Ferrer and Alan Napier.
8	8	"The Candidate"	Stuart Rosenberg	Based on a story by : Eugene Burdick; Teleplay by : Karl Miller	December 6, 1963	Hovue
A political campaign manager battles to save both the failing campaign and his collapsing marriage. With Milton Berle, Ruth Roman and Dina Merrill.
Special	Special	"Chrysler Presents a Bob Hope Comedy Special"	Unknown	Unknown	December 13, 1963	TBA
Jack Benny and Bing Crosby fill in for Bob, who is recovering from eye surgery. Crosby and Benny perform an opening piece and introduce sketches, with much of the material being repeated from earlier Hope specials. Hope is only seen in these pre-taped bits.
9	9	"It's Mental Work"	Alex March	Adapted from a short story by : John O'Hara; Teleplay by : Rod Serling	December 20, 1963	Hovue
A bartender sees a long-awaited chance to buy the bar where he works, but doesn't have the cash. With Lee J. Cobb, Harry Guardino and Gena Rowlands. Note: This episode received an Emmy Award, with Rod Serling winning for Outstanding Writing Achievement in Drama - Adaptation.
10	10	"Corridor 400"	Unknown	Mark Roberts	December 27, 1963	Hovue
An undercover FBI agent poses as a nightclub singer in an attempt to bring down the head of a narcoctics ring. With Suzanne Pleshette, Andrew Duggan, Theodore Bikel and Joseph Campanella. Note: Bob Hope was still recovering from eye surgery, so this episode is hosted by Ed McMahon.
11	11	"War Of Nerves"	Sydney Pollack	Based on the novel by : Paul Brickhill; Teleplay by : Mark Rodgers	January 3, 1964	Hovue
A Parisian student witnesses an assassination, and soon finds himself in mortal danger. With Louis Jourdan and Stephen Boyd.
12	12	"Runaway"	Paul Stewart	Based on a novel by : Thomas B. Dewey; Teleplay by : Leonard Kantor	January 10, 1964	Hovue
A woman tries to protect her musician boyfriend's very expensive guitar, which has been targeted by thieves. With Joey Heatherton, Keenan Wynn and Ellen Burstyn.
Special	Special	"Chrysler Presents a Bob Hope Christmas Special"	Unknown	Unknown	January 17, 1964	TBA
Highlights from Bob's annual Christmas visit to the troops overseas.
13	13	"The Seven Little Foys"	Jack Laird	Melville Shavelson	January 24, 1964	Morpics
The story of the Foy vaudeville family. Bob Hope had played Eddie Foy Sr. in the 1955 film of the same name. In this Chrysler Theatre presentation, Eddie Foy Jr. plays his own father (reprising the role he played in the 1942 film Yankee Doodle Dandy), Mickey Rooney plays George M. Cohan, and the Foy children are played by The Osmond Brothers.
14	14	"Two Is The Number"	Sydney Pollack	Franklin Barton	January 31, 1964	Hovue
A middle aged woman is accused of killing a hoodlum in his own home. With Shelley Winters and Martin Balsam. Note: This episode received an Emmy Award, with Shelley Winters winning for Outstanding Single Performance by an Actress in a Leading Role.
15	15	"A Wind Of Hurricane Force"	Unknown	Story by : A.E. Hotchner; Teleplay by : Mark Rodgers	February 7, 1964	Hovue
An American facing a firing squad in Cuba is temporarily rescued, but still has to evade a military manhunt. With Dana Andrews.
Special	Special	"Chrysler Presents a Bob Hope Comedy Special"	Unknown	Unknown	February 14, 1964	TBA
16	16	"Wake Up Darling"	Unknown	Alex Gottlieb	February 21, 1964	Morpics
An advertising executive is dismayed to find his wife has landed a leading role in a Broadway show that's overseen by a charismatic young playwright. With Barry Nelson, Janet Blair, Roddy McDowall, Ann B. Davis and Jack Albertson.
17	17	"The Meal Ticket"	Stuart Rosenberg	Story by : Budd Schulberg; Teleplay by : Harold Swanton	February 28, 1964	Hovue
A washed-up boxer tries to prevent his younger brother from entering the same profession, while unexpectedly finding romance. With Cliff Robertson, Janice Rule and Broderick Crawford.
18	18	"The Square Peg"	Richard Crenna	Bob Fisher & Arthur Marx	March 6, 1964	Hovue
A gangster hires a psychologist to oversee his hiring process and staffing. With Stanley Adams, Joanna Moore, Burgess Meredith, Sue Ane Langdon and Bob Cummings. Note: Originally scheduled for broadcast on November 22, 1963, but pre-empted for coverage of the assassination of John F. Kennedy.
19	19	"White Snow, Red Ice"	Unknown	Richard Fielder	March 13, 1964	Hovue
In Yugoslavia, a young woman tries to get an American to help her to defect to the US. This is the first of three episodes starring Jack Kelly as globe-trotting P.I. Fred Piper, all intended as pilots for a series that never materialized. With Senta Berger, Walter Matthau and Grace Lee Whitney. Note: Jack Kelly reprises his role as P.I. Fred Piper in season 2's "Double Jeopardy" and season 3's "One Embezzlement and Two Margaritas".
Special	Special	"Chrysler Presents a Bob Hope Comedy Special: Her School For Bachelors"	Unknown	Unknown	March 20, 1964	TBA
Billed as "Chrysler Presents a Bob Hope Comedy Special", but presented as an hour-long story, not a variety episode. The publisher of a men's magazine is publicly denounced by a political candidate who he is secretly supporting. With Bob Hope, Eva Marie Saint, and Louis Nye.
20	20	"A Slow Fade to Black"	Roy Winston	Rod Serling	March 27, 1964	Hovue 24040
A movie executive who has built up his studio from nothing now faces being pushed out of his own company. With Rod Steiger, Robert Culp and Sally Kellerman. Notes: 1) Additional film footage was later added to this episode, which was released theatrically as "The Movie Maker". 2) This episode received an Emmy nomination, with Rod Steiger nominated for Outstanding Single Performance by an Actor in a Leading Role.
21	21	"A Case Of Armed Robbery"	Herschel Daugherty	Franklin Barton	April 3, 1964	Hovue
A bitter, alienated misfit plans to rob a gas station. With Anthony Franciosa, Pat O'Brien and Ed Asner.
Special	Special	"Chrysler Presents a Bob Hope Comedy Special"	Jack Shea	Lester White, John Rapp, Mort Lachman, Bill Larkin	April 17, 1964	TBA
Bob welcomes Tony Randall, Martha Raye, and Jack Jones. Sketches include a spoof of the 1963 movie Tom Jones. Note: This episode received an Emmy nomination, with Bob Hope nominated for Outstanding Individual Achievement in Entertainment - Actors and Performers.
22	22	"Time For Elizabeth"	Ezra Stone	Groucho Marx & Norman Krasna based on their play	April 24, 1964	Morpics
After 28 years working for a tyrannical boss, a man decides to retire to Florida. With Groucho Marx and Kathryn Eames.
23	23	"The Game With Glass Pieces"	Stuart Rosenberg	Howard Rodman	May 1, 1964	Hovue
An actor deals with both professional and personal frustrations. With Darren McGavin, Madlyn Rhue, Arte Johnson, Don Gordon and Diane Ladd.
24	24	"The Command"	Fielder Cook	Rod Serling	May 22, 1964	Hovue 24049
Korea, 1951: a military unit is ordered to hold a key strategic position, even though it is certain to result in their deaths. With Robert Stack, Andrew Duggan, Ed Binns, and Milton Selzer.
25	25	"The Sojourner"	Stuart Rosenberg	Based on the story "The Ballad of the Sad Cafe" by : Carson McCullers; Teleplay by : Stirling Silliphant	May 29, 1964	Hovue
A foreign correspondent recalls the events that led to the end of his marriage. With Efrem Zimbalist, Jr., Vera Miles, Herschel Bernardi and Howard Duff.
26	26	"Echoes Of Evil"	Fielder Cook	Franklin Barton	June 5, 1964	Hovue
A former crime boss, now retired and reformed, is under pressure to testify against his former associates. With Barry Sullivan, Nehemiah Persoff and Joan Hackett.

=== Season 2 (1964–65) ===
Though no individual episode or performance was nominated for an Emmy during season 2, the season did receive an overall Emmy nomination, for Outstanding Program Achievement in Entertainment.

No. overall	No. in season	Title	Directed by	Written by	Original release date	Prod. code
27	1	"Think Pretty"	Jack Arnold	Jerry Belson & Garry Marshall	October 2, 1964	Hovue
A record company executive will stop at nothing to sign a star comedian in this musical comedy. With Fred Astaire and Barrie Chase.
28	2	"Murder In The First"	Sydney Pollack	Based on the non-fiction book Death and the Supreme Court by : E. Barrett Prettyman Jr. Teleplay by : Stirling Silliphant	October 9, 1964	Hovue
A Supreme Court justice must decide if a convicted murderer's rights have been violated. With Bobby Darin, Janet Leigh, Lloyd Bochner, and Ivan Dixon.
Special	Special	"Chrysler Presents a Bob Hope Comedy Special: Have Girls, Will Travel"	Unknown	Unknown	October 16, 1964	TBA
Billed as "Chrysler Presents a Bob Hope Comedy Special", but presented as an hour-long story, not a variety episode. In the old west, a marriage broker and a stable of women travel from town to town matching up brides and grooms. With Bob Hope, Lucille Ball, Jill St. John and a cameo from Jack Benny.
29	3	"The Turncoat"	Ron Winston	Mark Rodgers & John Joseph	October 23, 1964	TBA
An American who has defected to China returns to the US with forged identity papers, and a plan to spy on a missile plant. With George Hamilton IV, Margaret O'Brien, Carroll O'Connor, and Jack Weston.
30	4	"The Timothy Heist"	Rod Amateau	Based on a short story by : John Haase; Teleplay by : Philip Davis & David Davis	October 30, 1964	Hovue
A billionaire makes plans to steal one of the world's great art treasures. With Art Carney and Spring Byington.
31	5	"Out On The Outskirts Of Town"	Unknown	William Inge	November 6, 1964	Hovue
A socialite and a former baseball star endure a stormy relationship. With Anne Bancroft and Jack Warden.
Special	Special	"Chrysler Presents a Bob Hope Thanksgiving Special"	Unknown	Unknown	November 20, 1964	TBA
Bob welcomes Donald O'Connor, Richard Chamberlain, Trini Lopez, Annette Funicello and Stella Stevens for an hour of holiday sketches and songs.
32	6	"Parties To The Crime"	Paul Stanley	William Wood	November 27, 1964	Hovue
An ex-con is spending so much time in church, he's suspected of using the facilities to plan a robbery. With Jeffrey Hunter, Sally Kellerman and Darren McGavin.
33	7	"Mr. Biddle's Crime Wave"	Lawrence Dobkin	Nathaniel Curtis	December 4, 1964	Morpics
A remarkably accident-prone research scientist leaves a trail of comic disaster wherever he goes. With Roddy McDowall, Shari Lewis, Patricia Crowley and Lloyd Nolan.
34	8	"The Shattered Glass"	Alex March	Based on the novel by : Jean Ariss; Teleplay by : Rita Lakin & Loren Dayle	December 11, 1964	Hovue
An architect's life collapsed when the love of his life married another man. Now she's widowed, and he believes he has a second chance with her. With William Shatner and Shirley Jones.
Special	Special	"Chrysler Presents a Bob Hope Comedy Special"	Unknown	Unknown	December 18, 1964	TBA
35	9	"Clash of Cymbals"	Robert Ellis Miller	Elick Moll	December 25, 1964	Hovue
An aspiring pianist competes for a scholarship that is being judged by her current flame. With Laura Devon, Jack Klugman and Louis Jourdan.
36	10	"Double Jeopardy"	Robert Stevens	Richard Fielder	December 15, 1961	Hovue
Private eye Fred Piper tries to track down a missing millionaire, in this second of three appearances by Jack Kelly as Piper. With Lauren Bacall, Zsa Zsa Gabor, Hugh O'Brian, Lee Meriwether and Tom Poston.
Special	Special	"Chrysler Presents the Bob Hope Christmas Show"	Jack Shea	Mort Lachman, Bill Larkin, Lester White, John Rapp, Gig Henry, Charles Lee	January 15, 1965	TBA
Highlights from Bob's tour to entertain the troops in Southeast Asia. With Jill St. John, Janis Paige, Anna Maria Alberghetti and Jerry Colonna.
37	11	"Exit From A Plane In Flight"	Ron Winston	Rod Serling	January 22, 1965	Hovue 25532
A former paratrooper, now a movie star, returns to an army base with a publicity stunt in mind. With Hugh O'Brian, Lloyd Bridges, Constance Towers and Sorrell Booke.
38	12	"The Loving Cup"	Robert Ellis Miller	Richard Fielder	January 29, 1965	Hovue 25549
A yachtsman tries to get financial backing to enter a race. With Lee Marvin, Polly Bergen and Patrick O'Neal.
39	13	"The Fliers"	Sydney Pollack	David Rayfiel	February 5, 1965	Hovue 25516
The adventures of two Americans serving with the British RAF during World War I. With John Cassavetes, Chester Morris, Dabney Coleman and Carol Lynley.
Special	Special	"Chrysler Presents a Bob Hope Comedy Special"	Unknown	Unknown	February 12, 1965	TBA
40	14	"Cops and Robbers"	Unknown	Eric Bercovici & Jud Taylor	February 19, 1965	Morpics
Bored retirees decide to plan a robbery, simply for kicks. With Claude Rains and Bert Lahr.
41	15	"Terror Island"	John Brahm	Chester Krumholz	February 26, 1965	Hovue 25547
Newlyweds visit the island where the husband grew up with his foster family ... and where the memory of his first wife is still very strong. With Ginger Rogers, Carol Lawrence, Katharine Ross, Donnelly Rhodes and Abraham Sofaer
42	16	"The War and Eric Kurtz"	Tom Gries	Story by : Gene L. Coon; Teleplay by : Howard Browne	March 5, 1965	Hovue 25557
A former POW struggles with mental health issues. With Martin Milner, Warren Oates and Lloyd Bochner.
43	17	"In Any Language"	Lawrence Dobkin	Henry Garson & Edmund Beloin	March 12, 1965	Morpics
An actress arrives in Rome determined to win back her husband, and to land a role in a prestigious Italian art film. With Nanette Fabray, John Forsythe and Ricardo Montalbán.
44	18	"Perilous Times"	Ralph Senesky	Story by : Martha Gelhorn; Teleplay by : Theodore Apstein & Harry Brown	March 19, 1965	Hovue 25560
During the height of World War II in Europe, a bittersweet love story unfolds. With Peter Falk and Diane Baker.
Special	Special	"Chrysler Presents a Bob Hope Comedy Special"	Unknown	Unknown	March 26, 1965	TBA
45	19	"Memorandum For A Spy (Part 1)"	Stuart Rosenberg	Story by : Ellis St. Joseph; Teleplay by : Robert L. Joseph	April 2, 1965	Hovue
Both the US and the USSR have plans for an alcoholic CIA agent, who is busy trying to put his personal life back together. With Robert Stack, Victor Buono, John Van Dreelen, Felicia Farr and Michael Constantine.
46	20	"Memorandum For A Spy (Part 2)"	Stuart Rosenberg	Story by : Ellis St. Joseph; Teleplay by : Robert L. Joseph	April 9, 1965	Hovue
See above.
Special	Special	"Chrysler Presents a Bob Hope Comedy Special"	Unknown	Unknown	April 16, 1965	TBA
47	21	"A Time For Killing"	Robert Gist	Story by : William Hardy; Teleplay by : Edward Anhalt	April 30, 1965	Hovue 25545
With the Japanese about to surrender, a WWII submarine commander tries to avoid combat to spare the lives of his men -- but his executive officer is determined to engage the enemy. With George C. Scott.
48	22	"Escape Into Jeopardy"	Paul Stanley	Dean Riesner	May 28, 1965	Hovue 25554
U.S. Intelligence is forced to rely on an ex-con in their plan to stop the Nazis from flooding the US with impeccable counterfeit currency. With James Franciscus and Werner Klemperer.
49	23	"Simon Says Get Married"	Unknown	Bernard Slade	June 4, 1965	Morpics
A shy, stammering scientist decides to let a computer match him with an appropriate romantic partner. With Bob Newhart, Martin Milner, Dorothy Provine, Joanna Barnes and Kathleen Freeman.

=== Season 3 (1965–66) ===
The series received six Emmy nominations during season 3, winning four. Nominations and awards are identified in the episode write-ups below.

No. overall	No. in season	Title	Directed by	Written by	Original release date	Prod. code
50	1	"The Game"	Sidney Pollack	S. Lee Pogostin	September 15, 1965	Hovue
A businessman decides to take a chance on the casino gambling tables, despite being broke. With Cliff Robertson, Dina Merrill, Maurice Evans, Nehemiah Persoff and Cyril Delevanti. Note: This episode received three Emmy nominations, winning two, with Sydney Pollack winning for Outstanding Directorial Achievement in Drama, Cliff Robertson winning for Outstanding Single Performance by an Actor in a Leading Role in a Drama, and S. Lee Pogostin nominated for Outstanding Writing Achievement in Drama.
51	2	"The Crime"	Ron Winston	Based on the novel by : Stephen Longstreet; Teleplay by : Mark Rodgers & George Loring	September 22, 1965	Hovue
A prosecuting attorney obsessively builds a murder case against his former lover. With Jack Lord, Dana Wynter, Pat O'Brien and Sheree North
Special	Special	"Chrysler Presents a Bob Hope Comedy Special"	Unknown	Unknown	September 29, 1965	TBA
52	3	"March From Camp Tyler"	Unknown	Unknown	October 6, 1965	Hovue
In the old west, a military man is ordered to lead a dangerous trek across land controlled by hostile natives. With Peter Lawford.
53	4	"Kicks"	Ron Winston	Arnold Perl	October 13, 1965	Hovue
A model finds life dull without a constant sense of danger, and graduates from high-risk gambling to planning a murder. With Melodie Johnson, Mickey Rooney, Jack Weston, Harold J. Stone and Don Gordon.
Special	Special	"Chrysler Presents a Bob Hope Comedy Special"	Unknown	Unknown	October 20, 1965	TBA
54	5	"Back To Back"	Unknown	Unknown	October 27, 1965	Hovue
Two people pretend to be a happily married couple, so that they will qualify to work as domestics. With Shelley Winters and Jack Hawkins. Note: This episode received an Emmy nomination, with Shelley Winters nominated for Outstanding Single Performance by an Actress in a Leading Role in a Drama.
55	6	"Mister Governess"	Jess Oppenheimer	Elroy Schwartz & Jess Oppenheimer	November 10, 1965	Morpics
Looking for a cheap way to get to Europe to be with his fiancee, a young man decides to dress up as a woman and take a job as a nanny with a well-travelled family. With Tom Tryon and Carol Lawrence.
56	7	"Russian Roulette"	David Butler	Story by : Bob Hope; Teleplay by : Albert E. Lewis & Burt Styler	November 17, 1965	Morpics
A comedian bound for Moscow finds himself caught up in international intrigue. With Bob Hope, Jill St. John, Victor Buono and Don Rickles.
57	8	"Highest Fall Of All"	Robert Ellis Miller	Stirling Silliphant	December 1, 1965	Hovue
Increasingly depressed as his life spins out of control, a stuntman volunteers to take a suicidal on-camera jump from a bridge. With Stuart Whitman, Joan Hackett, Gary Merrill and Steve Ihnat.
58	9	"The Betrayal"	Paul Almond	Based on a novel by : Henry Kreisel; Teleplay by : Alvin Goldman	December 8, 1965	TBA
Two friends both love the same woman. With Don Harron, Helen Conway-Marmo and Budd Knapp.
Special	Special	"Chrysler Presents a Bob Hope Christmas Variety Special"	Mort Lachman	Lester White, John Rapp, Mort Lachman, Gig Henry, Bill Larkin, Charles Lee	December 22, 1965	TBA
Bob welcomes Vic Damone, Phyllis Diller, Joey Heatherton, Tippi Hedren, and Miss World 1966 Reita Faria for an evening of holiday sketches and songs.
59	10	"The Admiral"	Leon Benson	Hank Searls	December 29, 1965	Hovue
An admiral and his estranged fighter pilot son try to reestablish their relationship after the death of the admiral's wife. With Robert Young and Robert Reed.
60	11	"The Enemy On The Beach"	Stuart Rosenberg	Herman Miller	January 5, 1966	Hovue
In Ireland during WWII, two mines wash up on a beach, and a fractious pair of mismatched demolition experts race to disarm them. With Robert Wagner, James Donald and Sally Ann Howes.
Special	Special	"Chrysler Presents the Bob Hope Vietnam Christmas Show"	Unknown	Unknown	January 19, 1966	TBA
Highlights of Bob Hope's live Christmas show for US troops overseas. Note: This episode received an Emmy award for Outstanding Variety Special.
61	12	"After The Lion, Jackals"	Jack Laird	Story by : Jack Laird; Teleplay by : Stanford Whitmore	January 26, 1966	Hovue
A woman falls for and marries her boss, a cynical novelist, only to find a better match almost immediately after. With Suzanne Pleshette.
62	13	"When Hell Froze"	William Hale	Story by : Wilbur Daniel Steele; Teleplay by : Alvin Sapinsley	February 2, 1966	Hovue
In 1919, a housewife performs an act of kindness to a WWI vet, but it leads to tragic consequences. With Leslie Nielsen, Jane Wyman and Martin Milner.
63	14	"A Small Rebellion"	Stuart Rosenberg	S. Lee Pogostin	February 9, 1966	Hovue
A playwright refuses to change a single word of his latest work, even to please the actress who could make the play a box office hit. With Simone Signoret, George Maharis and Sam Levene. Note: This episode received an Emmy award, with Simone Signoret winning for Outstanding Single Performance by an Actress in a Leading Role in a Drama.
Special	Special	"Chrysler Presents a Bob Hope Comedy Special"	Unknown	Unknown	February 16, 1966	TBA
64	15	"Wind Fever"	Unknown	Ernest Kinoy	March 2, 1966	Hovue
The daughter of a powerful Malaysian merchant succumbs to a tropical disease, which leads to a malpractice suit against an American medical scientist. With John Cassavetes, William Shatner, Pippa Scott, Keye Luke, George Takei, Wilfrid Hyde-White and Abraham Sofaer.
65	16	"Guilty or Not Guilty"	David Lowell Rich	Story by : Roland Kibbee; Teleplay by : "Guthrie Lamb"	March 9, 1966	TBA
An assistant D.A. organizes a citizens' committee to patrol his crime-ridden neighborhood. With Robert Ryan, Leslie Nielsen, Diana Hyland, Richard Beymer, Robert Duvall and Pippa Scott.
66	17	"Tell Them The Streets Are Dancing"	Ronald Weyman	Phillip Hersch	March 16, 1966	TBA
Coroner Dr. Steve Wojeck investigates the death of an underground construction worker, and the working conditions that may have been responsible for his death. With John Vernon, Patricia Collins, Ted Follows and Carl Banas. Note: Produced and set in Toronto, this is the pilot for the Canadian series Wojeck, which premiered on CBC Television in September, 1966.
67	18	"Brilliant Benjamin Boggs"	Jack Laird	Nathaniel Curtis	March 30, 1966	Morpics
A big game hunter sets her sights on marriage to an awkward scientist -- even though he's already married. With Donald O'Connor, Broderick Crawford, Dick Sargent and Jean Hale.
68	19	"The Sister and the Savage"	Gerald Mayer	Based on a novel by : Thomas B. Dewey; Teleplay by : Edward De Blasio & Dick Nelson	April 6, 1966	Hovue
A nun attempts to convince a rock and roll musician to go through with a potentially risky operation. With Connie Francis and James Farentino.
Special	Special	"Chrysler Presents a Bob Hope Variety Special"	Unknown	Unknown	April 13, 1966	TBA
Bob welcomes Phyllis Diller, Pete Fountain, Jonathan Winters and Lee Marvin for a program of songs and sketches, including a spoof of the 1960 film The Magnificent Seven.
69	20	"The Faceless Man"	Unknown	Unknown	May 4, 1966	Hovue
An undercover agent must infiltrate the organization responsible for killing at least four American sailors. With Jack Lord, Shirley Knight, Mercedes McCambridge and Jack Weston.
70	21	"Holloway's Daughters"	Ida Lupino	Burt Styler	May 11, 1966	Morpics
A private detective working on a robbery investigation is assisted by his family -- even when he'd rather tackle the case on his own. With David Wayne, Robert Young, Brooke Bundy, Barbara Hershey and Ellen Corby.
71	22	"One Embezzlement and Two Margaritas"	Robert Ellis Miller	Story by : Harry Brown; Teleplay by : Luther Davis	May 18, 1966	Hovue
Socialite turned private investigator Fred Piper is hired to find a missing bank president. Jack Kelly makes his third (and final) appearance as Piper; also with Michael Rennie and Antoinette Bower.
72	23	"Runaway Boy"	Stuart Rosenberg	Story by : Ben Masselink; Teleplay by : Ben Masselink and Tom Mankiewicz	May 25, 1966	Hovue
Disillusioned with life in the city, a young woman returns to her small home town. With Carol Lynley, Robert Wagner and Lola Albright.
73	24	"Shipwrecked"	Harvey Hart	Richard Sherman	June 8, 1966	Hovue
A sailor and a widow are the sole survivors of a shipwreck, and end up stranded on a deserted island. With Hope Lange and Jason Robards.
74	25	"In Pursuit of Excellence"	John Cassavetes	John Cassavetes	June 22, 1966	Hovue
A college athlete finds it increasingly difficult to keep up with all the demands on his time. With Glenn Corbett and Ed Begley.
