= 16th Primetime Emmy Awards =

1964 American television programming awards

- Date: May 25, 1964
- Location: Hollywood Palladium, Los Angeles, California
- Presented by: Academy of Television Arts and Sciences
- Hosted by: Joey Bishop; E. G. Marshall

Highlights
- Most awards: The Dick Van Dyke Show (5)
- Most nominations: Bob Hope Presents the Chrysler Theatre (7)
- Outstanding Program Achievement in the Field of Comedy: The Dick Van Dyke Show
- Outstanding Program Achievement in the Field of Drama: The Defenders
- Outstanding Program Achievement in the Field of Music: The Bell Telephone Hour
- Outstanding Program Achievement in the Field of Variety: The Danny Kaye Show
- The Program of the Year: The Making of the President 1960

Television/radio coverage
- Network: NBC

The 16th Emmy Awards, later known as the 16th Primetime Emmy Awards, were presented on May 25, 1964. The ceremony was hosted by Joey Bishop and E. G. Marshall. Winners are listed in bold and series' networks are in parentheses.

The top shows of the night were repeat winners. The Defenders won its third consecutive Drama Emmy, while The Dick Van Dyke Show won its second straight Comedy Emmy. The Dick Van Dyke Show tied the record (since broken) for most major category wins, with five.

== Winners and nominees ==
=== Programs ===
Programs
**Outstanding Program Achievement in the Field of Comedy**: **The Dick Van Dyke Show (CBS)**; The Bill Dana Show (NBC); The Farmer's Daughter (ABC); McHale's Navy (ABC); That Was The Week That Was (NBC)	**Outstanding Program Achievement in the Field of Drama**: **The Defenders (CBS)**; Bob Hope Presents the Chrysler Theatre (NBC); East Side/West Side (CBS); Mr. Novak (NBC); The Richard Boone Show (NBC)
**Outstanding Program Achievement in the Field of Variety**: **The Danny Kaye Show (CBS)**; The Andy Williams Show (NBC); The Garry Moore Show (CBS); The Judy Garland Show (CBS); The Tonight Show Starring Johnny Carson (NBC)	**Outstanding Program Achievement** **in the Field of News Commentary or Public Affairs**: **NBC White Paper (NBC)**; The American Revolution of '63 (NBC); CBS Reports (CBS); Chronicle (CBS); Town Meeting of the World (CBS)
**Outstanding Achievement in the Field of Documentary Programs**: **The Making of the President 1960 (ABC)**; The DuPont Show of the Week (NBC); Greece: The Golden Age (NBC); The Kremlin (NBC); Saga of Western Man (ABC); The Twentieth Century (CBS)	**Outstanding Program Achievement in the Field of Children's Programming**: **Discovery (ABC)**; Exploring (NBC); Mutual of Omaha's Wild Kingdom (NBC); NBC Children's Theatre (NBC); Science All-Stars (ABC)
**The Program of the Year**: **The Making of the President 1960 (ABC)**; The American Revolution of '63 (NBC); The Defenders (CBS): "Blacklist"; The Kremlin (NBC); Town Meeting of the World (CBS)

=== Acting ===
==== Lead performances ====
Acting
**Outstanding Continued Performance by an Actor in a Series (Lead)**: **Dick Van Dyke as Rob Petrie in The Dick Van Dyke Show (CBS)**; Richard Boone as Judge in The Richard Boone Show (NBC); David Janssen as Dr. Richard Kimble in The Fugitive (ABC); Dean Jagger as Principal Albert Vane in Mr. Novak (NBC); George C. Scott as Neil Brock in East Side/West Side (CBS)	**Outstanding Continued Performance by an Actress in a Series (Lead)**: **Mary Tyler Moore as Laura Petrie in The Dick Van Dyke Show (CBS)**; Shirley Booth as Hazel Burke in Hazel (NBC); Patty Duke as Cathy Lane in The Patty Duke Show (ABC); Irene Ryan as Granny in The Beverly Hillbillies (CBS); Inger Stevens as Katy Holstrum in The Farmer's Daughter (ABC)

==== Supporting performances ====
**Outstanding Performance in a Supporting Role by an Actor**: **Albert Paulsen as Lt. Volkoval in Bob Hope Presents the Chrysler Theatre (NBC) (Episode: "One Day in the Life of Ivan Denisovich")**; Sorrell Booke as Julius Orloff in Dr. Kildare (NBC) (Episode: "What's God to Julius?"); Conlan Carter as Doc in Combat! (ABC) (Episode: "The Hostages"); Carl Lee as Lonnie Hill in The Doctors and the Nurses (CBS) (Episode: "Express Shop from Lenox Avenue")	**Outstanding Performance in a Supporting Role by an Actress**: **Ruth White as Shelagh Mangan in Hallmark Hall of Fame (NBC) (Episode: "Little Moon of Alban")**; Martine Bartlett as Miranda Ledoux Porter in Arrest and Trial (ABC) (Episode: "Journey Into Darkness"); Anjanette Comer as Annabelle Selinsky on Arrest and Trial (ABC)(Episode: "Journey Into Darkness"); Rose Marie as Sally Rogers in The Dick Van Dyke Show (CBS); Claudia McNeil as Mrs. Hill in The Doctors and the Nurses (CBS)(Episode: "Express Shop from Lenox Avenue")

==== Single performances ====
**Outstanding Single Performance by an Actor in a Leading Role**: **Jack Klugman as Joe Larch in The Defenders (CBS): "Blacklist"**; James Earl Jones as Joe in East Side/West Side (CBS): "Who Do You Kill?"; Roddy McDowall as Paul LeDoux in Arrest and Trial (ABC): "Journey into Darkness"; Jason Robards as Abraham Lincoln in Hallmark Hall of Fame (NBC): "Abe Lincoln in Illinois"; Rod Steiger as Mike Kirsch in Bob Hope Presents the Chrysler Theatre (NBC): "A Slow Fade to Black"; Harold J. Stone as Elihu Kaminsky in The Doctors and the Nurses (CBS): "Nurse is a Feminine Noun"	**Outstanding Single Performance by an Actress in a Leading Role**: **Shelley Winters as Jenny Dworak in Bob Hope Presents the Chrysler Theatre (NBC): "Two Is The Number"**; Ruby Dee as Jenny Bishop in The Doctors and the Nurses (CBS): "Express Stop from Lennox Avenue"; Bethel Leslie as Ellen Dudley in The Richard Boone Show (NBC): "Statement of Fact"; Jeanette Nolan as Jessie McCoony in The Richard Boone Show (NBC): "Vote No on 11!"; Diana Sands as Ruth in East Side/West Side (CBS): "Who Do You Kill?"

=== Directing ===
Directing
**Outstanding Directorial Achievement in Comedy**: **The Dick Van Dyke Show (CBS) – Jerry Paris**; The Beverly Hillbillies (CBS) – Richard Whorf; The Farmer's Daughter (ABC) – Paul Nickell, William D. Russell and Don Taylor; McHale's Navy (ABC) – Sidney Lanfield	**Outstanding Directorial Achievement in Variety or Music**: **The Danny Kaye Show (CBS) – Robert Scheerer**; The Andy Williams Show (NBC) – Bob Henry; The Bell Telephone Hour (NBC) – Clark Jones and Sid Smith; New York Philharmonic Young People's Concerts with Leonard Bernstein (CBS) – Roger Englander; That Was the Week That Was (NBC) – Marshall Jamison
**Outstanding Directorial Achievement in Drama**: **East Side/West Side (CBS): "Who Do You Kill?" – Tom Gries**; Bob Hope Presents the Chrysler Theatre (NBC): "Something About Lee Wiley" – Sydney Pollack; The Defenders (CBS): "Blacklist" – Stuart Rosenberg; The Defenders (CBS): "Moment of Truth" – Paul Bogart; Hallmark Hall of Fame (NBC): "The Patriots" – George Schaefer

=== Writing ===
Writing
**Outstanding Writing Achievement in Drama – Adaptation**: **Bob Hope Presents the Chrysler Theatre (NBC): "It's Mental Work" – Rod Serling**; The Alfred Hitchcock Hour (CBS): "The Jar" – James Bridges; Hallmark Hall of Fame (NBC): "The Patriots" – Robert Hartung; The Richard Boone Show (NBC): "The Hooligan" – Walter Newman	**Outstanding Writing Achievement in Drama – Original**: **The Defenders (CBS): "Blacklist" – Ernest Kinoy**; Bob Hope Presents the Chrysler Theatre (NBC): "Something About Lee Wiley" – David Rayfiel; Breaking Point (ABC): "And James Was A Very Small Snail" – Allan Sloane; Dr. Kildare (NBC): "What's God to Julius?" – Adrian Spies; East Side/West Side (CBS): "Who Do You Kill?" – Arnold Perl
**Outstanding Writing Achievement in Comedy or Variety**: **The Dick Van Dyke Show (CBS) – Carl Reiner, Sam Denoff and Bill Persky**; The Danny Kaye Show (CBS) – Herbert Baker, Mel Tolkin, Ernest Chambers, Saul Ilson, Sheldon Keller, Paul Mazursky, Larry Tucker, Gary Belkin and Larry Gelbart; The Farmer's Daughter (ABC) – Steve Gethers, Jerry Davis, Lee Loeb and John McGreevey; That Was the Week That Was (NBC) – Robert Emmett, Gerald Gardner, Saul Turteltaub, David Panich, Tony Webster, Thomas Meehan and Ed Sherman

== Most major nominations ==
Networks with multiple major nominations (Note: "Major" constitutes the categories listed above: Program, Acting, Directing, and Writing. Does not include the technical categories.)
Network	Number of Nominations
NBC	39
CBS	36
ABC	18

Programs with multiple major nominations
Program	Category	Network	Number of Nominations
Bob Hope Presents the Chrysler Theatre	Drama	NBC	7
The Defenders	Drama	CBS	6
The Dick Van Dyke Show	Comedy	CBS	6
East Side/West Side	Drama	CBS	6
The Richard Boone Show	Drama	NBC	5
The Doctors and the Nurses	Drama	CBS	4
The Farmer's Daughter	Comedy	ABC	4
Hallmark Hall of Fame	Drama	NBC	4
That Was The Week That Was	Comedy	NBC	4
Arrest and Trial	Drama	ABC	3
The Danny Kaye Show	Variety	CBS	3
The American Revolution of '63	News Commentary/Public Affairs	NBC	2
The Andy Williams Show	Variety	NBC	2
The Beverly Hillbillies	Comedy	CBS	2
Dr. Kildare	Drama	NBC	2
The Kremlin	Documentary	NBC	2
The Making of the President 1960	Documentary	ABC	2
McHale's Navy	Comedy	ABC	2
Mr. Novak	Drama	NBC	2
Town Meeting of the World	News Commentary/Public Affairs	CBS	2

== Most major awards ==
Networks with multiple major awards
Network	Number of Awards
CBS	11
NBC	5
ABC	3

Programs with multiple major awards
Program	Category	Network	Number of Awards
The Dick Van Dyke Show	Comedy	CBS	5
Bob Hope Presents the Chrysler Theatre	Drama	NBC	3
The Defenders	Drama	CBS	3
The Danny Kaye Show	Variety	CBS	2
The Making of the President, 1960	Documentary	ABC	2
