= A Slow Fade to Black =

- Bob Hope Presents the Chrysler Theatre episode
- Sally Kellerman and Rod Steiger in A Slow Fade to Black
- Episode no.: Season 1 Episode 23
- Directed by: Roy Winston
- Written by: Rod Serling
- Original air date: March 27, 1964
- Running time: 50:55

Guest appearances
- Rod Steiger as Michael Kirsch; Sally Kellerman as Jerrie Kirsch; Robert Culp as Peter Furgatch

Episode chronology
← Previous "Her School for Bachelors"	Next → "A Case of Armed Robbery"

"A Slow Fade to Black" was an American television film broadcast by NBC on March 27, 1964, as part of the television series, Bob Hope Presents the Chrysler Theatre. Rod Serling wrote the screenplay, and Benny Carter provided the music. Rod Steiger starred and was nominated for an Emmy for outstanding performance by an actor in a leading role.

== Plot ==
Mike Kirsch (played by Rod Steiger) is the once-powerful head of Globe-Kirsch studios whose last six films have all lost money. His assistant Peter Furgatch (played by Robert Culp) conveys a message that the studio's directors want him to resign. Kirsch tries to secure his control of the studio with the shares owned by his wife (played by Anna Lee) and his rebellious daughter (played by Sally Kellerman). His daughter refuses to support him.

At a meeting of the board of directors, Kirsch pitches a spectacular new movie but is asked for his resignation. At a dinner honoring Kirsch as "Producer of the Year", Furgatch informs him that he has been appointed as the new head of the studio. Kirsch announces his resignation at the dinner. He later cries as he watches his early movies.

== Cast ==
The cast included performances by:

- Rod Steiger as Mike Kirsch
- Sally Kellerman as Jerrie Kirsch
- Robert Culp as Peter Furgatch
- Bob Hope as Host
- James Dunn as Russ Landers
- Anna Lee as Paula Kirsch
- Woodrow Parfrey as Kessler
- Simon Scott as Henderson
- Marian Moses as The Secretary
- Scott Elliott as Grannigan
- Dennis McCarthy as The Man
- Clegg Hoyt as The Guard
- Leon Belasco as Robbins
- Sharon Farrell as Melissa

== Production ==
The production was broadcast by NBC on March 27, 1964, as part of the television series, Bob Hope Presents the Chrysler Theatre. Rod Serling wrote the screenplay. It was his third screenplay for the series. Dick Berg was the producer and Ron Winston the director. Benny Carter provided the music.

Rod Steiger starred and was nominated for an Emmy for outstanding performance by an actor in a leading role.
