= Abe Lincoln in Illinois =

Abe Lincoln in Illinois may refer to:

- Abe Lincoln in Illinois (play), 1938, by Robert E. Sherwood
- Abe Lincoln in Illinois (film), a 1940 biographical historical drama film
- Abe Lincoln in Illinois (Hallmark Hall of Fame), an American television play
- Abraham Lincoln's political career in Illinois
