= War of Nerves =

War of Nerves may refer to:

- War of Nerves (song), a 1998 song by All Saints
- War of Nerves (M*A*S*H), an episode of the TV series M*A*S*H
- War of Nerves (Bob Hope Presents the Chrysler Theatre), a 1964 American television film
- War of Nerves (Foyle's War), an episode of the TV series Foyle's War
