= Imperial Venus (film) =

1962 film

- Directed by: Jean Delannoy
- Written by: Rodolphe-Maurice Arlaud; Jean Aurenche; Leonardo Benvenuti; Piero De Bernardi; Jean Delannoy
- Produced by: Robert Chabert; Guido Giambartolomei; Jean Le Duc; Alain Poiré; Angelo Rizzoli; Roger Sallard
- Starring: Gina Lollobrigida; Stephen Boyd; Raymond Pellegrin
- Cinematography: Gábor Pogány
- Edited by: Otello Colangeli
- Music by: Angelo Francesco Lavagnino
- Production companies: Cineriz; Royal Film; Gaumont
- Distributed by: Gaumont Distribution (France); Variety Distribution (Italy)
- Release date: 22 December 1962
- Countries: France; Italy
- Languages: French; Italian
- Budget: $2.5 million

Imperial Venus (French: Vénus impériale, Italian: Venere Imperiale) is a 1962 French-Italian historical drama film directed by Jean Delannoy and starring Gina Lollobrigida, Stephen Boyd and Raymond Pellegrin. It depicts the life of Pauline Bonaparte, the sister of Napoleon. For her performance Lollobrigida won the David di Donatello for best actress and the Nastro d'Argento for the same category. It was shot at the Cinecittà Studios in Rome and on location at the Palazzo Borghese. The film's sets were created by the art director René Renoux, with the costumes designed by Giancarlo Bartolini Salimbeni.

== Synopsis ==
Paolina (Paulette) is the sister of Napoleon Bonaparte, she is portrayed as a willful, yet impulsive woman through her marriages and scandals, through the heights and depths of Napoleon's life.

== Cast ==
- Gina Lollobrigida as Paulette Bonaparte
- Stephen Boyd as Jules de Canouville
- Raymond Pellegrin as Napoleon Bonaparte
- Micheline Presle as Joséphine
- Gabriele Ferzetti as Fréron
- Massimo Girotti as Leclerc
- Marco Guglielmi as Junot
- Lilla Brignone as Letizia Bonaparte
- Ernesto Calindri as Cardinal Fesch
- Andrea Checchi as Doctor
- Giulio Bosetti as Prince Camillo Borghese
- Gianni Santuccio as Antonio Canova
- Maria Laura Rocca as Laura de Barral
- Giustino Durano as Bousqué
- Liana Del Balzo as Princess Borghese
- Andrea Bosic as Del Val
- Claudio Catania as Gerolamo Bonaparte
- Attilio Dottesio

== Bibliography ==
- Nowell-Smith, Geoffrey & Hay, James & Volpi, Gianni. The Companion to Italian Cinema. Cassell, 1996.
