= War of Nerves (Bob Hope Presents the Chrysler Theatre) =

- Bob Hope Presents the Chrysler Theatre episode
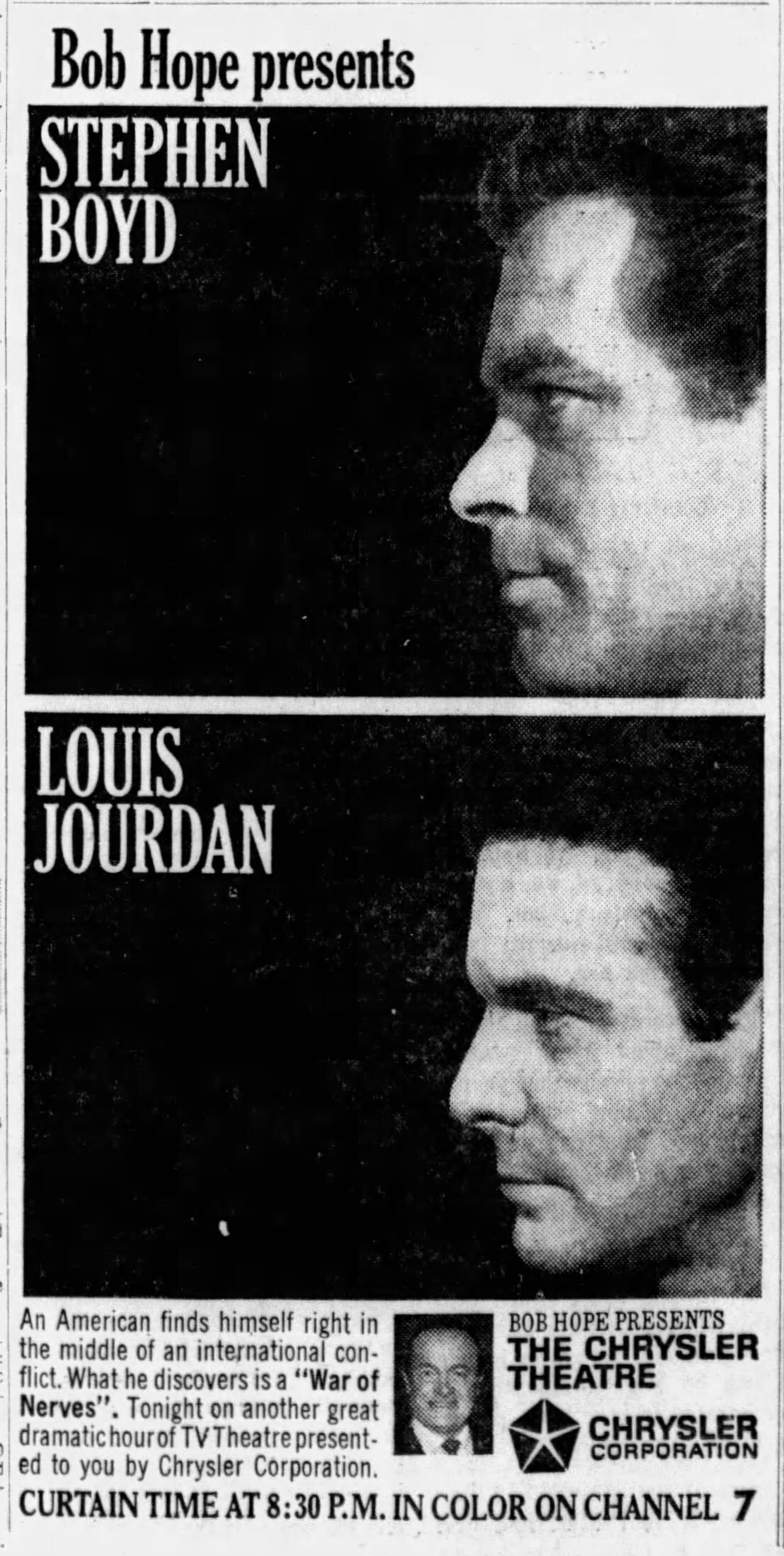
- TV advertisement for "War of Nerves"
- Episode no.: Season 1 Episode 13
- Directed by: Sidney Pollack
- Written by: Mark Rodgers (adaptation), Paul Brickhill (novel)
- Cinematography by: William Margulies
- Original air date: January 3, 1964
- Running time: 1 hour

Guest appearances
- Stephen Boyd as Robert MacKay; Louis Jourdan as Phillipe Tabor; Monique LeMaire as Simone Dumail

Episode chronology
← Previous "Corridor 400"	Next → "Runaway"

"War of Nerves" was an American television film broadcast by NBC on January 3, 1964, as part of the television series, Bob Hope Presents the Chrysler Theatre.

== Plot ==
A young American, Robert MacKay, is in Paris studying architecture. He meets with his American war buddy, Joe Workman, in a cafe. After his friend leaves, MacKay strike up a conversation with a pretty young French girl, Simone Dumail. Simone is part of the Organisation armée secrète, a dissident French paramilitary organization. She alerts her an assassin by phone that Michel Martin has entered the cafe. Martin is a government official who supports independence for Algeria; for this, he has been targeted by the OAS. Simone leaves the cafe and the assassin, Claude, enters moments later, killing Martin. MacKay struggles with Claude as he leaves.

The police arrive, and MacKay is interviewed by Commissioner Paul Favrel. MacKay tells Favrel about the French girl who was on the phone before the assassin entered. MacKay agrees to examine photos the police station to see if he can identify the assassin. The police have also gathered female Sorbonne students who are OAS sympathizers. Martin is asked if he can identify the girl from the cafe. Simone is in the lineup, but MacKay does not identify her. Favrel warns MacKay that the OAS will try to kill him.

MacKay tracks down Simone at her school. He asks her to meet him at a cafe after her class. Simone enters her Shakespeare class which is taught by Phillipe Tabor. Simone later meets MacKay at the cafe. She insists that she didn't know that anyone was going to be shot and warns him that it is very dangerous to identify a man from the OAS. They agree to meet again later.

Simone finds Tabor in her apartment. She confronts him about changing the plan. She did not know that Martin was to be killed. Tabor learns that Simone met with MacKay, as he had her followed. Simone and Tabor are lovers. She asks Tabor not to harm MacKay.

Favrel has had MacKay followed and confronts him about meeting again with Simone. Favrel takes MacKay to a hospital to meet his wife, Marie, who was blinded in an OAS bombing.

MacKay meets Simone again. MacKay returns to his apartment to find that it has been bombed by the OAS. MacKay's friend Workman was killed in the explosion. Favrel explains that the bomb was planted while MacKay was with Simone and that the bomb was intended for him.

Simone learns of the OAS bombing at MacKay's apartment and believes he is dead. She then discovers him alive at the cafe where they met. She denies having anything to do with the bombing. As they leave the cafe, Claude approaches with a gun. The police have been following MacKay and shoot Claude.

MacKay returns with Simone to her apartment. Tabor calls on the payphone from across the street. He asks Simone to meet him at Orly Airport with his passbook. Simone calls Favrel to tell him where they can find Tabor. As MacKay and Simone leave her apartment, Tabor steps from the darkness intending to kill MacKay. Simone shoots Tabor before he can shoot. Simone apologizes to Tabor and then walks off into the night.

== Cast ==
The cast included performances by:

- Stephen Boyd as Robert MacKay
- Louis Jourdan as Phillipe Tabor
- Monique LeMaire as Simone Dumail
- Émile Genest as Paul Favrel
- Maurice Marsac as Broussard
- Bernie Hamilton as Joe Workman
- Jacques Roux as Bartender
- Willie Soo Hoo as Oriental Student
- Janine Grandel as Marie Favrel
- Albert Carrier as The Man

== Production ==
The film was a Hovue production. It was broadcast by NBC on January 3, 1964, as part of the television series, Bob Hope Presents the Chrysler Theatre. Dick Berg was the producer and Sidney Pollack the director. The screenplay was Mark Rodgers based on the novel by Paul Brickhill. John Williams, credited as Johnny Williams, composed the music, and John J. Lloyd was the art director.
