= Casanova 70 =

1965 Italian sex comedy film by Mario Monicelli

- film poster
- Directed by: Mario Monicelli
- Written by: Mario Monicelli; Suso Cecchi d'Amico; Tonino Guerra
- Produced by: Carlo Ponti
- Starring: Marcello Mastroianni; Virna Lisi; Enrico Maria Salerno; Marisa Mell; Michèle Mercier
- Cinematography: Aldo Tonti
- Distributed by: Euro International Films
- Release date: 1965
- Running time: 113 minutes
- Country: Italy
- Language: Italian
- Box office: $3,100,000

Casanova 70 is a 1965 Italian sex comedy directed and co-writren by Mario Monicelli and produced by Carlo Ponti. Starred by Marcello Mastroianni, Virna Lisi, Enrico Maria Salerno and Michèle Mercier.

== Plot ==
NATO officer Andrea Rossi-Colombotti is a ladies' man with an unusual libido: he can only seduce women in situations in which his life is in danger. He breaks into a Corsican girlfriend's house, and the girl, armed and voluptuous, believes Andrea to be a criminal and nearly shoots him before being seduced, but she later ends their relationship. Later, while spending an afternoon with an Asian air stewardess, Andrea tries to achieve arousal by concocting a story about a dying relative, but the stewardess learns the sham and the liaison ends disastrously.

Frustrated with his condition, Andrea visits a psychiatrist. He discloses that his problem began in adulthood, but that he has flirted with woman and suffered from the consequences throughout his life. The psychiatrist recommends that Andrea try to seek spiritual qualities in women rather than focusing on their physical attributes, and to attempt to connect with them emotionally.

Andrea visits a ski resort, where he meets a beautiful Gigliola, who travels with her parents and her uncle, a Catholic priest. Following the doctor's advice, he does not seduce her but instead charms her and takes her out on romantic dates. Attracted by the girl's sweetness, Andrea proposes marriage. The night before the wedding, Andrea takes his girlfriend with family to a circus, where a beautiful female lion tamer challenges anyone to kiss her amidst a group of lions. Andrea cannot refuse such an offer and passionately kisses the lion tamer, bringing an end to his romance with Gigliola.

Andrea next becomes involved with an American woman, the wife of a major who happens to be his superior. The passionate but potentially dangerous affair ends quickly, and Andrea is posted to Sicily, where he encounters a Sicilian girl from a fierce-tempered honorable family. The girl's family accuses her of impurity, and Andrea poses as a doctor in order to check on her but takes advantage of the dangerous opportunity to seduce her. The family catches him in the act and chases after him, but, with much difficulty, he escapes.

Andrea now takes the only alternative he knows: he returns to his Italian hometown and to Gigliola, his first sweetheart, who still resides there. Gigliola left him after the scandal in the circus, but she still loves him, and he hopes that her love will aid him in overcoming his problem. When she hears about Andrea's condition and his attempts to cure it, she pledges to give herself to him if doing so will cause him to cease seducing other women. However, Andrea cannot bear to seduce a woman whom he truly loves and instead spends the night with a woman who is reputed to bring ill fortune to her men.

Andrea's next lover is a countess whose much older husband is believed to be deaf. She lures Andrea into a plot to murder her husband: they will seat him under a heavy and delicately balanced stone ball atop a wall, and at the slightest shock, the ball will fall on top of him. Aroused by such a dangerous venture, Andrea consents but does not actually intend to bring the plan to fruition. However, the count is not really deaf, and having heard the plan, he tries to turn it upon Andrea: he adjusts the ball to become even more unsteady, and convinces Andrea to take his seat. But the seat breaks under Andrea's weight and while the count sets up a new one, Andrea accidentally slams a door and causes the ball to fall on the count, killing him.

Andrea is put on trial for his supposed crime, which attracts wide publicity and interest. Many of his former lovers appear in court to speak about him, but only Gigliola believes in his innocence and attempts to defend him. The psychiatrist whom Andrea had consulted is called upon, but while testifying, he breaks down. All Andrea can offer the court is a heartfelt apology for his condition and the trouble that it has caused. At the last moment, news arrives that wins Andrea's acquittal: an autopsy has revealed that the count had sound hearing and should have been able to prevent his demise, and as such the death is considered an accident.

Andrea and Gigliola are later shown to be happily married and residing in a high-rise apartment in Milan, though Andrea has not been cured of his condition.

== Cast ==
- Marcello Mastroianni – Major Andrea Rossi-Colombotti
- Virna Lisi – Gigliola
- Marisa Mell – Thelma
- Michèle Mercier – Noelle
- Enrico Maria Salerno – Professore (psychiatrist)
- Liana Orfei – Lion Tamer
- Guido Alberti – Monsignore
- Beba Lončar – La ragazza del museo
- Moira Orfei – Santina
- Margaret Lee– Lolly
- Rosemary Dexter – Maid
- Jolanda Modio – Addolorata
- Seyna Seyn – Indonesian Airline Hostess
- Luciana Paoli – La moglie del droghiere
- Marco Ferreri – Count
- Bernard Blier – Il commissario (uncredited)

== Awards ==
- Nominated for the Academy Award for Best Original Screenplay
- Won two awards at San Sebastián Film Festival: Best Director (Monicelli) and Best Actor (Mastroianni).
