= The Great Swindle (1971 film) =

- Spanish film poster
- Directed by: J. A. Nieves Conde
- Written by: Giorgio Simonelli; J. J. Alonso Millan; J. M. Lamet
- Produced by: Luis Mendez
- Starring: Stephen Boyd; Marisa Mell; Silva Koscina; Fernando Rey
- Cinematography: Antonio L. Ballesteros
- Edited by: Pablo del Amo
- Music by: Carlo Savina
- Distributed by: World International Films Inc.
- Release dates: 6 March 1971 (Spain); 19 April 1971 (Italy)
- Running time: 93 minutes
- Countries: Spain; Italy
- Language: Spanish

The Great Swindle is a 1971 Spanish-Italian thriller directed by José Antonio Nieves Conde. The film follows Carla, a woman who uses seduction and deception as she and others assume false identities, engaging in a web of deadly schemes. Its Spanish title is Historia de una traición, and it is also known in Italy as Nel buio del terrore and Diabolicamente sole con il delitto.

== Plot ==
After serving their time at the reformatory, Lola and Carla go their separate ways. Lola is shy and reserved, while Carla is bold and focused solely on making money from men. When Carla runs into Lola at a mountain hotel where Lola works as a waitress, she persuades her to move in and live together.

== Cast ==
- Marisa Mell as Carla
- Stephen Boyd as Arturo
- Fernando Rey as Luis
- Sylva Koscina as Lola
- Massimo Serato as Hugo
- Howard Ross as Joven
- Simon Andreu as The Pilot
- Maria Martin as Regina
