= Venusberg (film) =

1963 film

- Directed by: Rolf Thiele
- Written by: Rolf Thiele
- Produced by: Franz Seitz
- Starring: Marisa Mell; Nicole Badal; Monica Ekman
- Cinematography: Wolf Wirth
- Edited by: Ingeborg Taschner
- Music by: Rolf A. Wilhelm
- Production company: Franz Seitz Filmproduktion
- Distributed by: Nora-Filmverleih
- Release date: 26 April 1963
- Running time: 88 minutes
- Country: West Germany
- Language: German

Venusberg is a 1963 West German comedy drama film directed by Rolf Thiele and starring Marisa Mell, Nicole Badal, and Monica Ekman.

== Cast ==
- Marisa Mell as Florentine
- Nicole Badal as Pony
- Monica Ekman as Christine
- Christina Granberg as Lola
- Ina Duscha as Inge
- Claudia Marus as Vera
- Jane Axell as Ruth
- Oskar Werner (voice)

== Bibliography ==
- Bock, Hans-Michael; Bergfelder, Tim, eds. (2009). The Concise Cinegraph: Encyclopaedia of German Cinema. New York: Berghahn Books. ISBN 978-1-57181-655-9.
