= Mata Hari (1967 musical) =

Musical by Jerome Coopersmith, Martin Charnin, and Edward Thomas

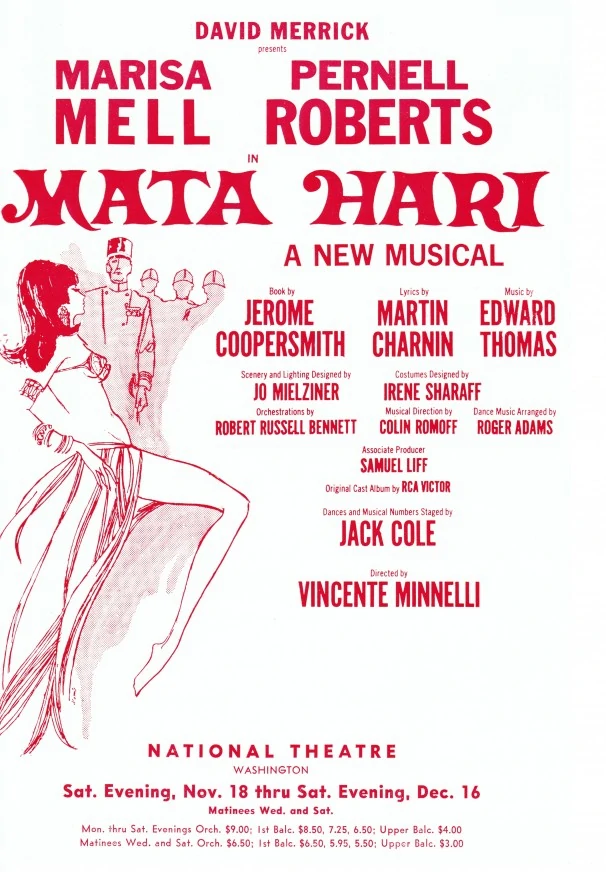
- Original production poster
- Music: Edward Thomas
- Lyrics: Martin Charnin
- Book: Jerome Coopersmith
- Basis: Last years of Mata Hari
- Productions: 1967

Mata Hari is a musical with a book by Jerome Coopersmith, lyrics by Martin Charnin and music by Edward Thomas. The exotic dancer Mata Hari was accused of spying for the Germans during World War I and was executed by a French firing squad, but her guilt is still being debated. The musical is centered on her fictional affair with a French intelligence officer who plays a major role in her arrest and execution and later regrets it. A parallel sequence of events follows a young French soldier who fights in the trenches, illustrating what war is really about. The musical was perceived as an anti-war piece at a time when the US war in Vietnam was sinking in popularity.

The show's original production by David Merrick received a pre-Broadway tryout in December 1967 at National Theatre in Washington, DC, starring Austrian actress Marisa Mell in the title role opposite Pernell Roberts, who left Bonanza to star in the show; the crew included director Vincente Minnelli, set designer Jo Mielziner, costume designer Irene Sharaff, and choreographer Jack Cole. The show received scathing reviews and Merrick cancelled the Broadway production, taking a $500,000 loss. In December 1968, the authors brought a more modest version of it to New York's off-Broadway Theatre de Lys (now the Lucille Lortel Theater) under the title Ballad for a Firing Squad. It lasted there for fifteen performances.

In 1996, York Theatre in New York revived the 1968 version under the original title Mata Hari. A cast recording of that production was released in 2001.

== Synopsis ==
In 1917, Captain Henry LaFarge, a French military intelligence officer, believes that the exotic dancer, Mata Hari, is the most dangerous German spy in France; he is obsessed with bringing her to justice. While surveilling her, he falls in love and they have an affair. Still in doubt about her loyalty to France, he sets a trap for her, and she fails the test. She is tried and sentenced to death. LaFarge discovers that she may have been framed by his superiors, who wish to blame their military losses upon her supposed espionage. LaFarge tries to prevent the execution but fails. He falls into despair even as he is hailed as a hero for capturing the spy. The story is interwoven with scenes portraying a young soldier who evolves from a naïve and idealistic youth into a war-hardened, but disillusioned, killer. He sings the anti-war song "Maman", describing a letter to his mother from the trenches. The two story lines intersect when he becomes a member of Mata Hari's execution squad.

== Musical numbers ==
Act I

- "This is Not a Very Nice War" - The Young Soldier
- "Is This Fact?" - LaFarge, Devires, Boulet & Office
- "Mata Hari's Dance at the Salon" - Mata Hari and Dancing Girls
- "Everyone Has Something to Hide" - Mata Hari and Ensemble
- "Waltz at the Salon" - Ensemble
- "How Young You Were Tonight" - LaFarge and Paulette
- "Curiosity" - Mata Hari, LaFarge, Boulet, Officers and Dancing Girls
- "I'm Saving Myself for a Soldier - Vaudevillians and Ensemble
- "I'm Saving Myself for a Soldier (Reprise) - Vaudevillians and Ensemble
- "Maman" - The Young Soldier
- "The Choice is Yours" - Mata Hari and LaFarge
- "Sextet" - Paulette, LaFarge, Claudine, Mr. Dupre, Mrs. Dupre, Philipe, Michele, Maurice, and Pierre
- "I Don't See Him Very Much Anymore" - Paulette
- "No More Than a Moment" - Mata Hari and LaFarge
- "In Madrid" - Ensemble
- "Dance at the Cafe del Torro" - Mata Hari and Dancers

Act II

- "Hello, Yank!" - The Young Soldier, French and American Soldiers
- "You Have No Idea" - Mata Hari, LaFarge, Boulet, and Officers
- "Sextet (Reprise)" - Paulette, Relatives and People on the Street
- "There Is No You" - LaFarge
- "There Will Be Love Again" - Mata Hari
- "There Is No You (Reprise) - LaFarge

== Reception ==
In The Season: A Candid Look at Broadway, William Goldman called Mata Hari "the one genuinely ambitious musical of the year" but criticized Minnelli's work as director, saying, "His work was so helpless, so inept, that he had the bulk of the action taking place upstage at a distance far removed from the audience, making the show, in a musical-comedy sense, all but invisible. Most musicals need to be brightly lit and played as close to the footlights as possible so that the audience can see and hear them."
