= Stephen Boyd =

Northern Irish actor (1931–1977)

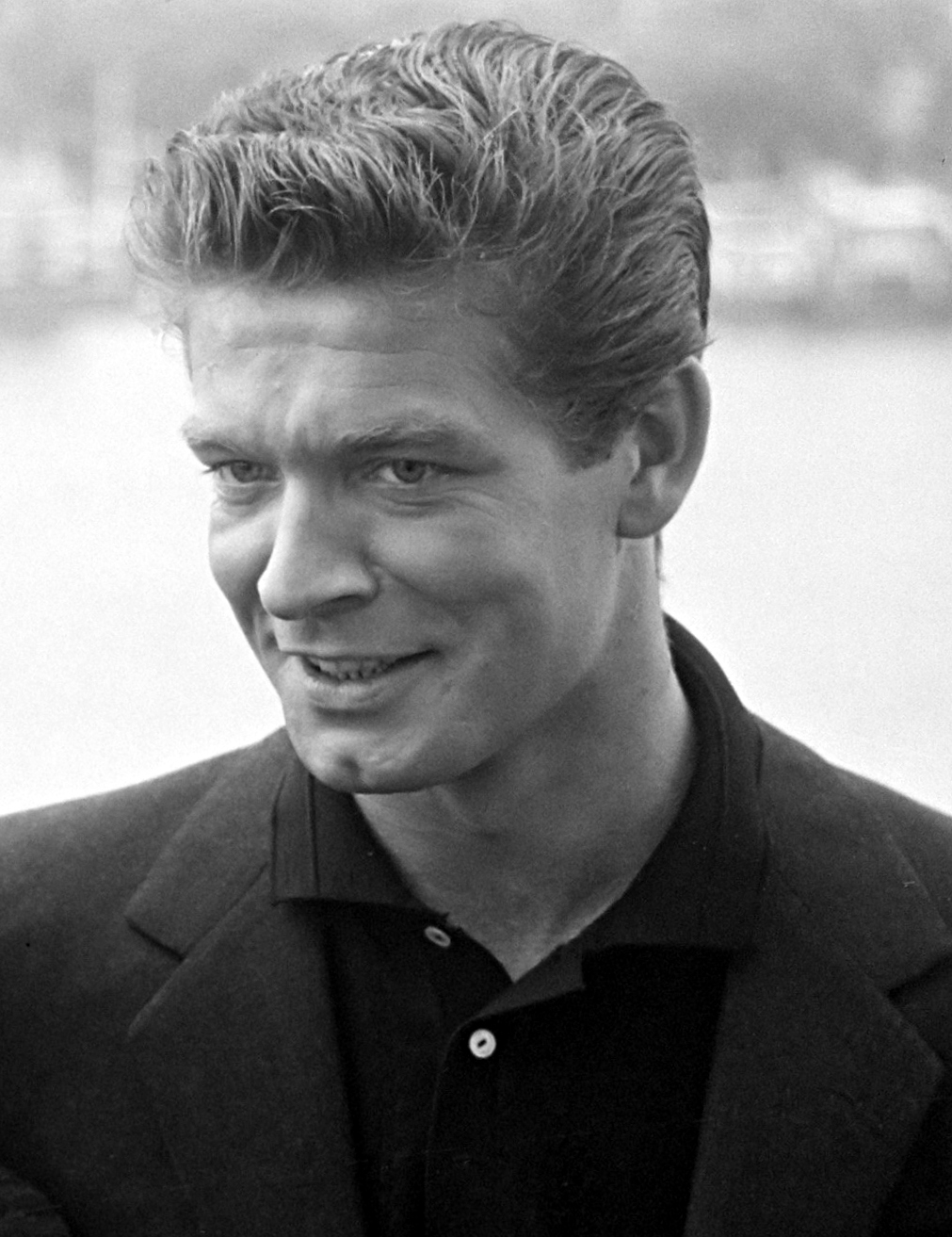
- Boyd in 1961
- Born: William Millar; 4 July 1931; Whitehouse, County Antrim, Northern Ireland
- Died: 2 June 1977 (aged 45); Northridge, Los Angeles, California, US
- Resting place: Oakwood Memorial Park Cemetery
- Occupation: Actor
- Years active: 1955–1977
- Spouses: Mariella di Sarzana (m. 1958; div. 1959) Elizabeth Mills (m. 1974)
- Partner: Marisa Mell (1970–1972)

William Millar (4 July 1931 – 2 June 1977), better known by his stage name Stephen Boyd, was an actor from Northern Ireland. He emerged as a leading man during the late 1950s with his role as the villainous Messala in Ben-Hur (1959), a role that earned him the Golden Globe Award for Best Supporting Actor – Motion Picture. He received his second Golden Globe nomination for the musical Billy Rose's Jumbo (1962).

Boyd also appeared, sometimes as a hero and sometimes as a malefactor, in the major big-screen productions The Man Who Never Was (1956), The Night Heaven Fell (1958), The Bravados (1958), The Fall of the Roman Empire (1964), Genghis Khan (1965), Fantastic Voyage (1966), The Bible: In the Beginning... (also 1966), and Shalako (1968).

== Biography ==
=== Early life ===
Stephen Boyd was born on 4 July 1931 in Whitehouse in Newtownabbey, County Antrim. He was the youngest of nine children born to Scots-Irish Canadian parents, James Alexander Millar and his wife Martha Boyd. At a very early age, William, or Billy as he was known, moved with the family to live in Glengormley. Boyd was raised Presbyterian and attended the local primary school and Ballyclare High School.

At the age of 14, Boyd quit school to work and earn money to help support his family. He eventually joined the Ulster Group Theatre, where he learned the behind-the-scenes tasks of the theatre. He became well known in Belfast for his contributions as a gravel-voiced policeman on The McCooeys, the story of a Belfast family written by Joseph Tomelty that was broadcast on the Northern Irish section of the BBC Home Service.

Boyd eventually worked his way up to character parts and then starring roles. By nineteen he had toured Canada with summer stock companies. In 1950, he made a coast-to-coast tour of America with the Clare Tree Major Company, performing A Streetcar Named Desire in the lead role as Stanley Kowalski. Boyd later recalled this as "the best performance I ever gave in my life".

By the time he was 20, Boyd had a wide range of theatre experience, but he longed for the big stage. In 1952, he moved to London and worked in a cafeteria and busked outside a cinema in Leicester Square to get money as he was literally close to starvation. Boyd caught his first break as a doorman at the Odeon Theatre.

The Leicester Square Cinema across the street recruited him to usher attendees during the British Academy Awards in the early 1950s. During the awards ceremony, he was noticed by actor Sir Michael Redgrave, who used his connections to introduce Boyd to the director of the Windsor Repertory Group. At this point, Boyd's stage career in the UK began to flourish with performances in "The Deep Blue Sea" and "Barnett's Folly".

=== Early roles ===
Boyd's first role that brought him acclaim was as a pro-Nazi Irish spy in the movie The Man Who Never Was, based on the book by Ewen Montagu. The movie was released in April 1956.

Shortly thereafter, he signed a ten-year contract with 20th Century Fox studios, which began prepping him for Hollywood, but it was a while until Boyd actually set foot on a Hollywood back-lot. Boyd's next stop was Portugal, where he acted in A Hill in Korea, which also featured future stars Michael Caine and Robert Shaw. In June 1956, Boyd was cast in the shipwreck drama Abandon Ship! for Columbia Studios starring Tyrone Power. This was filmed in the summer of 1956 in London, where the British Navy built a huge 35,000-gallon water tank for the movie.

In November 1956, for Twentieth Century Fox, Boyd travelled to the British West Indies as part of a large ensemble cast in Darryl Zanuck's racially provocative film Island in the Sun starring Dorothy Dandridge, based on the Alec Waugh novel. Boyd portrayed a young English aristocrat who becomes the lover of Joan Collins. Boyd was loaned out to the J. Arthur Rank production of Seven Thunders (Beast of Marseilles), a World War II romance set in Nazi-occupied Marseille. This movie was filmed on location in Marseille and at Pinewood Studios in London in the spring of 1957 and featured Boyd in his most prominent starring film role yet.

Around the same time, French actress Brigitte Bardot was given the opportunity to cast her own leading man in her next movie after her success in Roger Vadim's And God Created Woman, and she chose Boyd. From August to October 1957, Bardot, Boyd, and Alida Valli filmed the lusty romance The Night Heaven Fell, directed by Roger Vadim in Paris and in the region of Málaga, Spain, specifically the small, whitewashed town of Mijas. Being in the Bardot spotlight added much to Boyd's film credit, in addition to bringing him notice in Hollywood.

Boyd finally arrived in Hollywood in January 1958 to take on his first true Hollywood role as the leader of a quartet of renegade outlaws in the Twentieth Century Fox western The Bravados, which starred Gregory Peck and Joan Collins. Even though this was a Hollywood production, the actual filming took place in Morelia, Mexico.

=== Ben-Hur ===
After the filming of The Bravados was complete in late March 1958, Boyd returned to Hollywood to audition for the role of Messala in MGM's upcoming epic Ben-Hur. Many other actors, including Victor Mature, Kirk Douglas, Leslie Nielsen and Stewart Granger had been considered for the part, but Boyd's screen test convinced director William Wyler that he had found the perfect villain for his epic. Wyler had also admired Boyd's performance in The Man Who Never Was the previous year. Boyd was hurried off to join lead actor Charlton Heston in Rome in May 1958 to learn the chariot racing aspect of his role. Heston had already been practising behind the chariot for weeks, so Boyd needed to learn quickly. Boyd was also required to wear brown contact lenses as Messala, which irritated his eyes and caused vision problems for a few months after the movie was completed. Boyd described the filming experience of Ben-Hur as the most exciting experience of his life.

Years after the movie was released, interim Ben-Hur screenwriter and novelist Gore Vidal revealed that Boyd had portrayed his character Messala in Ben-Hur with an underlying homosexual energy, as instructed to by Vidal when he greets Judah Ben-Hur (Charlton Heston) in the opening sequence. In Vidal's autobiography Palimpsest: A Memoir he described his discussion first with Wyler concerning Messala's underlying motivation, namely that Messala and Judah Ben-Hur had previously been lovers. This was based on an idea by Vidal to enhance the tension between the two main antagonists. Wyler specifically told Vidal, "You talk to Boyd. But don't you say a word to Chuck or he'll fall apart." In Palimpsest, Vidal said, "Over the next few years, whenever we met [William Wyler], we quarreled amiably over what I had put in the scene and what Steven Boyd is clearly playing." Vidal later came into conflict with Heston about his version of the Messala/Ben-Hur relationship and the implications surrounding Ben-Hur.

After the filming of Ben-Hur was completed Boyd returned to Hollywood in early 1959 to star with Susan Hayward in the Canadian-based drama Woman Obsessed. Some advertisements for this movie labelled Boyd as "The Young New Clark Gable". He was then part of another ensemble cast in the adaptation of Rona Jaffe's novel The Best of Everything, filmed in May and June 1959 at Fox Studios in Hollywood and on location in New York City.

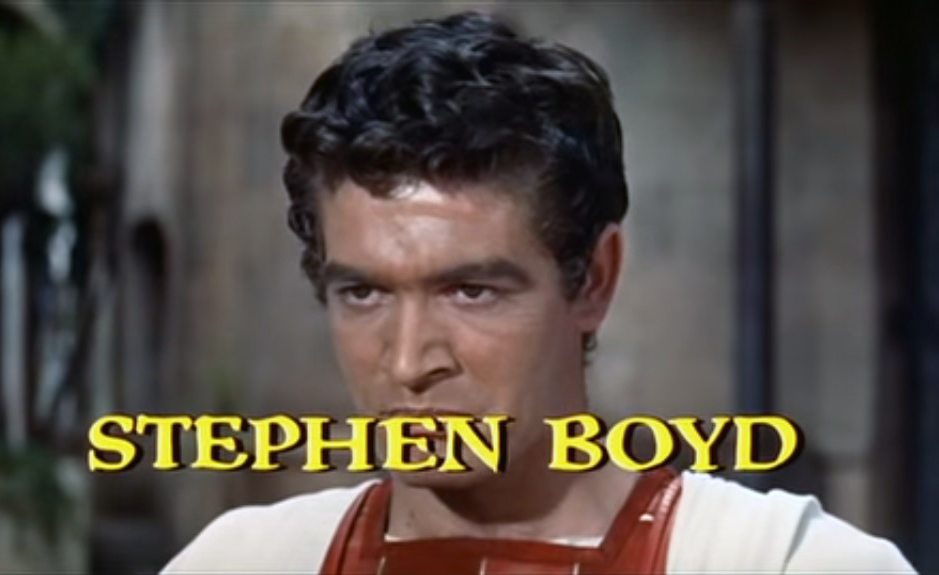
From the trailer for the film Ben-Hur (1959)

Ben-Hur was released in November 1959. His portrayal of Messala was praised by critics. Press columnist Erskine Johnson wrote, "A brass hat and the armor of a Roman warrior in Ben-Hur does for Stephen Boyd what a tight dress does for Marilyn Monroe." Ruth Waterbury, in her Boyd feature in the Pittsburgh Post-Gazette, described Boyd's character as "the dangerously masculine and quite magnificent Messala." Modern Screen magazine in 1960 stated that Boyd's ruthless Messala had "lost the chariot race but captured the sympathy and sex appeal of Ben-Hur."

=== 1960s ===
Boyd was featured in the TV programme This Is Your Life on 3 February 1960, which featured many of Boyd's family members and acquaintances (including Michael Redgrave) telling stories about his early life and film career. He was being sent dozens of starring roles, most of which he had to turn down due to other obligations. He opted out of the biblical epic The Story of Ruth, which didn't please Fox studios, and he was one of the front-runners to star with Marilyn Monroe in her picture Let's Make Love.

In early 1960, Boyd won the Golden Globe Award for Best Supporting Actor – Motion Picture for his performance in Ben-Hur. In January 1960, Boyd made a guest appearance alongside the silent-era Ben-Hur stars Ramon Novarro and Francis X. Bushman on Hedda Hopper's television programme Hedda Hopper's Hollywood. In February 1960, he starred in the Playhouse 90 television performance called The Sound of Trumpets with Dolores Hart, which garnered good reviews. He also appeared as a singing guest on The Dinah Shore Chevy Show on 13 March 1960 where he performed two Irish folk songs with Shore, "The Leprechaun Song" and "Molly Malone", and an Irish step dance.

Boyd's next choice was The Big Gamble, which featured Juliette Gréco. It was filmed on the Ivory Coast of West Africa, Dublin, and southern France in the spring and summer of 1961. The crew slept in tents in the jungle that were guarded by natives on parole for cannibalism.

Boyd was originally chosen to play Mark Antony opposite Elizabeth Taylor in 20th Century Fox's production of Cleopatra (1963) under the direction of Rouben Mamoulian. He began film work in September 1960 but eventually withdrew after Elizabeth Taylor's severe illness postponed the film for months.

After several months without active work, Boyd got his first post-Cleopatra role. The film was The Inspector, re-titled Lisa for the American release. It was based on the novel by Jan de Hartog and co-starred actress Dolores Hart. The film was made in Amsterdam, London and Wales during the summer of 1961. On 9 January 1962, Boyd was featured in a television film from General Electric Theater called The Wall Between, co-starring Ronald Reagan and Gloria Talbott.

Boyd flew to Rome in the summer of 1962 to act with Gina Lollobrigida in Imperial Venus, a romantic epic about the many loves of Pauline Bonaparte, the sister of Napoleon. This film was the first film to be banned by the Motion Picture Association of America for male nudity. Boyd appeared in a humorous bedroom scene, naked with only his lower half covered by a bed-sheet. The suggestion of nudity was too much for the censors and the movie was never released in the United States. Boyd returned to the States briefly after finishing Imperial Venus, where he appeared for the second time on The Dinah Shore Chevy Show, which aired on 11 November 1962. For this program Boyd was a last-minute replacement for actor James Garner and joined Shore and entertainer Dean Martin for a few musical numbers.

Boyd arrived in Spain in early 1963 to begin work on Samuel Bronston's production of The Fall of the Roman Empire, directed by Anthony Mann. This was filmed during a severely cold winter in Europe and the production in the Sierra de Guadarrama of Spain encountered several challenges with the snow. Boyd's co-star was another Italian legend, Sophia Loren. Boyd also had the opportunity to ride another chariot in this film. Although the movie did well internationally when it was released in April 1964, it was a box office failure in the United States and signalled the end of Roman epics in the 1960s. More appreciated with the passing of time, The Fall of the Roman Empire was also recognised by critics as being a major inspiration for Ridley Scott's Academy Award-winning movie Gladiator.

Boyd flew back to Hollywood in the summer to star in a Bob Hope Presents the Chrysler Theatre episode with Louis Jourdan called War of Nerves, which aired on 3 January 1964. He then returned to Europe to film the suspenseful The Third Secret starring Pamela Franklin, Richard Attenborough, Jack Hawkins and Diane Cilento.

On 23 December 1963, Boyd became a naturalised US citizen during a ceremony at the Federal Building in Los Angeles, California.

Boyd was originally cast as the lead in Anthony Mann's World War II drama The Unknown Battle, which was set to film in early 1964 with co-stars Elke Sommer and Anthony Perkins in Norway. After several weeks of waiting, studio funding for the project fell through. Boyd sued Mann for $500,000 for a breach of contract, missed time and other lost film opportunities. The project was completed by Mann a year later and released as Heroes of Telemark with Kirk Douglas replacing Boyd as the lead.

In 1964, Boyd continued to make films in Europe, travelling to Yugoslavia to star as the villain Jamuga in the epic Genghis Khan. Boyd was the top billed and therefore the top paid star in the epic, and this apparently caused friction with up-and-coming star Omar Sharif. After completing Genghis Khan, Boyd trekked to Cairo, Egypt for a brief appearance as the regal King Nimrod at The Tower of Babel in Dino de Laurentiis's production of The Bible: In the Beginning..., directed by John Huston.

Boyd returned to the United States to start work on the Twentieth Century Fox science fiction adventure Fantastic Voyage. This was filmed in the early part of 1965. In the summer of 1965, Boyd joined German star Elke Sommer and music legend Tony Bennett to film the Hollywood drama The Oscar, based on the eponymous Richard Sale novel. The movie was a popular success, but maligned by film critics. Boyd made a 10-day visit to Iran in December 1965 to film his scenes for the United Nations film project Terence Young's The Poppy Is Also a Flower, written by James Bond creator Ian Fleming.

In 1966, Joseph Levine hired Boyd for his film project, The Caper of the Golden Bulls, based on a William McGivern novel. This movie was partly filmed on location in Spain in the summer of 1966.

Boyd starred in the spy thriller Assignment K with Camilla Sparv, which was filmed in Germany, Austria and London during February and March 1967. Boyd grew a full beard for his next role as the iconic Irish playwright and critic George Bernard Shaw in the Off-Broadway play called The Bashful Genius written by Harold Callen. This was Boyd's first return to the stage since the mid-1950s, and the experience for Boyd was immensely rewarding on a personal level. He received excellent reviews for his nuanced performance of the multi-faceted Shaw. The play had a very brief run during the summer of 1967 in Denver, Philadelphia and Falmouth, Massachusetts.

In early 1968, Boyd was cast as the villain opposite Sean Connery and Brigitte Bardot in the western adventure Shalako, based on the Louis L'Amour novel. Shalako was filmed in the early part of 1968 in Almería, Spain. After returning to the United States, Boyd took the role of the cruel slave master Nathan MacKay in the Southern drama Slaves, also starring Ossie Davis and singer Dionne Warwick. The film was loosely based on the Harriet Beecher Stowe novel Uncle Tom's Cabin. It was filmed during the summer of 1968 near Shreveport, Louisiana. The film was released during the volatile civil rights era and in May 1969 Boyd attended the premiere alongside Dionne Warwick in Baltimore

It was around this time that Boyd began his interest in L. Ron Hubbard's Church of Scientology, which made him one of the first Hollywood stars to be involved in it. Boyd had always expressed an interest in esoteric religions. In an interview in August 1969 with the Detroit Free Press, Boyd explained that Scientology had helped him through the filming of Slaves, and that to him Scientology was "a process used to make you capable of learning. Scientology is nothing. It means only what you want it to. It is not a church you go to pray, but a church that you go to learn. It is no good unless you apply it. It is the application." Boyd apparently had been elevated to a Scientology Status of OT 6, a position above that of Clear. Boyd starred in and narrated a Scientology recruiting movie titled Freedom in 1970. Dolores Hart wrote her friendship with Boyd was hurt by his scientology.

=== 1970s ===
During the 1970s, the demand for Boyd in Hollywood diminished, so he focused his attention on European films and several television pilots and shows. He made three films in Spain with director José Antonio Nieves Conde, including Marta in 1970, The Great Swindle in 1971, and Casa Manchada in 1975. He worked with cult director Romain Gary in the drug thriller Kill! in 1971. He also made several Westerns, including Hannie Caulder with Raquel Welch in 1971, The Man Called Noon in 1973, Those Dirty Dogs in 1973, and Montana Trap in 1976. Boyd continued to travel to a wide variety of locations to work, including Australia for The Hands of Cormac Joyce in 1972, South Africa for Control Factor and The Manipulator in 1972–1973, Jamaica for the scuba diving adventure The Treasure of Jamaica Reef in 1972, Florida for the television pilot Key West in 1973, and Hawaii in his last acting stint as a guest star on the popular television show Hawaii Five-O in 1977. The episode Up the Rebels was the premiere episode of Hawaii Five-O's tenth season, and it aired after Boyd's death on 15 September 1977. His most critically acclaimed role during the 1970s was as a colourful Irish gangster in the UK crime thriller The Squeeze in 1977.

A letter from film producer Euan Lloyd (who produced such films as Shalako, The Man Called Noon and The Wild Geese), states that "Stephen Boyd was one of the nicest, kindest people I have met in my lifetime, rare in this profession."

Although Boyd spent most of his adult life travelling abroad for film work, he made his permanent home in southern California. At one point in the 1960s, he had three homes there — one above the Sunset Strip, one in Tarzana and another in Palm Springs, where he enjoyed his favorite pastime, golf.

== Personal life ==
Boyd was first married in 1958 to Italian-born MCA executive Mariella Di Sarzana during the filming of Ben-Hur. They separated after just three weeks. Concerning his short-lived marriage to Sarzana, Boyd explained: "It was my fault. I'm an Irish so-and-so when I'm working. I hadn't been married a week when we both knew we had made a mistake. She is a nice girl but we were just not meant for each other. I suppose I wasn't ready for marriage. Maybe I was still too much of an adolescent." They officially divorced in early 1959.

He had a friendship with Brigitte Bardot with whom he starred in two films. It even caused Brigitte's husband at the time, Gunter Sachs, to ask for a divorce.

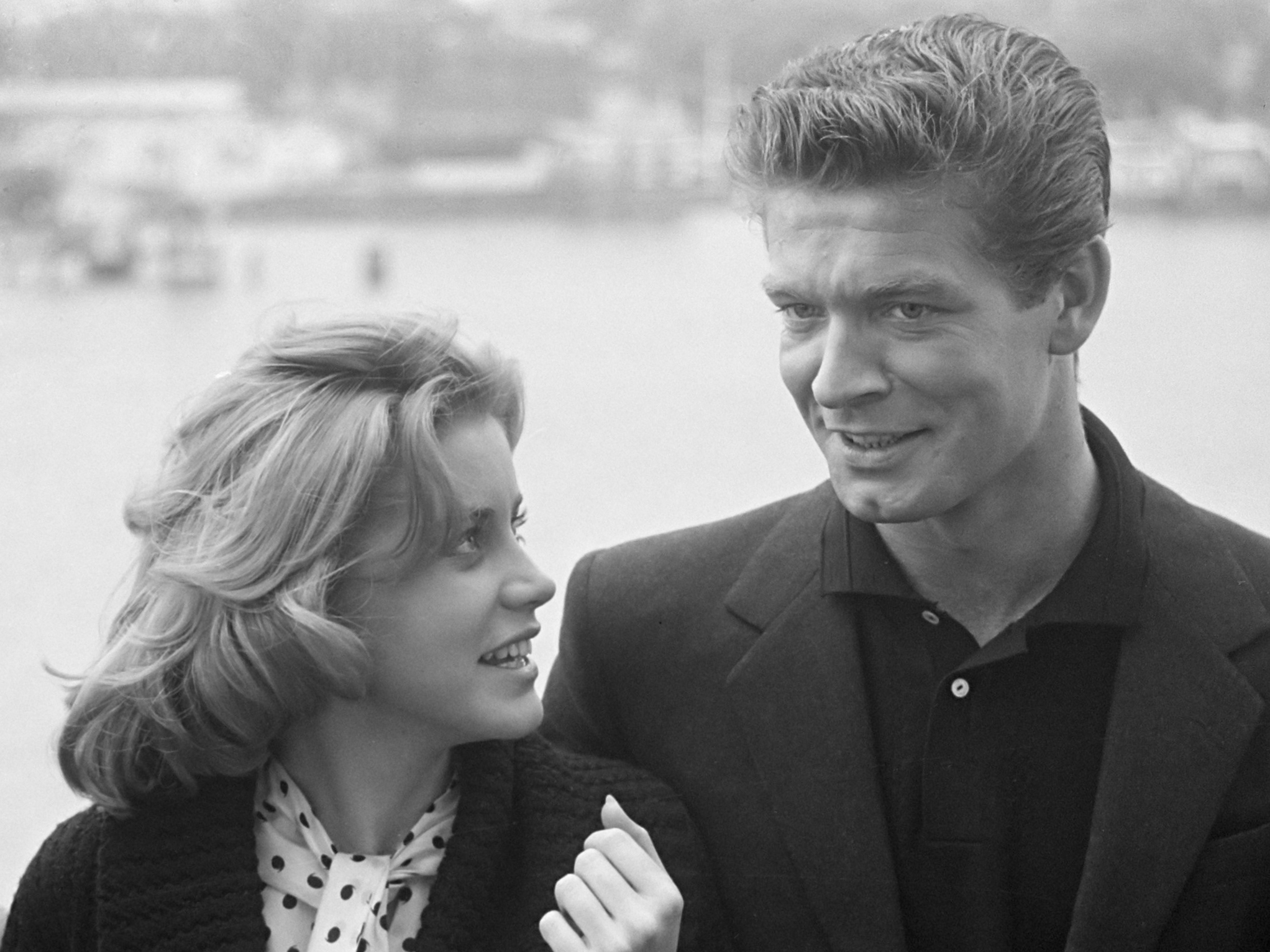
Hart and Boyd in 1961

Boyd also had a close relationship with actress Dolores Hart who describes what was her only romance with a co-star in her autobiography The Ear of the Heart. Boyd eventually rejected her advances, but they remained close friends even after she turned to the cloistered life of a nun in 1963. He visited her in 1966 at the Abbey of Regina Laudis in Connecticut and remained in communication with her until the early 1970s.

Boyd had an affair that seems to have been with Marisa Mell. They met while filming the movie Marta in 1970. During the second film they made together, The Great Swindle, the two became lovers. In early 1972, after Boyd broke off the affair, Mell said: "We both believe in reincarnation, and we realized we've already been lovers in three different lifetimes, and in each one I made him suffer terribly." Mell remembered Boyd many years later in her autobiography Cover Love from 1990, dedicating a chapter to their affair.

Boyd's last marriage took place in 1974 to Elizabeth Mills, a secretary at the British Arts Council, whom he had known since 1953. Mills followed Boyd to the United States in the late 1950s and was his personal assistant, friend and confidante for many years before marrying him in the mid-1970s.

== Death ==
Boyd died of a massive heart attack on 2 June 1977 at the age of 45 while playing golf with his wife, Elizabeth Mills, at the Porter Valley Country Club in Northridge, California. He was in talks to play the role of the Regimental Sergeant Major in Euan Lloyd's The Wild Geese before his death.

He was cremated and his ashes were interred in Oakwood Memorial Park Cemetery in Chatsworth, California. Mills was interred with him at the time of her death in 2007. He is also remembered on his parents' grave in the Clandeboye Cemetery, Bangor, Northern Ireland.

== Legacy ==
On 4 July 2018, the Ulster History Circle, a voluntary organisation which erects plaques across the province of Ulster to celebrate people of achievement, commemorated Stephen Boyd with a blue plaque close to his birthplace at 'Moygara', Shore Road, Whitehouse (Newtownabbey, Northern Ireland).

== Filmography ==
- Black 13 (1953) as Policeman (uncredited)
- Lilacs in the Spring (1954) as Beaumont's Poolside Companion (uncredited)
- An Alligator Named Daisy (1955) as Albert O'Shannon
- Born for Trouble (1955)
- The Man Who Never Was (1956) as Patrick O'Reilly
- A Hill in Korea (1956) as Pvt. Sims
- The Adventures of Aggie (1956–57)
- Seven Waves Away (1957) as Will McKinley
- Island in the Sun (1957) as Euan Templeton
- Seven Thunders (1957) as Dave
- Les bijoutiers du clair de lune (1958) as Lambert
- The Bravados (1958) as Bill Zachary
- Woman Obsessed (1959) as Fred Carter
- The Best of Everything (1959) as Mike Rice
- Ben-Hur (1959) as Messala
- The Big Gamble (1961) as Vic Brennan
- Lisa (1962) as Peter Jongman
- Jumbo (1962) as Sam Rawlins
- Imperial Venus (1962) as Jules de Canouville
- The Third Secret (1964) as Alex Stedman
- The Fall of the Roman Empire (1964) as Livius
- Genghis Khan (1965) as Jamuga
- The Oscar (1966) as Frank Fane
- The Poppy Is Also a Flower (1966) as Benson
- Fantastic Voyage (1966) as Grant
- The Bible: In the Beginning... (1966) as Nimrod
- The Caper of the Golden Bulls (1967) as Peter Churchman
- Assignment K (1968) as Philip Scott
- Shalako (1968) as Bosky Fulton
- Slaves (1969) as MacKay
- Carter's Army (1970, TV Movie) as Capt. Beau Carter
- Marta (1971) as Don Miguel
- African Story (1971) as Arnold Tiller
- Hannie Caulder (1971) as The Preacher (uncredited)
- The Great Swindle (1971) as Arturo
- Kill! Kill! Kill! Kill! (1971) as Brad Killian
- The Devil Has Seven Faces (1972) as Dave Barton
- The Hands of Cormac Joyce (1972, TV Movie) as Cormac Joyce
- Those Dirty Dogs (1973) as Cpt. Chadwood Willer
- The Big Game (1973) as Leyton van Dyk
- The Man Called Noon (1973) as Rimes
- The Treasure of Jamaica Reef (1974) as Hugo Graham
- The Left Hand of the Law (1975) as Lanza
- One Man Against the Organization (1975) as Inspector Stephen McCormick
- The Lives of Jenny Dolan (1975) as Joe Rossiter
- Potato Fritz (1976) as Bill Ardisson
- Lady Dracula (1977) as Count Dracula (Posthumously)
- The Squeeze (1977) as Vic (Posthumously)
- Women in Hospital (1977) as Dr. Oberhoff (Posthumously)
- Impossible Love (1977) as Alvaro (Posthumously)
- Hawaii Five-O (1977, TV Series) as Daniel Costigan (Posthumously)
