= Marisa Mell =

Austrian actress (1939–1992)

- Mell during the filming of Danger: Diabolik (1968)
- Born: Marlies Theres Moitzi; 24 February 1939; Graz, Nazi Germany (now Austria)
- Died: 16 May 1992 (aged 53); Vienna, Austria
- Occupation: Actress
- Spouse: Henri Tucci (m. 1959; div. 1963)
- Partner: Stephen Boyd (1970-1972)

Marisa Mell (born Marlies Theres Moitzi; 24 February 1939 – 16 May 1992) was an Austrian actress. Typecast as a femme fatale in European arthouse and genre films, she is best regarded for her performances as Eva Kant in Mario Bava's critically re-assessed Danger: Diabolik (1968), and the dual role of Susan Dumurrier/Monica Weston in Lucio Fulci's giallo One on Top of the Other (1969).

After garnering popularity by appearing in such films as Venusberg (1963), French Dressing (1964), Masquerade (1965), Casanova 70 (1965) and Secret Agent Super Dragon (1966), Mell's attempt to launch a Broadway and Hollywood career ended with the failure of her debut musical Mata Hari. She settled in Italy, where her high-profile love life and long association with Pier Luigi Torri, a playboy who later became one of the world's most-wanted fugitives, made her familiar to readers of tabloid press stories about the European jet set and elite Roman nightclubs. Her other notable films during this period include Anyone Can Play (1967), Marta (1971), Ben and Charlie (1972), Seven Blood-Stained Orchids (1972), Gang War in Milan (1973), Mahogany (1975), Casanova & Co. (1977) and Mad Dog Killer (1977).

Despite her typically resilient onscreen persona, Mell was privately a vulnerable figure who suffered from bad luck, ill-judged personal choices, and drug use. By the late 1980s, these factors had eroded the qualities that had earned her initial stardom, and she was forced to spend the remainder of her life in Austria, where she subsisted in straitened circumstances.

== Career ==
Mell left her home city of Graz to attend the Max Reinhardt drama school where her fellow students briefly included Senta Berger. After four years in stage work, she began to appear in starring roles in European films.

In 1963, she was involved in a serious automobile accident in France. For six hours she lay unconscious, unaware that she nearly lost her right eye. The disfigurement extended to her lip as well. She spent the next two years undergoing plastic surgery, and no damage to her face remained except for a distinctive curl of her upper lip.

After the Eurospy film Secret Agent Super Dragon (1966), she secured the title role in the "utterly calamitous" musical Mata Hari alongside Pernell Roberts. A preview performance in Washington, D.C. became infamous for its numerous technical problems, and producer David Merrick decided to close the production. For the rest of her life, Mell had difficulty acknowledging the failure, which may have played a part in her moving to Italy where her stories of a successful Broadway run were not challenged. She said she had turned down a lucrative seven-year Hollywood contract because "the contract was a whole book. I think that even to go to the toilet I would have needed a permission." In 1968, Mell had her best-known film role as Eva Kant in Danger: Diabolik (1968), which initially was poorly received but has been championed by later film critics. At this time, Mell was appearing in what were by Italian standards major productions, which got American releases, such as Lucio Fulci's early giallo One on Top of the Other (1969). She suffered the death of a prematurely born daughter in 1969, and never had another child.

Mell's name had been romantically linked with number of European and Hollywood male stars, but in Italy she was often the center of paparazzi stories along with Pier Luigi Torri, her aristocratic, nightclub-owning boyfriend. In 1971, he got into a series of legal difficulties over cocaine being supplied to his nightclub's clients, and fled the country on his yacht. After being arrested in London over a $300 million gold mine and bank scam, and in an ironic echo of Danger: Diabolik, Torri got out of his cell, made a daring and acrobatic rooftop escape, and evaded a huge search by infuriated British police; he eventually was recaptured in America after 18 months at large. As one of the more recognizable beauties in Italian film, Mell continued to work steadily throughout the 1970s, and posed for Italian Playboy.

Mell's marketability depended on her youth and stunning looks, which hardly faded even as she moved into middle age. In Italy, where she had been a genuine celebrity, her box-office appeal had declined by the late 1980s, hardly unusual for a woman of her age in that era. Mell's public profile was very low by her latter years although she obtained some acting work shortly before her 1992 death in Vienna, aged 53, from throat cancer.

== Selected filmography ==
- Das Licht der Liebe (1954) - (uncredited)
- Das Nachtlokal zum Silbermond (1959) - Liliane
- The Good Soldier Schweik (1960) - Olly (uncredited)
- Twenty Brave Men (1960) - Alka
- Wegen Verführung Minderjähriger (1960) - Inge
- Ordered to Love (1961) - Erika Meuring
- The Cry of the Wild Geese (1961) - Judith Gare
- The Puzzle of the Red Orchid (1962) - Lilian Ranger
- Dr (1962) - Klara
- Venusberg (1963) - Florentine
- Der grüne Kakadu (1963) - Léocadie
- A Man in His Prime (1964) - Brigitte
- The Last Ride to Santa Cruz (1964) - Juanita
- French Dressing (1964) - Françoise Fayol
- Masquerade (1965) - Sophie
- Casanova 70 (1965) - Thelma
- Diamond Walkers (1965) - Irene de Ridder
- City of Fear (1965) - Ilona
- Operation Double Cross (1965) - Frieda
- Secret Agent Super Dragon (1966) - Charity Farrel
- Objective 500 Million (1966) - Yo
- Che notte ragazzi! (1966) - Mónica
- Anyone Can Play (1967) - Paola
- Danger: Diabolik (1968) - Eva Kant
- Stuntman (1968) - Gloria Hall
- One on Top of the Other (1969) - Susan Dumurrier / Monica Weston
- Les belles au bois dormantes (1970) - Isabelle
- Senza via d'uscita (1970) - Michèle
- The Great Swindle (1971) - Carla
- Marta (1971) - Marta / Pilar
- Ben and Charlie (1972) - Sarah
- Seven Blood-Stained Orchids (1972) - Anna Sartori / Maria Sartori
- Alta tensión (1972) - Laura Moncada
- Where the Bullets Fly (1972) - Lulu 'Miss Dynamite' Belle
- Bella, ricca, lieve difetto fisico, cerca anima gemella (1973) - Paola
- Gang War in Milan (1973) - Jasmina Sanders
- Violent Blood Bath (1974) - Patricia Bataille
- La moglie giovane (1974) - Louisa
- Parapsycho – Spectrum of Fear (1975) - Greta
- La encadenada (1975) - Gina / Elisabeth
- Mahogany (1975) - Carlotta Gavina
- Taxi Love - Servizio per signora (1976)
- Born Winner (1976) - Jusy
- Loves, Beds and Betrayals (1977) - Greta
- Casanova & Co. (1977) - Duchess of Cornaro
- Es muss nicht immer Kaviar sein (1977, TV series) - Chantal
- Mad Dog Killer (1977) - Giuliana
- Obscene Desire (1978) - Amanda
- Ring of Darkness (1979) - Agatha
- Under Siege (1980) - Kim Lombard
- La liceale al mare con l'amica di papà (1980) - Violante - wife of Massimo
- Peccati a Venezia (1980) - Melissa
- La compagna di viaggio (1980) - Woman with hat-veil
- Febbre a 40! (1980) - Linda Martin
- La dottoressa preferisce i marinai (1981) - Mrs. Clara Morelli
- Corpi nudi (1983) - Marisa
- Seifenblasen (1984) - Fernsehjournalistin
- La tempesta (1988)
- Quest for the Mighty Sword (1990) - Nephele
- Sensazioni d'amore (1990) - Signora Elena Aloisi
- I Love Vienna (1991) - Selina (final film role)
