= Those Dirty Dogs =

1973 film

- Directed by: Giuseppe Rosati
- Written by: Enrique Llovet; Giuseppe Rosati; Carlo Veo
- Starring: Gianni Garko; Stephen Boyd
- Cinematography: Godofredo Pacheco
- Music by: Nico Fidenco
- Release date: 1973
- Language: English/Italian

Those Dirty Dogs (Italian: Campa carogna... la taglia cresce, Spanish: Los cuatro de Fort Apache, also known as Charge!) is a 1973 Italian-Spanish Spaghetti Western film written and directed by Giuseppe Rosati and starring Gianni Garko and Stephen Boyd. The film was made in the later part of the Spaghetti Western boom. As such it features such latter-day genre elements as self-parody, guffaw humour, near-slapstick fight scenes (with accompanying sound effects), machine guns hidden in everyday household items, and bombastic villains.

== Plot ==
In Arizona, a nasty but capable bandit, Angel Sanchez, working for a mad Mexican boss who likes being called "El Supremo", leads the boss's ragtag bandit army in stealing several hundred army rifles, along with ammunition, from a U.S. army wagon-train. They kill all the army soldiers and abduct the daughter of a prominent local doctor.

Three American soldiers, Captain Chadwell, Lieutenant Junger and Sergeant Smith, are sent by Washington to recover the weaponry, or failing that to destroy them so they cannot be used against the army. They get help from a blond adventurer, Koran, a bounty hunter who carries a pink umbrella and quotes extensively from the Moslem holy book (or so he claims it to be), whose primary interest is in capturing and turning in Angel Sanchez for the $1,000 price on his head.

== Notes ==
The film was scored by Italian soundtrack composer Nico Fidenco. He and co-star Stephen Boyd co-wrote the song “The Wind in My Face”, which runs during the film's opening credits. Boyd also sang the song.

== Cast ==
- Gianni Garko as Korano
- Stephen Boyd as Cpt. Chadwood Willer
- Howard Ross as Lt. Younger
- Simón Andreu as Angelo Sanchez
- Harry Baird as Corp. Washington Smith
- Teresa Gimpera as Miss Adams
- Alfredo Mayo as General Mueller, El Supremo
- Helga Liné as Maria
- Mirella Dogan as Manola
- Enzo Fiermonte as Doctor
- Gabriella Giorgelli as Mexican Woman
- Andrea Scotti as Mexican Man
- Daniele Vargas as Major
- Lee Burton as Corporal
- Furio Meniconi as Boarding House Owner
- Nazzareno Zamperla as Soldier (uncredited)
