= Abe Lincoln in Illinois (Hallmark Hall of Fame) =

- Hallmark Hall of Fame episode
- Promotional photo of Jason Robards from "Abe Lincoln in Illinois"
- Episode no.: Season 13; Episode 3
- Directed by: George Schaefer
- Written by: Robert Hartung (adaptation)
- Based on: Abe Lincoln in Illinois; 1938 play by Robert E. Sherwood
- Original air date: February 5, 1964
- Running time: 1:17:52

Guest appearances
- Jason Robards as Abe Lincoln; Kate Reid as Mary Todd; James Broderick as Joshua Speed

Episode chronology
| ← Previous "A Cry of Angels" | Next → "Little Moon of Alban" |

"Abe Lincoln in Illinois" was an American television play broadcast on NBC on February 5, 1964, as part of the television series, Hallmark Hall of Fame. It was adapted from Robert E. Sherwood's 1938 Pulitzer Prize-winning play. Jason Robards was nominated for an Emmy as outstanding single performance by an actor in a leading role for his portrayal of Lincoln.

== Plot ==
The program follows the plot of Robert E. Sherwood's 1938 play, Abe Lincoln in Illinois. It covers the life of Abraham Lincoln before moving to Washington, D.C. It covers his life in New Salem in the 1830s, in Springfield in the 1840s, his courtship of Mary Todd Lincoln, and the Lincoln–Douglas debates.

== Cast ==
The cast included:

- Jason Robards as Abe Lincoln
- Kate Reid as Mary Todd
- James Broderick as Joshua Speed
- Hiram Sherman as Judge Bowling Green
- Douglass Watson as Ninian Edwards
- Burt Brinckerhoff as William Herndon
- Roy Poole as Seth Gale
- Staats Cotsworth as Crimmin
- Mildred Trares as Ann Rutledge
- William Hansen as Mentor Graham
- James Congdon as Jack
- Don Gantry as Jasp
- Nan McFarland as Nancy Green
- Joan Hotchkis as Elizabeth Edwards
- Toni Darnay as Aggie Gale
- Jack Bittner as Stephen A. Douglas
- Tom Slater as Robert Lincoln
- Casey Peters as Willie Lincoln
- Harry Ellerbe as Barrick
- Frederic Tozere as Sturveson

== Production ==
The program was broadcast on NBC on February 5, 1964, as part of the television program Hallmark Hall of Fame. George Schaefer was the producer and director. Robert Hartung was the associate producer and also wrote the television adaption from Robert E. Sherwood's Pulitzer Prize-winning 1938 play. Jason Robards portrayed Lincoln and received an Emmy nomination for outstanding single performance by an actor in a leading role.
