= Bob Hope Presents the Chrysler Theatre =

American anthology TV series (1963–1967)

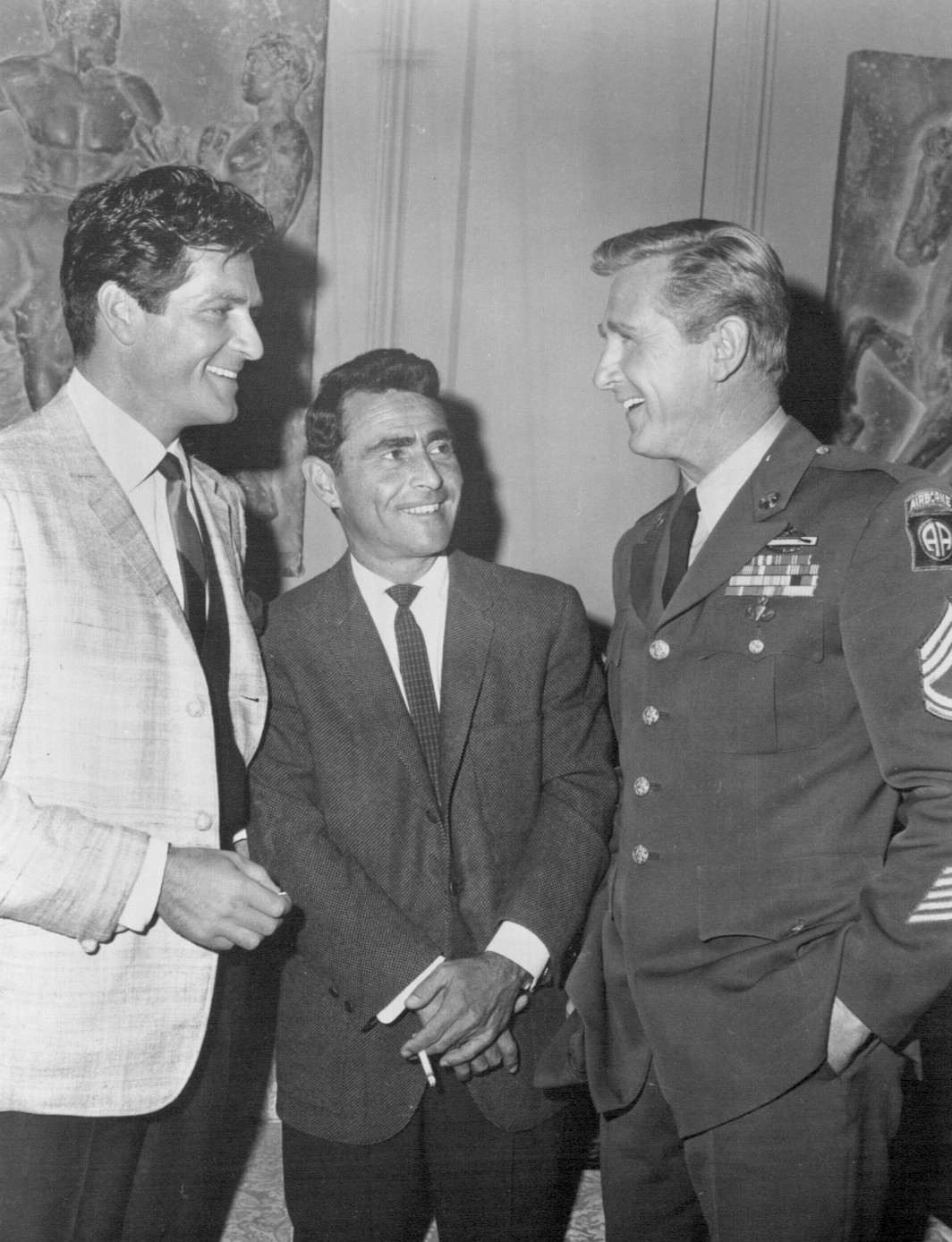
- Hugh O'Brian, Rod Serling, and Lloyd Bridges. O'Brian and Bridges appeared in the Serling-penned episode "Exit From a Plane in Flight".
- Also known as: Universal Star Time; Theatre of the Stars
- Genre: Anthology
- Presented by: Bob Hope
- Composers: Johnny Williams; Bernard Herrmann; Benny Carter; Cyril Mockridge; Dizzy Gillespie; Quincy Jones; Les Brown; Johnny Mandel; Lalo Schifrin
- Country of origin: United States
- Original language: English
- No. of seasons: 4
- No. of episodes: 107

Production
- Executive producer: Roy Huggins
- Producers: Richard Berg; Jack Laird; Richard Lewis
- Running time: 48 mins.
- Production companies: Hovue Productions, in association with Universal Television

Original release
- Network: NBC
- Release: October 4, 1963 – May 17, 1967

Bob Hope Presents the Chrysler Theatre is an American anthology series, sponsored by Chrysler, which ran on NBC from 1963 through 1967. The show was hosted by Bob Hope, but it had a variety of formats, including musical, dramatic, and comedy.

== Overview ==
The program included such events as an adaptation of One Day in the Life of Ivan Denisovich, starring Jason Robards (from the 1962 novel by Aleksandr Solzhenitsyn); The Seven Little Foys, starring Mickey Rooney, Eddie Foy Jr. and the Osmond Brothers; Think Pretty, a musical starring Fred Astaire and Barrie Chase; and Groucho Marx in "Time for Elizabeth", a televised adaptation of a play that Marx and Norman Krasna wrote in 1948.

Generally, each episode ran for an hour, although for some 'special presentations', NBC expanded the broadcast time to 90 minutes.

Hope was paid US$25,000 ($266,089 in 2025 dollars) per week for those episodes he merely introduced, and US$500,000 ($5,321,782 in 2025 dollars) for those in which he starred. Hope's performances consisted of his typical joke- and celebrity-filled blackout sketches. These were usually called Chrysler Presents a Bob Hope Special. Every season, Hope traveled to Vietnam for Christmas, to entertain the troops.

Actors who appeared in episodes included Phyllis Avery, John Cassavetes, Broderick Crawford, Angie Dickinson, Peter Falk, Sean Garrison, Sam Levene, Jack Lord, Carol Lynley, Ida Lupino, George Maharis, Darren McGavin, Dina Merrill, Hugh O'Brian, Suzanne Pleshette, Cliff Robertson, William Shatner, Robert Stack, Robert Wagner, Stuart Whitman, Shelley Winters, and Robert Young.

Notable directors included Sydney Pollack, Stuart Rosenberg, John Cassavetes, Sam Peckinpah, Ida Lupino, and Daniel Petrie.

Several episodes were rerun from 1968 through 1972 under several different titles: NBC Adventure Theatre (1971–1972), NBC Action Playhouse (1971–1972), NBC Comedy Playhouse (1968–1970) and NBC Comedy Theater (1971–1972). The Hope introductions were replaced by other hosts, such as Peter Marshall (who hosted "Action"), Art Fleming ("Adventure" in 1971), Ed McMahon ("Adventure" in 1972), Monty Hall ("Comedy Playhouse" in 1968) and Jack Kelly ("Comedy Playhouse" in 1970, and "Comedy Theater").

In syndication, the series was presented as Universal Star Time and Theatre of the Stars, minus Hope's opening and closing segments.

Several of the dramatic episodes of the series aired in Britain on BBC2 as Impact, which also included episodes of Kraft Suspense Theatre.

== Awards and nominations ==
The show won a total of seven Primetime Emmy Awards and was nominated for six more. Among them were the following:

For her performance in the episode "Two is the Number" (1964), Shelley Winters won for outstanding lead actress in a miniseries or movie.

Simone Signoret won for outstanding lead actress for her performance in "A Small Rebellion" (1966) which also starred Sam Levene as theatre owner Noel Greb and George Maharis as playwright Michael Kolinos.

Cliff Robertson won for outstanding lead actor for his performance in "The Game" (1966).

Rod Steiger won for outstanding lead actor for his performance in "A Slow Fade to Black" (1964).

Sydney Pollack was nominated for directing "Something About Lee Wiley" (1963), and won for directing "The Game" (1966).

Rod Serling won for writing the episode, "It's Mental Work" (1964).

Additionally, the show was nominated twice for the Directors Guild of America Award and twice for the Edgar Allan Poe Award.
