= 8th Venice International Film Festival =

Italian film festival in 1947

- Official festival poster by Giorgio Zucchiatti
- Location: Venice, Italy
- Founded: 1932
- Awards: Grand International Prize of Venice: The Strike
- Festival date: 23 August – 15 September 1947
- Website: www.labiennale.org/en/cinema/

Venice Film Festival chronology
- 9th 7th

The 8th Venice International Film Festival was held from 23 August to 15 September 1947. Screenwriter Vinicio Marinucci was appointed as the president of the jury.

Formally, it still was not the Golden Lion to designate the highest honor of the event. The main prize was known as the Grand International Prize of Venice, which was awarded to The Strike, directed by Karel Steklý.

== Jury ==
=== Main Competition (Venezia 8) ===
- Vinicio Marinucci, Italian screenwriter and journalist - Jury President
- Antonín Martin Brousil, Czechoslovak film critic and historian
- Jeanne Contini, American journalist
- Jacques Ibert, French composer
- Dimitri Jeriomin, Soviet writer
- William Karol, Mexican film producer
- Fabrizio Malipiero, Danish entrepreneur
- Hugo Mauerhofer, Swiss film scholar
- Cirly Ray, British journalist

== Official selection ==
=== In Competition ===
The following films were selected for the main international competition:

English title	Original title	Director(s)	Production country
Admiral Nakhimov	Адмирал Нахимов	Vsevolod Pudovkin	Soviet Union
Angelina	L'onorevole Angelina	Luigi Zampa	Italy
Bethsabée		Léonide Moguy	France
The Bouquinquant Brothers	Les frères Bouquinquant	Louis Daquin	France
Čapek's Tales	Čapkovy povídky	Martin Frič	Czechoslovakia
Devil in the Flesh	Le Diable au corps	Claude Autant-Lara	France
Ditte, Child of Man	Ditte menneskebarn	Bjarne Henning-Jensen	Denmark
Dr. Kotnis Ki Amar Kahani	डॉक्टर कोटनिस की अमर कहानी	V. Shantaram	India
Enamorada		Emilio Fernández	Mexico
Farrebique, or the Four Seasons	Farrebique ou Les quatre saisons	Georges Rouquier	France
Flesh Will Surrender	Il delitto di Giovanni Episcopo	Alberto Lattuada	Italy
Frieda		Basil Dearden	United Kingdom
Gallant Journey		William A. Wellman	United States
The Great Glinka	Глинка	Lev Arnshtam	Soviet Union
Iris and the Lieutenant	Iris och löjtnantshjärta	Alf Sjöberg	Sweden
It Happened on 5th Avenue		Roy Del Ruth	United States
La mujer de todos		Julio Bracho	Mexico
La selva de fuego		Fernando de Fuentes	Mexico
Leave Her to Heaven		John M. Stahl	United States
Madness Rules	Matto regiert	Leopold Lindtberg	Switzerland
Major Barbara		Gabriel Pascal, Harold French, David Lean	United Kingdom
Money	Pengar	Nils Poppe	Sweden
Monsieur Vincent		Maurice Cloche	France
The Murderers Are Among Us	Die Mörder sind unter uns	Wolfgang Staudte	Germany
Odd Man Out		Carol Reed	United Kingdom
The Overlanders		Harry Watt	United Kingdom, Australia
The Pearl	La perla	Emilio Fernández	Mexico, United States
Quai des Orfèvres		Henri-Georges Clouzot	France
Reina santa		Rafael Gil	Spain, Portugal
Shakuntala	शकुन्तला	V. Shantaram	India
Spellbound		Alfred Hitchcock	United States
The Story of G.I. Joe		William A. Wellman	United States
The Stranger		Orson Welles	United States
The Strike	Siréna	Karel Steklý	Czechoslovakia
Temptation Harbour		Lance Comfort	United Kingdom
They Made Me a Fugitive		Alberto Cavalcanti	United Kingdom
Those Blasted Kids	De pokkers unger	Astrid Henning-Jensen, Bjarne Henning-Jensen	Denmark
Tomorrow Is Forever		Irving Pichel	United States
Torment	Hets	Alf Sjöberg	Sweden
Tragic Hunt	Caccia tragica	Giuseppe De Santis	Italy
Twilight	Crepúsculo	Julio Bracho	Mexico
Uomini senza domani		Gianni Vernuccio	Italy

== Official Awards ==
The following official awards were presented at the 8th edition:

=== Main Competition ===
- Grand International Prize of Venice: The Strike by Karel Steklý
- International Award for Best Actress: Anna Magnani for Angelina
- International Award for Best Actor: Pierre Fresnay for Monsieur Vincent
- Best Cinematography: The Pearl
- Best Director: Henri-Georges Clouzot for Quai des Orfèvres
- Best Score: The Strike
- Best Screenplay: Spring
