= A Woman Unknown =

A Woman Unknown or Woman Unknown may refer to:

- A Woman Unknown, a 2012 novel by Frances Brody
- A Woman Unknown: Voices from a Spanish Life, a 1999 memoir by Lucia Graves
- Woman Unknown (film), a 2026 film by May el-Toukhy
