= Mathilde Arcel =

Danish actress

- Arcel in 2026
- Born: Mathilde Arcel Fock; 25 July 1996 (age 30); Copenhagen, Denmark
- Education: DASPA
- Occupation: Actress
- Years active: 2009 - present
- Partner: Ask Berntsen
- Parent: Nikolaj Arcel (uncle)

Mathilde Arcel is a Danish actress. Most known for her performance in the drama film Woman Unknown (2026), for which she won the Volpi Cup for Best Actress at the 83rd Venice International Film Festival and was nominated for the European Film Award for Best Actress.

== Early life ==
Arcel was born on 25 July 1996, in Copenhagen. She is the youngest daughter of the Danish actress Nastja Arcel and Danish theatre director Mikael Fock.

== Career ==
Arcel's career started at just 13 years old, playing the lead in the Danish TV series Mille (2009). She finished her education at the Danish National School of Performing Arts (DASPA) in Aarhus in 2020.

In 2025, Arcel appeared in a supporting role in Second Victims, earning Bodil Award and Robert Award nominations. Her performance in Woman Unknown (2026) as Marie, a young nanny and housemaid harbouring a secret shortly after Nazi occupation of Denmark, was her breakout role. She received critical acclaim at the 83rd Venice International Film Festival, where she won the Volpi Cup for Best Actress.

== Personal life ==
Her uncle is the Danish filmmaker Nikolaj Arcel.

She is currently in a relationship with Ask Berntsen.

== Filmography ==
=== Feature films ===
Year	English Title	Original Title	Role
2024	Mørkeland		Emma
2025	Second Victims	Det andet offer	Emilie
2025	Special Unit: The First Murder	Rejseholdet - det første mord	Camilla Holdt
2026	Woman Unknown	Kvinde, ukendt	Marie

=== Television ===
Year	Title	Role	Episodes
2009	Mille	Mille	10 episodes
2022	The Shift	Laura	1 episode
2023	Dansegarderoben	Anne	1 episode
2023	Agent	Line	8 episodes
2025	Oxen	Louise	1 episode
2026	Uniformen	Liv	3 episodes
