= 20th Venice International Film Festival =

Italian film festival in 1959

- Location: Venice, Italy
- Founded: 1932
- Awards: Golden Lion: The Great War; General della Rovere
- Festival date: 23 August – 6 September 1959
- Website: Website

Venice Film Festival chronology
- 21st 19th

The 20th annual Venice International Film Festival was held from 23 August to 6 September 1959.

Italian film critic Luigi Chiarini was the Jury President for the main competition. The Golden Lion was awarded to The Great War directed by Mario Monicelli and General della Rovere directed by Roberto Rossellini.

== Jury ==
- Luigi Chiarini, Italian film theorist and filmmaker - Jury President
- Georges Altman, French journalist
- Sergei Bondarchuk, Soviet filmmaker and actor
- Ralph Forte, American journalist
- Ernst Kruger, German film producer
- Roger Maxwell, British actor
- Vinicio Marinucci, Italian film critic and filmmaker
- Luis Gómez Mesa, Spanish film historian and critic
- Dario Zanelli, Italian film critic

== Official Sections ==
The following films were selected to be screened:

=== Main Competition ===
English title	Original title	Director(s)	Production country
Anatomy of a Murder		Otto Preminger	United States
Conflagration	炎上	Kon Ichikawa	Japan
The Boy and the Bridge		Kevin McClory	United Kingdom
Double Agents	La nuit des espions	Robert Hossein	France
Esterina		Carlo Lizzani	Italy
General Della Rovere	Il generale Della Rovere	Roberto Rossellini	Italy
The Great War	La grande guerra	Mario Monicelli	Italy
Life in Your Hands	В твоих руках жизнь	Nikolai Rozantsev	Soviet Union
The Magician	Ansiktet	Ingmar Bergman	Sweden
Night Train	Pociąg	Jerzy Kawalerowicz	Poland
Sleepless Years	Álmatlan évek	Félix Máriássy	Hungary
Sonatas		Juan Antonio Bardem	Spain
Stalingrad: Dogs, Do You Want to Live Forever?	Hunde, wollt ihr ewig leben	Frank Wisbar	West Germany
The Doctor's Horrible Experiment	Le Testament du docteur Cordelier	Jean Renoir	France
Web of Passion	À double tour	Claude Chabrol	France

=== Out of Competition ===
English title	Original title	Director(s)	Production country
Some Like It Hot		Billy Wilder	United States

=== Informativa ===
English title	Original title	Director(s)	Production country
The 400 Blows	Les Quatre Cents Coups	François Truffaut	France
Araya		Margot Benacerraf	Venezuela
Ashes and Diamonds	Popiól I Diament	Andrzej Wajda	Poland
Bari Theke Paliye		Ritwik Ghatak	India
Black Orpheus	Orfeu Negro	Marcel Camus	France, Brazil, Italy
Campo arado		Leo Fleider	Argentina
Come Back, Africa		Lionel Rogosin	United States
The Crossroads	La encrucijada	Alfonso Balcázar	Spain, France
The Day Shall Dawn	Jago Hua Savera	A.J. Kardar	Pakistan
The Day the War Ended	Первый день мира	Yakov Segel	Soviet Union
Los desarraigados		Gilberto Gazcón	Mexico
The Diary of Anne Frank		George Stevens	United States
Five in a Million	Pet z milionu	Zbynek Brynych	Czechoslovakia
For Whom the Larks Sing	Akiket a pacsirta elkísér	László Ranódy	Hungary
Four Kilometers Per Hour	Cetiri kilometra na sat	Velimir Stojanović	Yugoslavia
En la ardiente oscuridad		Daniel Tinayre	Argentina
Fanfare		Bert Haanstra	Netherlands
A Hero of Our Times	Un eroe dei nostri tempi	Mario Monicelli	Italy
Hiroshima mon amour		Alain Resnais	France, Japan
I Am Free	Ana hurra	Salah Abouseif	Egypt
Jazz on a Summer's Day		Aram Avakian, Bert Stern	United States
Kiku to Isamu		Tadashi Imai	Japan
A Midsummer Night's Dream	Sen noci svatojanske	Jirí Trnka	Czechoslovakia
The Naked General	裸の大将	Hiromichi Horikawa	Japan
Nazarín		Luis Buñuel	México
North by Northwest		Alfred Hitchcock	United States
Osma vrata		Nikola Tanhofer	Yugoslavia
Paradise and Fire Oven	Paradies und Feuerofen	Herbert Viktor	West Germany
People in the Net	Menschen im Netz	Franz Peter Wirth	West Germany
The Savage Eye		Ben Maddow, Sidney Meyers, Joseph Strick	United States
Shinel	Шинель	Aleksey Batalov	Soviet Union
Small Dramas	Male dramaty	Janusz Nasfeter	Poland
Stars	Sterne	Konrad Wolf	West Germany
Stories About Lenin	Рассказы о Ленине	Sergei Yutkevich	Soviet Union
Thirst for Love	Sed de amor	Alfonso Corona Blake	Mexico
Tiga Dara		Usmar Ismail	Indonesia
Tiger Bay		J. Lee Thompson	United Kingdom
Time Stood Still	Il tempo si è fermato	Ermanno Olmi	Italy
Train Without a Timetable	Vlak bez voznog reda	Veljko Bulajic	Yugoslavia
Tu es Pierre		Philippe Agostini	France

== Official Awards ==
- Golden Lion:
  - The Great War by Mario Monicelli
  - General della Rovere by Roberto Rossellini
- Special Jury Prize: The Magician by Ingmar Bergman
- Volpi Cup for Best Actor: James Stewart for Anatomy of a Murder
- Volpi Cup for Best Actress: Madeleine Robinson for Web of Passion
- Volpi Cup Special Mention:
  - Carla Gravina for Esterina
  - Lucyna Winnicka for Night Train
  - Hannes Messemer for General della Rovere
  - Alberto Sordi for The Great War

== Independent Awards ==
=== New Cinema Award ===
- The Magician by Ingmar Bergman

=== FIPRESCI Prize ===
- Ashes and Diamonds by Andrzej Wajda

=== OCIC Award ===
- General della Rovere by Roberto Rossellini

=== Pasinetti Award ===
- The Magician by Ingmar Bergman
- Parallel Sections: Come Back, Africa by Lionel Rogosin
