= 11th Venice International Film Festival =

Italian film festival in 1950

- Festival poster
- Location: Venice, Italy
- Founded: 1932
- Awards: Golden Lion of Saint Mark: Justice Is Done
- Festival date: 20 August – 10 September 1950
- Website: Website

Venice Film Festival chronology
- 12th 10th

The 11th annual Venice International Film Festival was held from 20 August to 10 September 1950.

The Golden Lion of Saint Mark was awarded to Justice Is Done by André Cayatte.

== History ==
Recognized as the oldest film festival in the world, the Venice Film Festival, made its entry in 1932 in Venice, Italy. Founded by Count Giuseppe Volpi di Misurata, the initial hosting of the festival was done in the Hotel Excelsior in Venice. The participating countries in the 1940s were just a handful owing to the breakout of World War II. The turn-out of participating countries, however, shot up in the 1950s and the festival grew internationally. Even films from Japan and India made their entry in that year. With the introduction of new genre of films, the festival took to newer heights and gained worldwide popularity. The festival helped film directors from all round the world in the betterment of their careers.

== Jury ==
- Mario Gromo, Italian writer and film critic - Jury President
- Umbro Apollonio
- Antonio Baldini, Italian writer
- Piero Gadda Conti, Italian film critic
- Ermanno Contini
- Arturo Lanocita
- Gian Luigi Rondi, Italian screenwriter
- Turi Vasile, Italian producer, film critic and director
- Adone Zecchi

== Official Sections ==
The following films were screened at the 1950 Venice Film Festival.

=== Main Competition ===
English title	Original title	Director(s)	Production country
All the King's Men		Robert Rossen	United States
The Asphalt Jungle		John Huston	United States
Bed for Two; Rendezvous with Luck	Rendez-vous avec la chance	Emil E. Reinert	
The Blue Lamp		Basil Dearden	United Kingdom
Caged		John Cromwell	United States
Cinderella		Clyde Geronimi, Hamilton Luske, Wilfred Jackson	United States
The Flowers of St. Francis	Francesco, giullare di Dio	Roberto Rossellini	Italy
Give Us This Day		Edward Dmytryk	
God Needs Man	Dieu a besoin des hommes	Jean Delannoy	France
Gone to Earth		Michael Powell and Emeric Pressburger	United Kingdom
The Great Manhunt		Sidney Gilliat	United Kingdom
Father's Dilemma	Prima comunione	Alessandro Blasetti	Italy
Justice Is Done	Justice est faite	André Cayatte	France
La Ronde		Max Ophüls	France
Life Begins Tomorrow	La Vie Commence Demain	Nicole Védrès	
The Orplid Mystery	Epilog - Das Geheimnis der Orplid	Helmut Käutner	
Once a Thief		W. Lee Wilder	
Only a Mother	Bara en mor	Alf Sjöberg	Sweden
Orpheus	Orphée	Jean Cocteau	
Panic in the Streets		Elia Kazan	United States
Rosauro Castro		Roberto Gavaldón	
September Affair		William Dieterle	
Stromboli		Roberto Rossellini	Italy
Tomorrow Is Too Late	Domani è troppo tardi	Léonide Moguy	Italy

== Official Awards ==
=== Main Competition ===
- Golden Lion of Saint Mark: Justice Is Done by André Cayatte
- Best Italian Film: Tomorrow Is Too Late by Léonide Moguy
- Volpi Cup for Best Actor: Sam Jaffe for The Asphalt Jungle
- Volpi Cup for Best Actress: Eleanor Parker for Caged
- Best Original Screenplay: Jacques Natanson & Max Ophüls for La Ronde
- Best Cinematography: Martin Bodin for Only a Mother
- Best Original Music: Brian Easdale for Gone to Earth
- Outstanding Technical Contribution: Jean d'Eaubonne for La Ronde

== Independent Awards ==
=== International Award ===
- God Needs Man by Jean Delannoy
- Father's Dilemma by Alessandro Blasetti
- Panic in the Streets by Elia Kazan

=== OCIC Award ===
- God Needs Man by Jean Delannoy

=== Pasinetti Award ===
- Give Us This Day by Edward Dmytryk
- Special Prize: Cinderella and In Beaver Valley by Walt Disney
