= Volpi Cup for Best Actress =

Venice Film Festival annual award

- Coppa Volpi per la migliore interpretazione femminile (Italian)
- 2026 recipient: Mathilde Arcel
- Awarded for: Best Performance by an Actress
- Country: Italy
- Presented by: Venice Film Festival
- First award: 1932
- Currently held by: Mathilde Arcel for Woman Unknown (2026)
- Website: labiennale.org/en/cinema

The Volpi Cup for Best Actress is an award presented by the Venice Film Festival. It is given by the festival jury in honor of an actress who has delivered an outstanding performance from the films in the competition slate. It is named in honor of Count Giuseppe Volpi di Misurata, the founder of the festival.

Danish actress Mathilde Arcel was the most recent winner for her performance in Woman Unknown (2026), at the 83rd Venice International Film Festival.

== History ==
The first ceremony was held in 1932, when Helen Hayes received the Volpi Cup for the title role in The Sin of Madelon Claudet (1931)—this was the only time that the award was chosen by public voting. From 1942 to 1945, the festival was suspended because of World War II. The student protests in May 1968 opened a period of institutional changes, with no prizes were awarded from 1969 to 1979.

The name of the award has changed several times. In 1934, when Katharine Hepburn was honored for her role in Little Women it was the Great Gold Medal of the National Fascist Association for Entertainment. It was renamed the Volpi Cup for Best Actress the following year. The awards given from 1947 to 1949 were named the International Award for the Best Actress.

The Best Actress Award resumed in 1983. That year, Darling Légitimus became the first black woman to receive the award, for her work in Sugar Cane Alley. In 1992, Ingrid Bergman was honored posthumously for her performance in Europe '51, which was denied by the jury in 1952 because her voice was dubbed from Swedish into Italian (by Lydia Simoneschi). The award can be for leading or supporting roles with the exception of the period, when the additional award for Best Supporting Actress was given from 1993 to 1995. At the age of four, Victoire Thivisol became the youngest recipient for the title role in Ponette in 1996.

Since its inception, the award has been given to 68 actresses. Only four of them have won more than once: Shirley MacLaine, Isabelle Huppert, Valeria Golino and Cate Blanchett, who have each won the cup twice. Bette Davis is the only actress to win the award for her roles in two different films on the same competition; she won in 1937 for her contribution in Marked Woman and Kid Galahad. In 1988, the award was shared by two actresses in different films: Huppert in Story of Women and MacLaine in Madame Sousatzka. There have been two films, She's Been Away in 1989 and La Cérémonie in 1995, that garnered multiple winners in one year.

== Winners ==
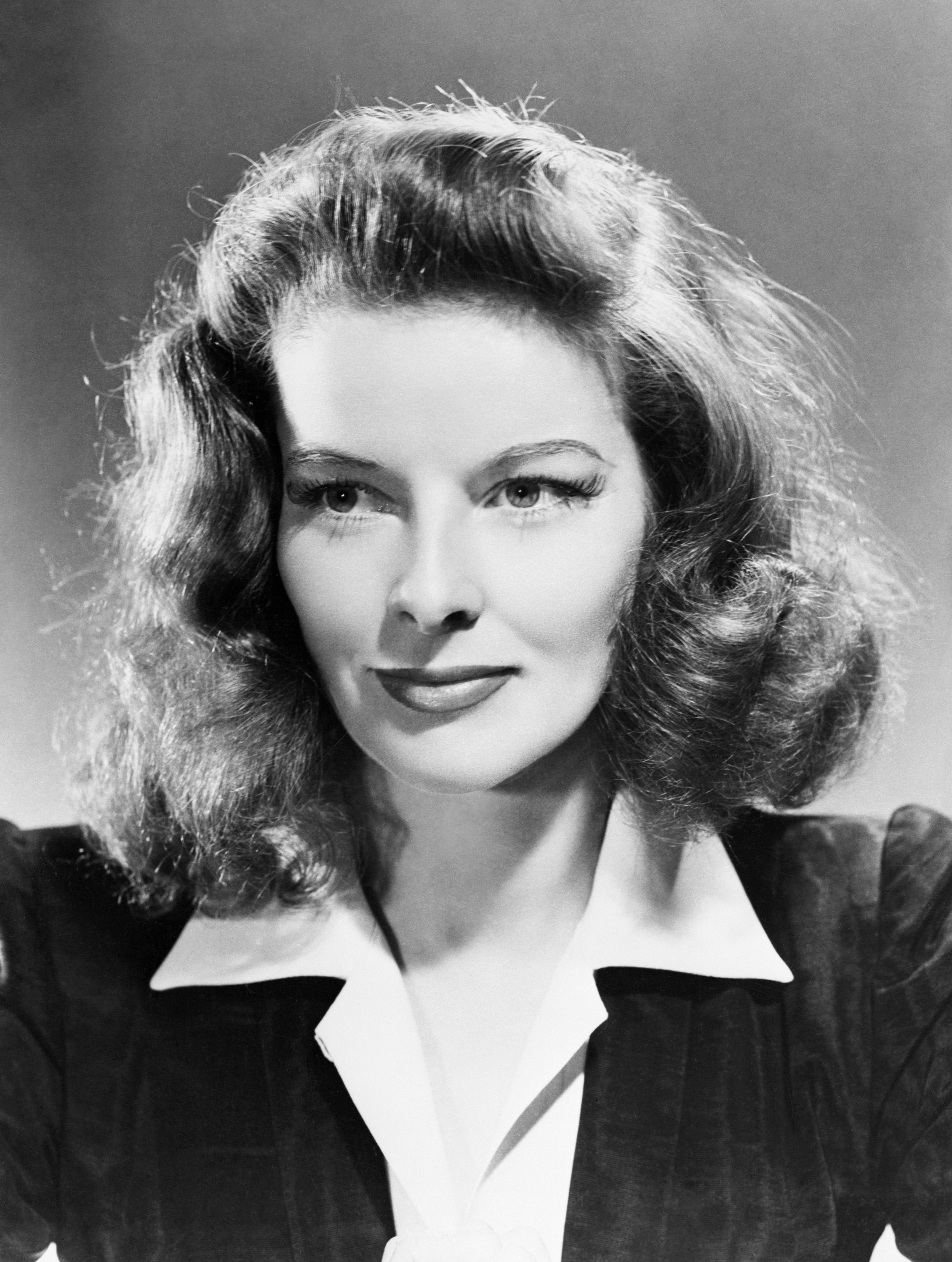
Katharine Hepburn won for Little Women (1933)

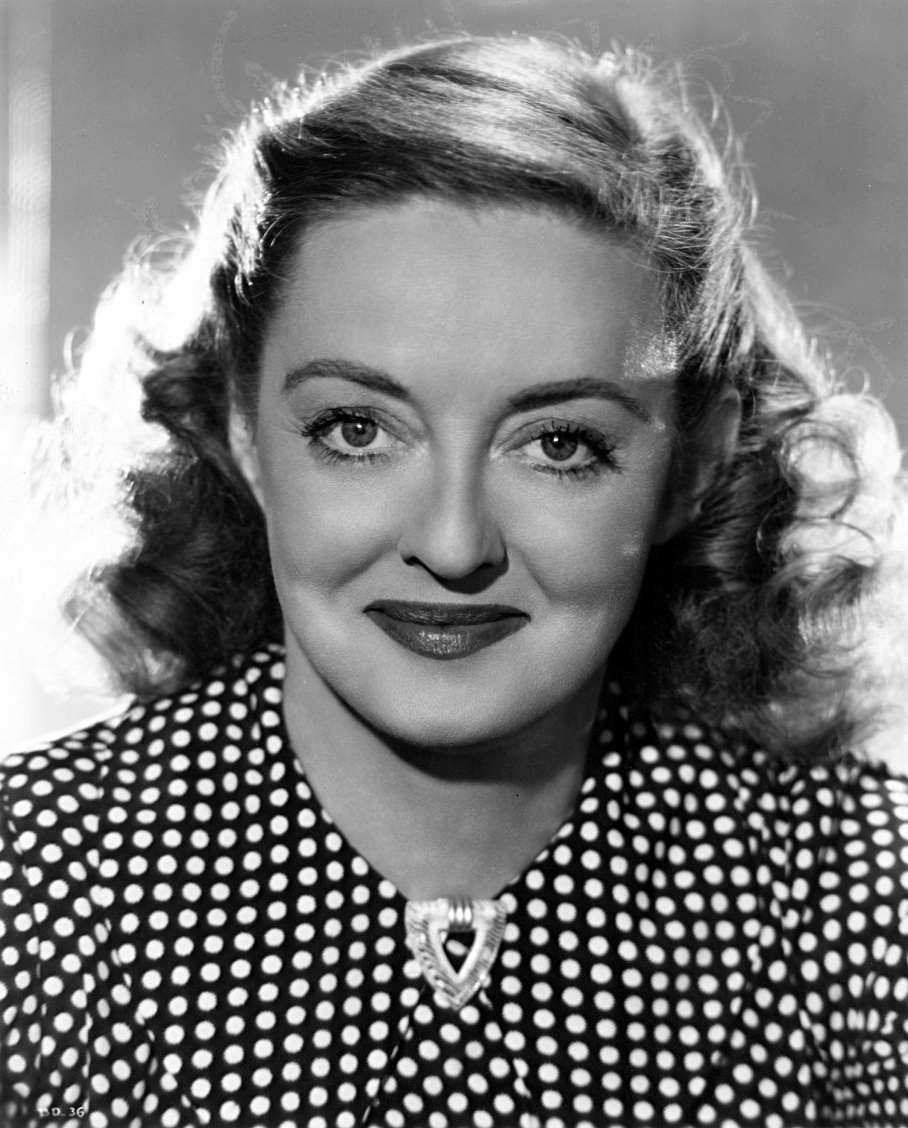
Bette Davis won for Marked Woman / Kid Galahad (1937)

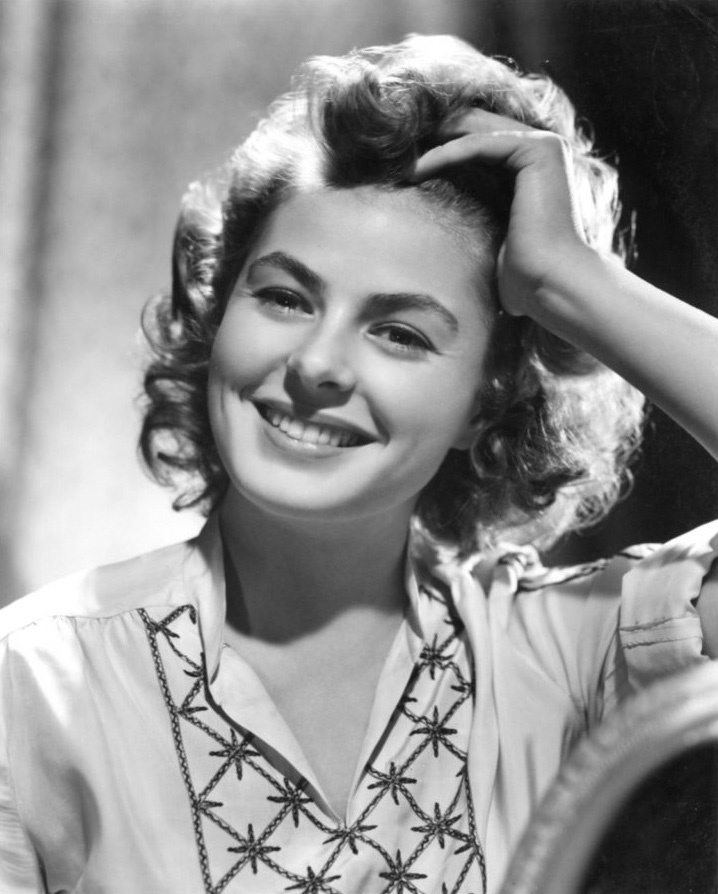
Ingrid Bergman won for Europe '51 (1952)

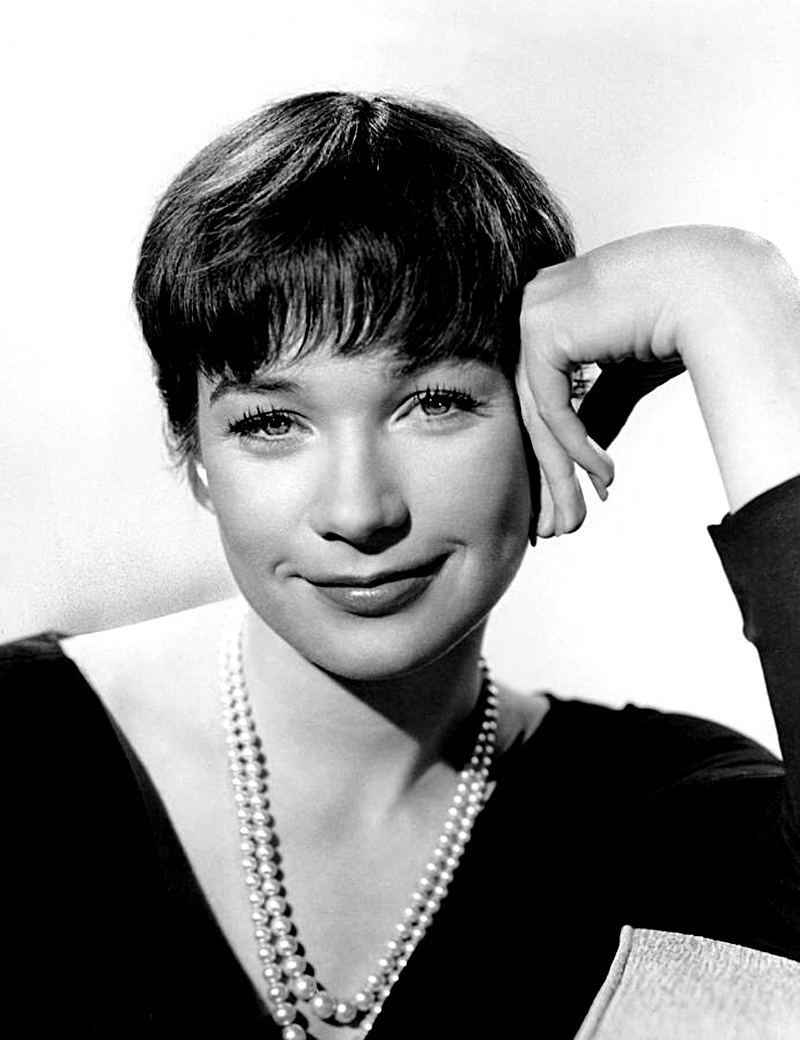
Shirley MacLaine won twice for The Apartment (1960) and Madame Sousatzka (1988)

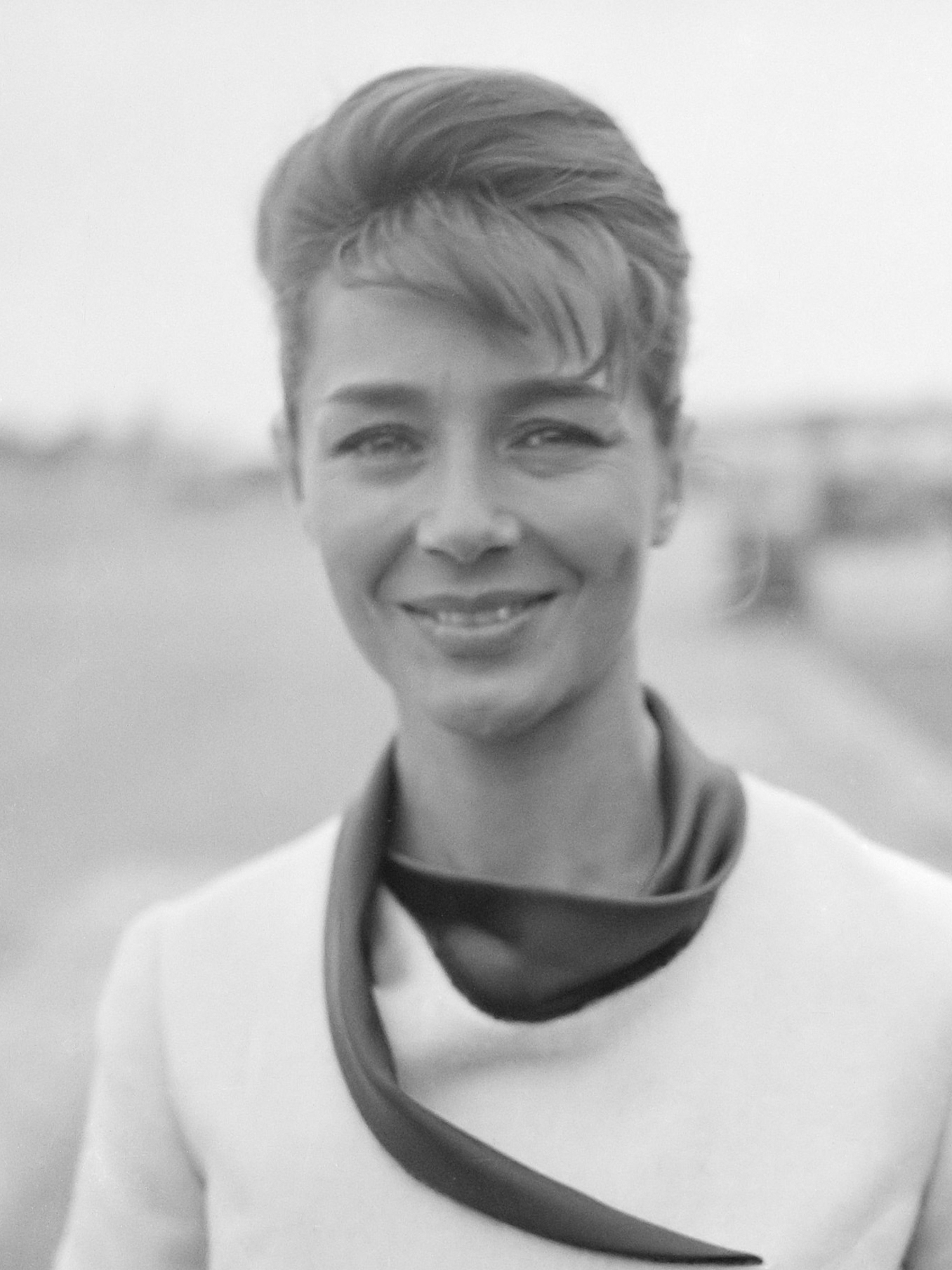
Emmanuelle Riva won for Thérèse Desqueyroux (1962)

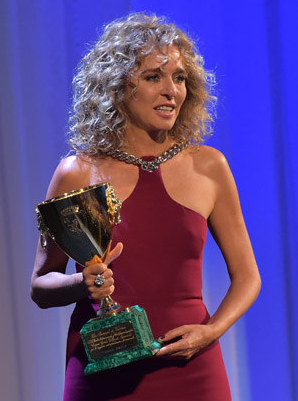
Valeria Golino won twice for A Tale of Love (1986) and Per amor vostro (2015)

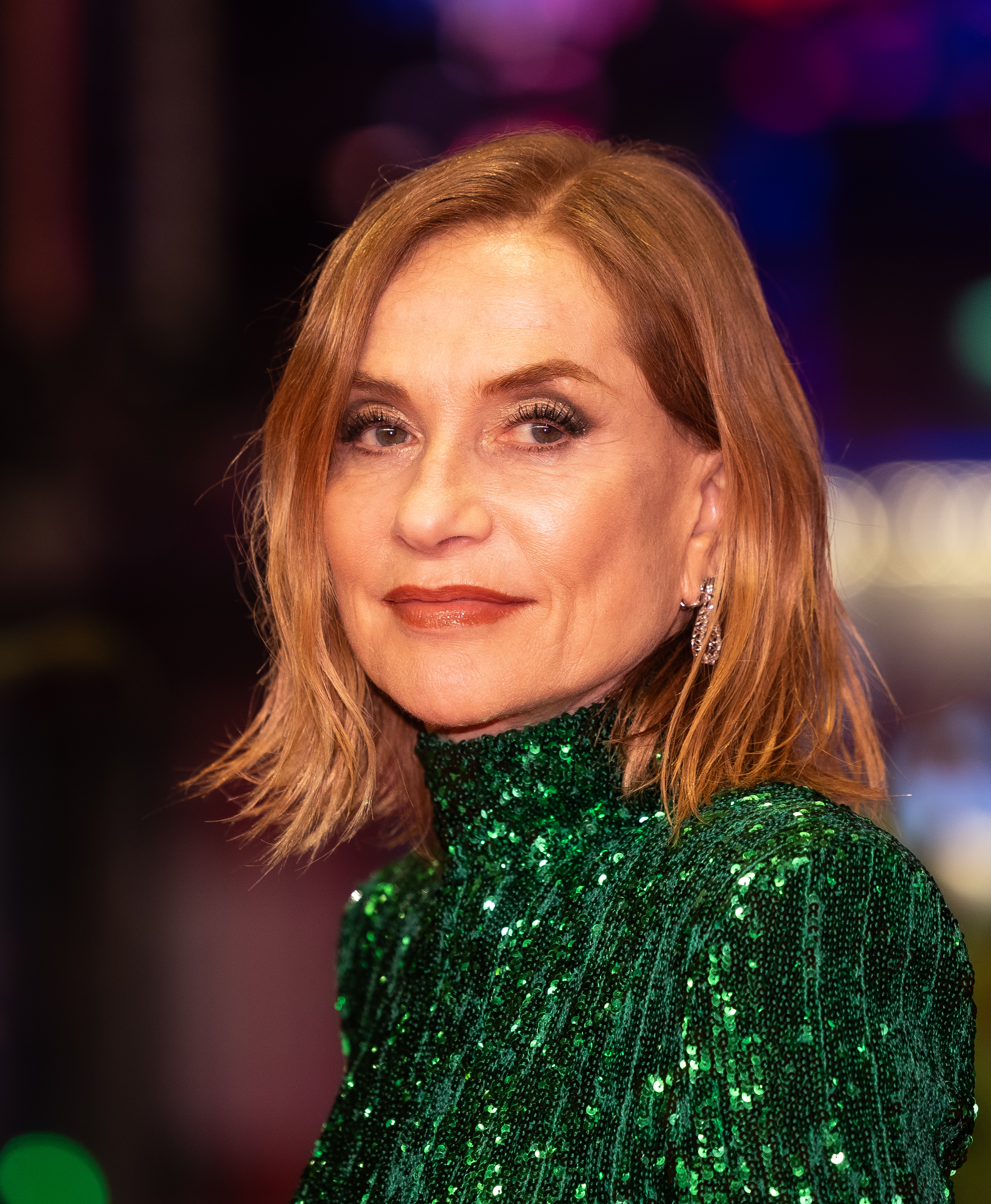
Isabelle Huppert won twice for Story of Women (1988) and La Cérémonie (1995)

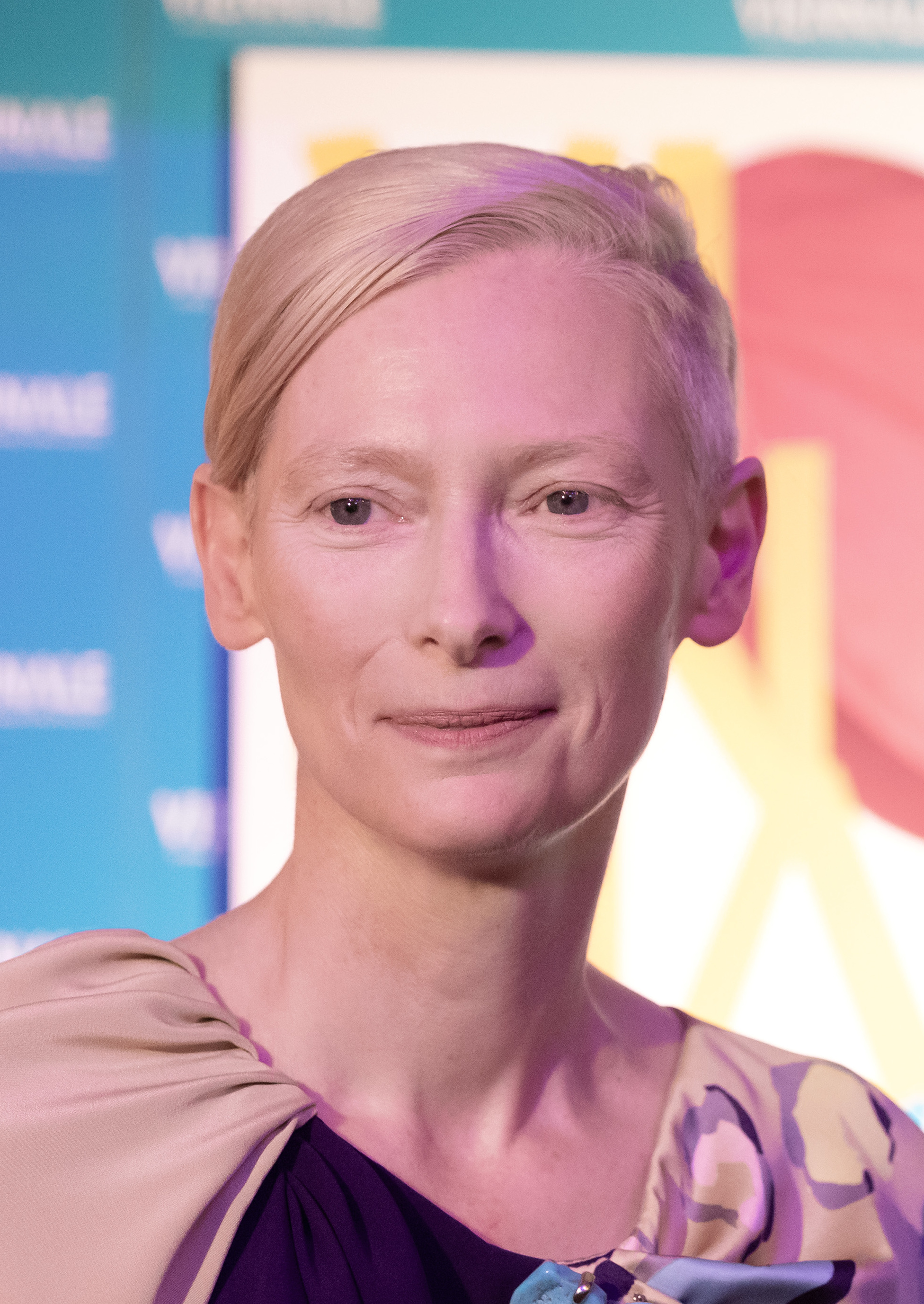
Tilda Swinton won for Edward II (1991)

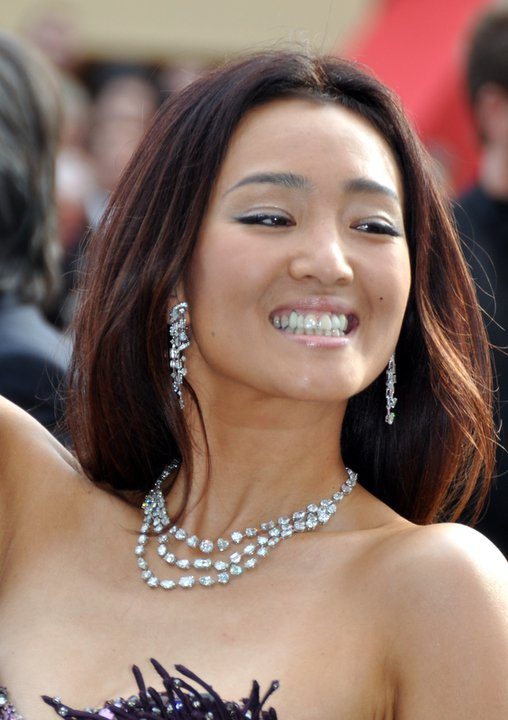
Gong Li won for The Story of Qiu Ju (1992)

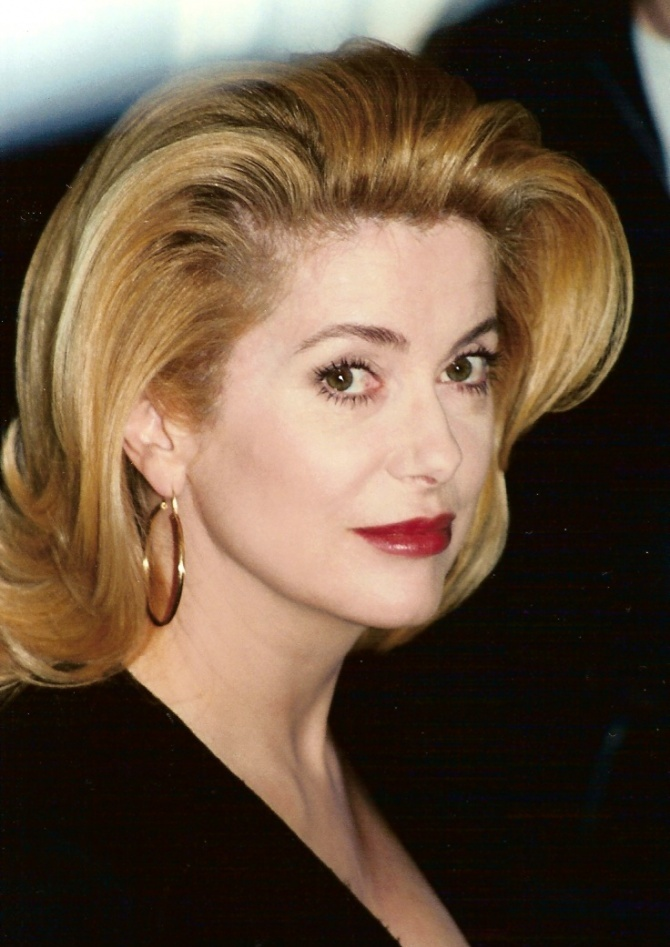
Catherine Deneuve won for Place Vendôme (1998)

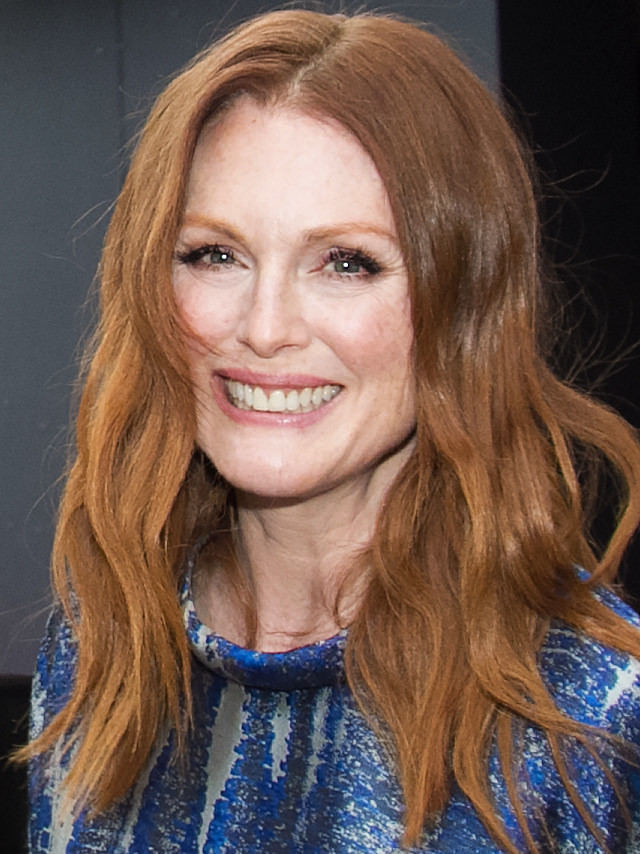
Julianne Moore won for Far from Heaven (2002)

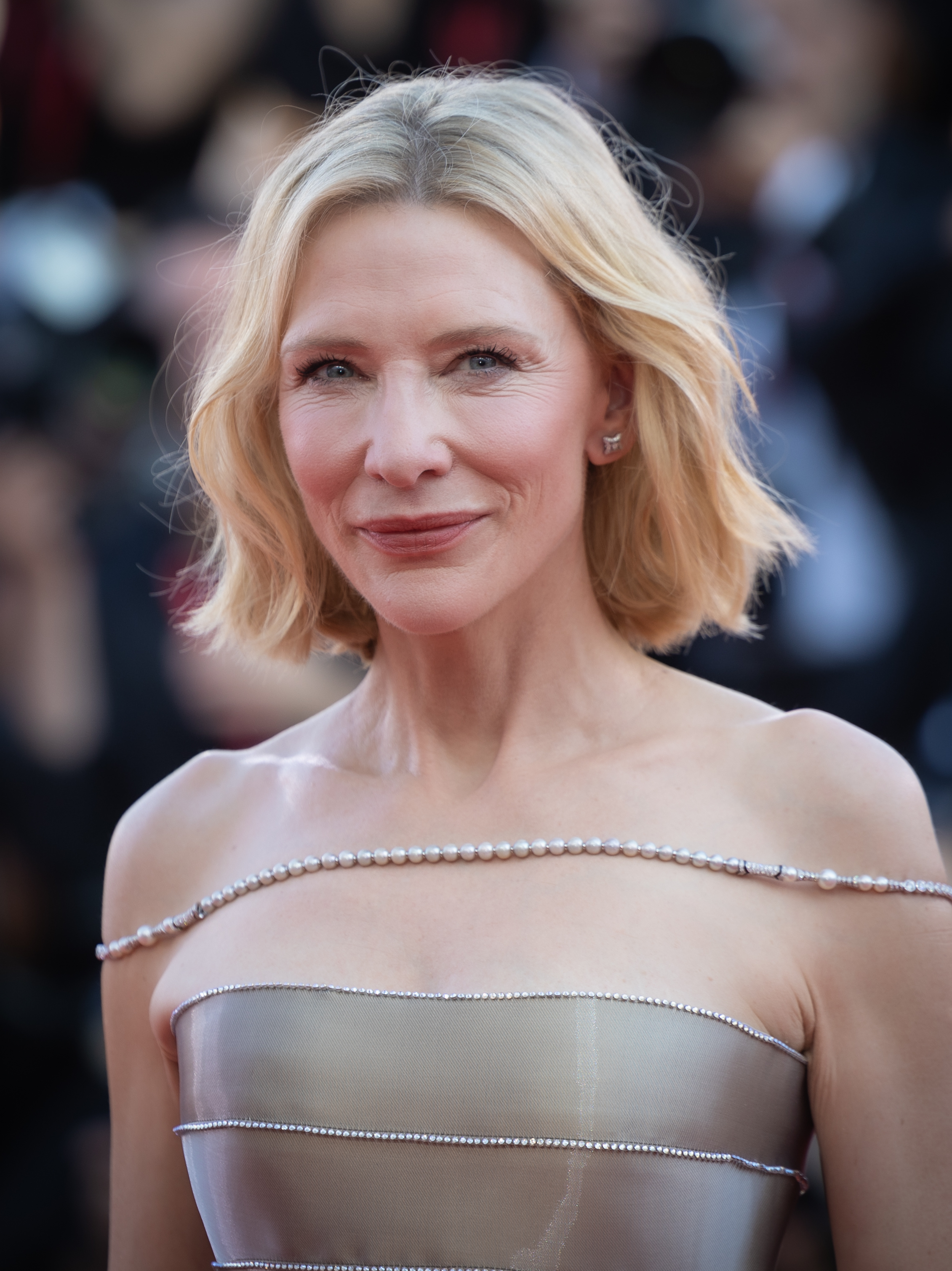
Cate Blanchett won twice for I'm Not There (2007) and Tár (2022)

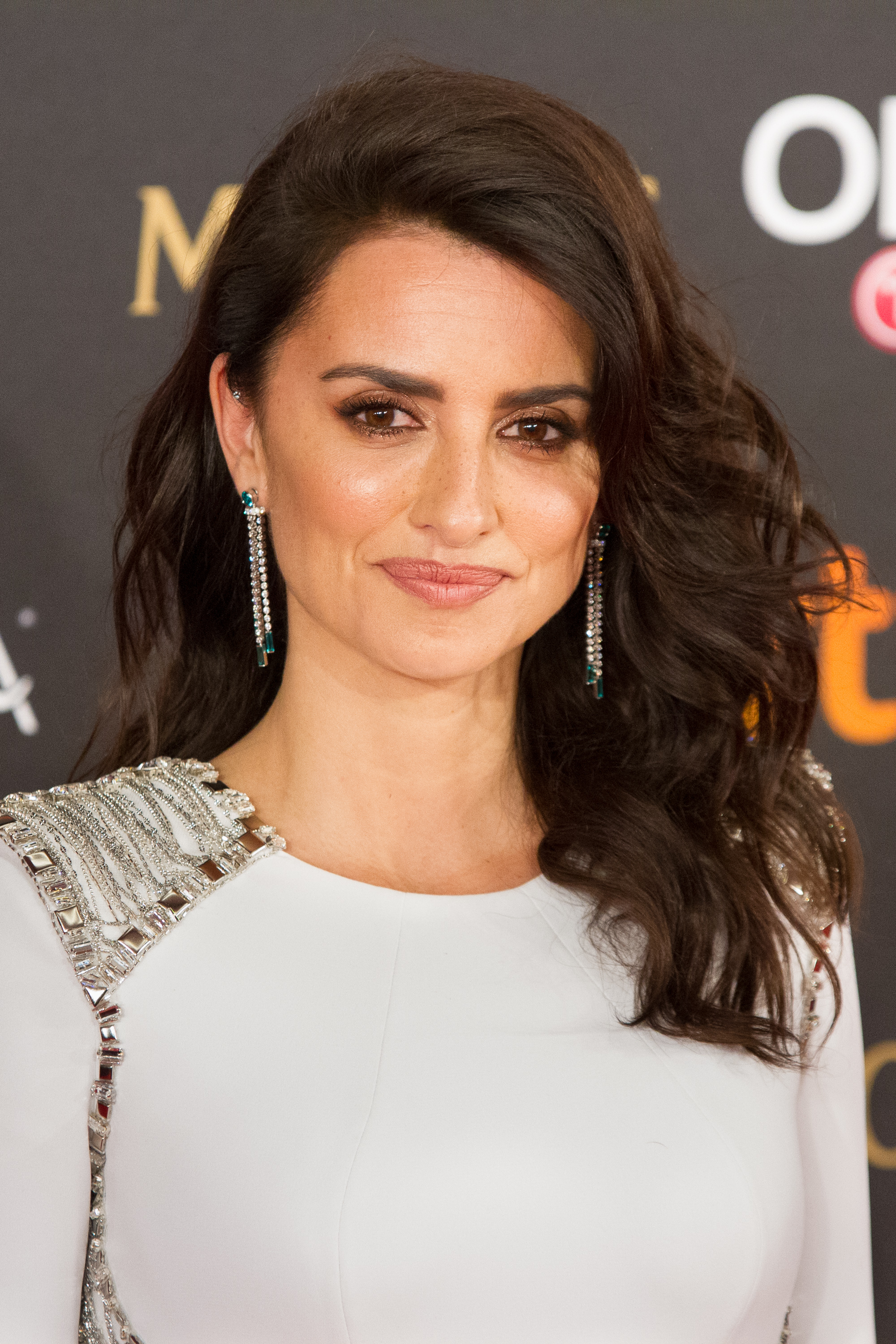
Penélope Cruz won for Parallel Mothers (2021)

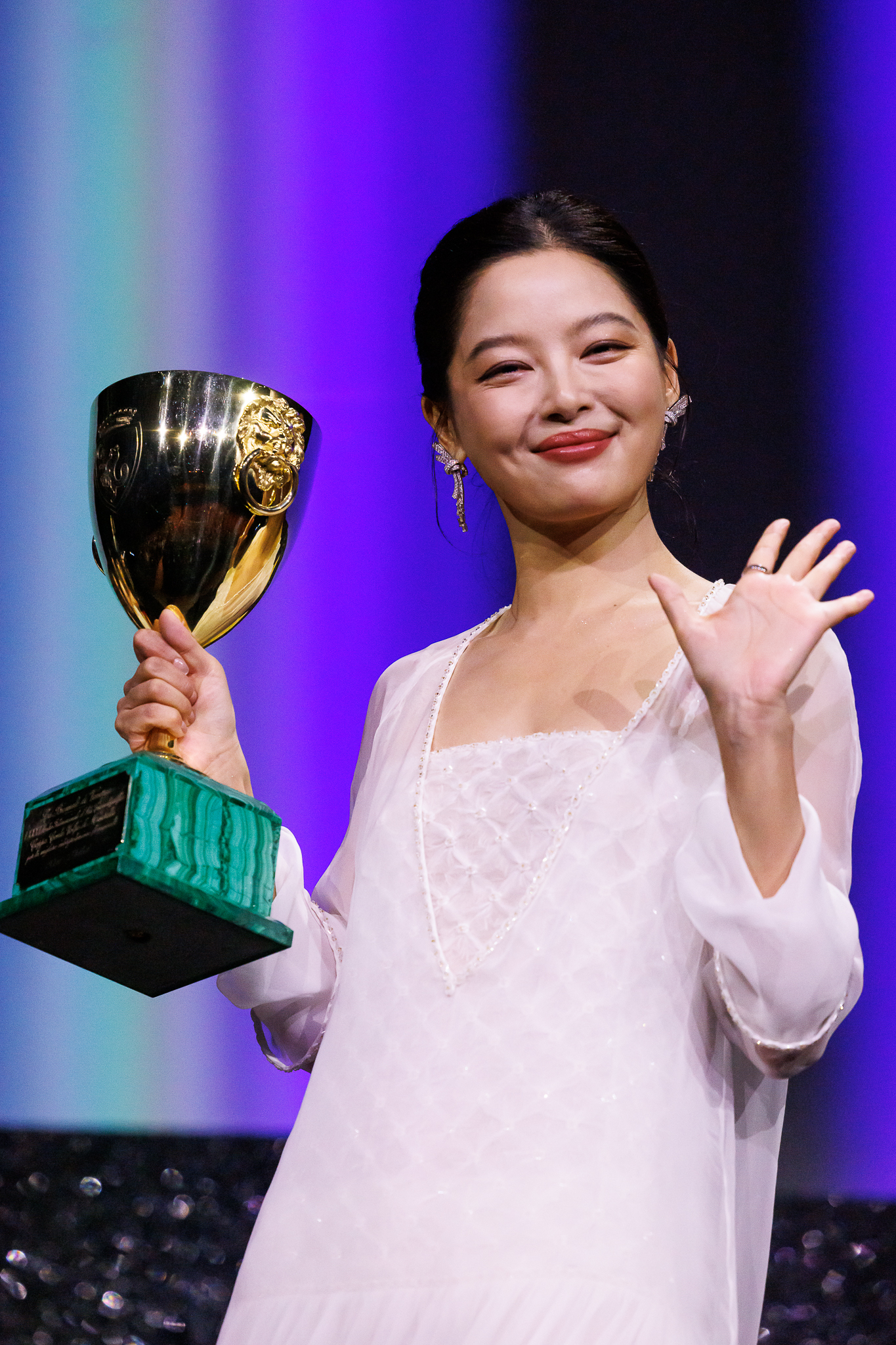
Xin Zhilei won for The Sun Rises on Us All (2025)

Table key
‡	Indicates the Best Supporting Actress winner

=== 1930s ===
Year	Actress	Role(s)	English Title	Original Title	Ref.
1932	Helen Hayes (Note: This year the award was given named Best Actress.)	Madelon Claudet	The Sin of Madelon Claudet		
1934	Katharine Hepburn (Note: This year the award was given named the Great Gold Medal of the National Fascist Association for Entertainment for the Best Actress.)	Josephine "Jo" March	Little Women		
1935	Paula Wessely	Valerie Gärtner	Episode		
1936	Annabella	Jeanne de Corlaix	Veille d'armes		
1937	Bette Davis (Note: Performer to receive a single award which honor the outstanding work in multiple different films in the same official competition slate.)	Mary Dwight Strauber	Marked Woman		
1937	Bette Davis	Louise "Fluff" Phillips	Kid Galahad		
1938	Norma Shearer	Marie Antoinette	Marie Antoinette		

=== 1940s ===
Year	Actress	Role(s)	English Title	Original Title	Ref.
1941	Luise Ullrich	Annelie Dörensen	Annelie		
1942	Kristina Söderbaum	Anna Jobst	The Golden City	Die goldene Stadt	
1947	Anna Magnani (Note: This year the award was given named International Award for the Best Actress.)	Angelina Bianchi	Angelina	L'onorevole Angelina	
1948	Jean Simmons	Ophelia	Hamlet		
1949	Olivia de Havilland	Virginia Stuart Cunningham	The Snake Pit		

=== 1950s ===
Year	Actress	Role(s)	English Title	Original Title	Ref.
1950	Eleanor Parker	Marie Allen	Caged		
1951	Vivien Leigh	Blanche DuBois	A Streetcar Named Desire		
1952	Ingrid Bergman (Note: Bergman's performance was denied by the jury because her voice was dubbed from Swedish into Italian (by Lydia Simoneschi). She was honored posthumously in 1992.)	Irene Girard	Europe '51	Europa '51	
1953	Lilli Palmer	Abby Edwards	The Four Poster		
1956	Maria Schell	Gervaise Macquart Coupeau	Gervaise		
1957	Dzidra Ritenberga	Malva	Malva	Мальва	
1958	Sophia Loren	Rose Bianco	The Black Orchid		
1959	Madeleine Robinson	Thérèse Marcoux	Web of Passion	À double tour	

=== 1960s ===
Year	Actress	Role(s)	English Title	Original Title	Ref.
1960	Shirley MacLaine	Fran Kubelik	The Apartment		
1961	Suzanne Flon	Madame Cordier	Thou Shalt Not Kill	Tu ne tueras point	
1962	Emmanuelle Riva	Thérèse Desqueyroux	Thérèse Desqueyroux		
1963	Delphine Seyrig	Hélène Aughain	Muriel	Muriel ou le Temps d'un retour	
1964	Harriet Andersson	Louise	To Love	Att Älska	
1965	Annie Girardot	Kay Larsi	Three Rooms in Manhattan	Trois chambres à Manhattan	
1966	Natalya Arinbasarova	Altynai	The First Teacher	Первый учитель	
1967	Shirley Knight	Lula	Dutchman		
1968	Laura Betti	Emilia	Teorema		

=== 1980s ===
Year	Actress	Role(s)	English Title	Original Title	Ref.
1981	Jutta Lampe	Marianne	Marianne and Juliane	Die bleierne Zeit	
1981	Barbara Sukowa	Juliane	Marianne and Juliane	Die bleierne Zeit	
1983	Darling Légitimus (Note: This year the award was given named Best Actress Award.)	M'Man-Tine	Sugar Cane Alley	La Rue Cases-Nègres	
1984	Pascale Ogier	Louise	Full Moon in Paris	Les nuits de la pleine lune	
1985	Not assigned (Note: The jury deemed the best performances to be Sandrine Bonnaire in Vagabond (Sans toit ni loi) and Jane Birkin in Dust, but decided against awarding the prize as both films won major awards. They also gave a special mention to three other actresses for their performances (Sonja Savić in Zivot je lep, Galya Novents in Mer mankutyan tangon, and Themis Bazaka in Petrina hronia).)				
1986	Valeria Golino	Bruna Assecondati	A Tale of Love	Storia d'amore	
1987	Kang Soo-yeon	Ok-nyo	The Surrogate Woman	씨받이	
1988	Isabelle Huppert	Marie Latour	Story of Women	Une affaire de femmes	
1988	Shirley MacLaine	Madame Sousatzka	Madame Sousatzka		
1989	Peggy Ashcroft	Lillian Huckle	She's Been Away		
1989	Geraldine James	Harriet Ambrose	She's Been Away		

=== 1990s ===
Year	Actress	Role(s)	English Title	Original Title	Ref.
1990	Gloria Münchmeyer	Lucrecia	The Moon in the Mirror	La luna en el espejo	
1991	Tilda Swinton	Isabella	Edward II		
1992	Gong Li	Qiu Ju	The Story of Qiu Ju	秋菊打官司	
1993	Juliette Binoche	Julie Vignon de Courcy	Three Colours: Blue	Trois couleurs: Bleu	
1993	Anna Bonaiuto ‡	Mother	Where Are You? I'm Here	Dove siete? Io sono qui	
1994	Maria de Medeiros	Maria	Two Brothers, My Sister	Três Irmãos	
1994	Vanessa Redgrave	Irina Shapira	Little Odessa		
1995	Sandrine Bonnaire	Sophie	La Cérémonie		
1995	Isabelle Huppert	Jeanne	La Cérémonie		
1995	Isabella Ferrari ‡	Andreina	The Story of a Poor Young Man	Romanzo di un giovane povero	
1996	Victoire Thivisol	Ponette	Ponette		
1997	Robin Tunney	Marcy	Niagara, Niagara		
1998	Catherine Deneuve	Marianne Malivert	Place Vendôme		
1999	Nathalie Baye	Her	Une liaison pornographique		

=== 2000s ===
Year	Actress	Role(s)	English Title	Original Title	Ref.
2000	Rose Byrne	B.G.	The Goddess of 1967		
2001	Sandra Ceccarelli	Maria	Light of My Eyes	Luce dei miei occhi	
2002	Julianne Moore	Cathy Whitaker	Far from Heaven		
2003	Katja Riemann	Lena Fischer	Rosenstrasse		
2004	Imelda Staunton	Vera Drake	Vera Drake		
2005	Giovanna Mezzogiorno	Sabina	Don't Tell	La bestia nel cuore	
2006	Helen Mirren	Queen Elizabeth II	The Queen		
2007	Cate Blanchett	Jude Quinn	I'm Not There		
2008	Dominique Blanc	Anne-Marie	The Other One	L'Autre	
2009	Kseniya Rappoport	Sonia	The Double Hour	La doppia ora	

=== 2010s ===
Year	Actress	Role(s)	English Title	Original Title	Ref.
2010	Ariane Labed	Marina	Attenberg		
2011	Deanie Ip	Sister Peach	A Simple Life	桃姐	
2012	Hadas Yaron	Shira Mendelman	Fill the Void	למלא את החלל	
2013	Elena Cotta	Samira Calafiore	A Street in Palermo	Via Castellana Bandiera	
2014	Alba Rohrwacher	Mina	Hungry Hearts		
2015	Valeria Golino	Anna	Per amor vostro		
2016	Emma Stone	Mia Dolan	La La Land		
2017	Charlotte Rampling	Hannah	Hannah		
2018	Olivia Colman	Queen Anne	The Favourite		
2019	Ariane Ascaride	Sylvie Benar	Gloria Mundi		

=== 2020s ===
Year	Actress	Role(s)	English Title	Original Title	Ref.
2020	Vanessa Kirby	Martha Weiss	Pieces of a Woman		
2021	Penélope Cruz	Janis Martínez	Parallel Mothers	Madres paralelas	
2022	Cate Blanchett	Lydia Tár	Tár		
2023	Cailee Spaeny	Priscilla Presley	Priscilla		
2024	Nicole Kidman	Romy	Babygirl		
2025	Xin Zhilei	Meiyun	The Sun Rises on Us All	日掛中天	
2026	Mathilde Arcel	Marie	Woman Unknown	Kvinde, ukendt	

== Multiple winners ==
The following individuals have received multiple Best Actress awards:

Number of Wins	Actress	Nationality	Films
2	Shirley MacLaine	United States	The Apartment (1960), Madame Sousatzka (1988)
2	Isabelle Huppert	France	Story of Women (1988), La Cérémonie (1995)
2	Valeria Golino	Italy	A Tale of Love (1986), Per amor vostro (2015)
2	Cate Blanchett	Australia	I'm Not There (2007), Tár (2022)

== See also ==
The following individuals have also received Best Actress award(s) at Cannes or Berlin Film Festival.

Winning Year at Venice	Actress	Nationality	Festival	Year	English Title
1934	Katharine Hepburn	United States	Cannes	1962	Long Day's Journey into Night
1937	Bette Davis	United States	Cannes	1951	All About Eve
1947	Anna Magnani	Italy	Berlin	1958	Wild Is the Wind
1958	Sophia Loren	Italy	Cannes	1961	Two Women
1960 1988	Shirley MacLaine	United States	Berlin	1959	Ask Any Girl
1960 1988	Shirley MacLaine	United States	Berlin	1971	Desperate Characters
1981	Barbara Sukowa	Germany	Cannes	1986	Rosa Luxemburg
1988 1995	Isabelle Huppert	France	Cannes	1978	Violette Nozière
1988 1995	Isabelle Huppert	France	Cannes	2001	The Piano Teacher
1993	Juliette Binoche	France	Berlin	1997	The English Patient
1993	Juliette Binoche	France	Cannes	2010	Certified Copy
1994	Vanessa Redgrave ‡	England	Cannes	1966	Morgan – A Suitable Case for Treatment
1994	Vanessa Redgrave ‡	England	Cannes	1969	Isadora
2000	Rose Byrne	Australia	Berlin	2025	If I Had Legs I'd Kick You
2002	Julianne Moore	United States	Berlin	2003	The Hours
2002	Julianne Moore	United States	Cannes	2014	Maps to the Stars
2006	Helen Mirren	England	Cannes	1984	Cal
2006	Helen Mirren	England	Cannes	1995	The Madness of King George
2017	Charlotte Rampling	England	Berlin	2015	45 Years
2021	Penélope Cruz	Spain	Cannes	2006	Volver
2024	Nicole Kidman	Australia	Berlin	2003	The Hours
