= God Needs Men =

1950 film

- Film poster
- Directed by: Jean Delannoy
- Written by: Jean Aurenche; Pierre Bost
- Based on: Un recteur de l'Île de Sein by Henri Queffelec
- Produced by: Paul Graetz
- Starring: Pierre Fresnay; Madeleine Robinson; Daniel Gélin
- Cinematography: Robert Lefebvre
- Edited by: James Cuenet
- Music by: René Cloërec
- Production company: Transcontinental Films
- Distributed by: Twentieth Century Fox
- Release date: 4 October 1950
- Running time: 100 minutes
- Country: France
- Language: French

God Needs Men (French: Dieu a besoin des hommes) is a 1950 French historical drama film directed by Jean Delannoy and starring Pierre Fresnay, Madeleine Robinson and Daniel Gélin. The film is based on a 1944 novel Un recteur de l'Île de Sein by Henri Queffelec. It was shot at the Billancourt Studios in Paris. Initial location shooting took place on the Île de Sein off Finistère in Brittany, but the majority of the film was staged on mainland Brittany. The film's sets were designed by the art director René Renoux.

God Needs Men was originally due to be the French entry at the 1950 Venice Film Festival but it was withdrawn due to fears that its subject might offend the Catholic Church. However, due to its popularity, including among Catholics, it was accepted for screening at the Festival anyway. At the 1951 Berlin Film Festival it won the Special Prize for an Excellent Film Achievement.

== Plot ==
On a rugged, poverty-stricken island off the coast of Brittany many of the inhabitants spend their time as wreckers preying on shipwrecks. Their wildness forces the parish priest to take refuge on the mainland. A fisherman steps forward to take his place and tries to uphold religion on the island.

== Locations ==
With the exception of the prologue, the exterior scenes were shot in Plouguerneau and not on the island of Sein, due to the local inhabitants' distrust. As noted by actor Pierre Fresnay, most filming was done on a set for the island village built in Pantin, a northeastern suburb of Paris.

== Cast ==
- Pierre Fresnay as Thomas Gourvennec
- Madeleine Robinson as Jeanne Gourvennec
- Daniel Gélin as Joseph le Berre
- Antoine Balpêtré as Le père Gourvennec, un pêcheur
- Germaine Kerjean as Mme Kerneis
- Sylvie as Coise Karbacen
- Jean d'Yd as Corentin Gourvennec
- Daniel Ivernel as François Guillen
- Raphaël Patorni as Jules
- Lucienne Bogaert as Anaïs Le Berre
- Marcel Delaître as M. Kerneis
- Fernand René as Yves Lannuzel
- Charles Bouillaud as Le gendarme
- René Génin as Le père d'Yvon
- Jean Brochard as L'abbé Kerhervé, le recteur de Lescoff
- Jean Carmet as Yvon
- Andrée Clément as Scholastique Kerneis
- Marcelle Géniat as La mère Gourvennec
- Jérôme Goulven as Le brigadier
- Cécyl Marcyl as La vieille
- Albert Michel as Le Bail
- Jean-Pierre Mocky as Pierre
- Pierre Moncorbier as Un pêcheur

== Bibliography ==
- Johnson, William Bruce. Miracles & Sacrilege: Roberto Rossellini, the Church and Film Censorship in Hollywood. University of Toronto Press, 2008.
