= General Della Rovere =

1959 Italian film

General della Rovere
- Directed by: Roberto Rossellini
- Written by: Sergio Amidei; Diego Fabbri; Indro Montanelli
- Produced by: Moris Ergas
- Starring: Vittorio De Sica; Hannes Messemer
- Cinematography: Carlo Carlini
- Edited by: Cesare Cavagna
- Music by: Renzo Rossellini
- Production companies: Zebra Film; Société Nouvelle des Etablissements Gaumont
- Distributed by: Cineriz (Italy); Gaumont Distribution (France)
- Release dates: 31 August 1959 (Venice International Film Festival); 7 October 1959 (Italy)
- Running time: 137 minutes (premiere); 132 minutes (theatrical)
- Countries: Italy; France
- Languages: Italian; German; Hebrew

General Della Rovere (Italian: Il generale Della Rovere) is a 1959 Italian–French drama film directed by Roberto Rossellini. The film is based on a story by Indro Montanelli which was in turn based on a true story.

== Plot ==
Genoa, 1944, during the era of the Italian Social Republic. Petty thief Emanuele Bardone is hired by the German occupation forces to impersonate an Italian Resistance leader, General Della Rovere, and infiltrate a group of resistance prisoners in a Milan prison. Gradually, Bardone loses himself in his role and not merely pretends to be a hero of the resistance but actually becomes one, first encouraging his fellow prisoners to show courage and eventually accepting death by firing squad rather than betraying another imprisoned resistance leader.

== Cast ==
- Vittorio De Sica: Emanuele Bardone/Grimaldi
- Hannes Messemer: SS Colonel Müller
- Vittorio Caprioli: Aristide Banchelli
- Sandra Milo: Olga
- Giovanna Ralli: Valeria
- Maria Greco: Madama Vera
- Herbert Fischer: German sergeant
- Anne Vernon: Clara Fassio
- Franco Interlenghi: Antonio Pasquali
- Ivo Garrani: Partisan Chief
- Linda Veras: German Attendant

== Cultural influences ==
The transformation of Emmanuele Bardone, the film's protagonist, from an Axis collaborator into a hero of the anti-Nazi resistance, has been compared by Spanish political commentators to the life story of Adolfo Suárez, the Spanish prime minister who oversaw the transition to democracy in the late 1970s. In particular, Javier Cercas devotes the last chapter of The Anatomy of a Moment to exploring the parallels between Bardone and Suarez.

== Awards ==
- Golden Lion at the 1959 Venice International Film Festival
