= Victoire Thivisol =

French film actress (born 1991)

- Born: 6 July 1991 (age 35)
- Occupation: Actress
- Years active: 1996–present

Victoire Thivisol (born 6 July 1991) is a French film actress.

She first gained acclaim at the age of four in the role of a child coping with her mother's death in Ponette, becoming the youngest actress to win the Volpi Cup for Best Actress at the Venice Film Festival. She later went on to star in Children of the Century and Chocolat (2000), both as the daughter of Juliette Binoche. In 2007, she was cast in Les grands s'allongent par terre (2008). The director, Emmanuel Saget, was so impressed with her that he rewrote the film around her character.

== Filmography ==
Film and television
| Year | Title | Role | Notes |
|---|---|---|---|
| 1996 | Ponette | Ponette | Volpi Cup for Best Actress; Young Artist Award for Best Young Performer in a Foreign Film; Online Film & Television Association Award for Best Breakthrough Performance – Female |
| 1999 | The Children of the Century | Solange | |
| 2000 | Chocolat | Anouk Rocher | |
| 2005 | Le bal des célibataires | Jeanne | Television film |
| 2008 | Grown-Ups Lie Down on the Ground | Gena | |
