= Marie Majerová =

Czech writer and translator (1882–1967)

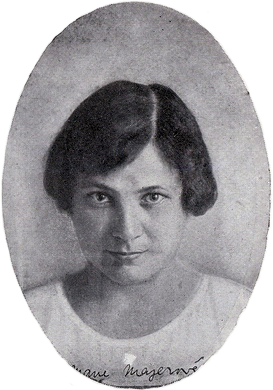
- Born: Marie Bartošová; 1 February 1882; Úvaly, Kingdom of Bohemia, Austria-Hungary
- Died: 16 January 1967 (aged 84); Prague, Czechoslovakia
- Writing career
- Genres: short story, novel

Marie Majerová (1 February 1882 – 16 January 1967) was a Czech writer and translator.

== Biography ==
The daughter of working-class parents, she was born in Úvaly and grew up in Kladno. When she was sixteen, she began working as a servant in Budapest. She went on to complete her education in Prague, Paris and Vienna. She was a member of the Czechoslovak Communist Party from its inception and was also involved in the feminist movement.

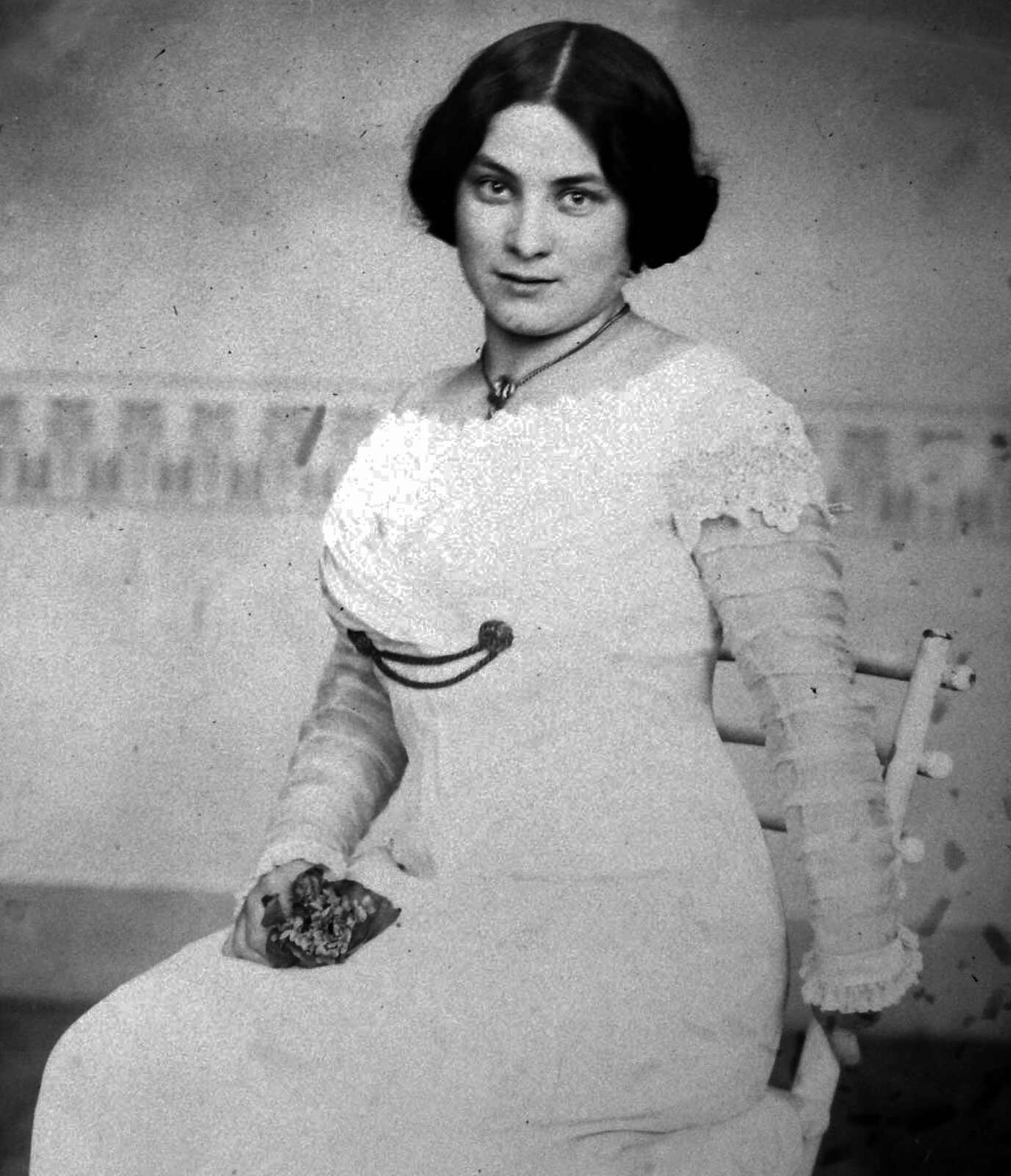
Marie Majerová in 1914

In 1907, she published a collection of stories Povídky z pekla a jiné (Stories from Hell and other stories) and a novel Panenství (Maidenhood). Her writing concerns itself with the oppression of the working class and of women. She also wrote literature for children.

Majerová was married twice: first to the journalist Josef Stivín and then to the graphic artist Slavoboj Tusar.

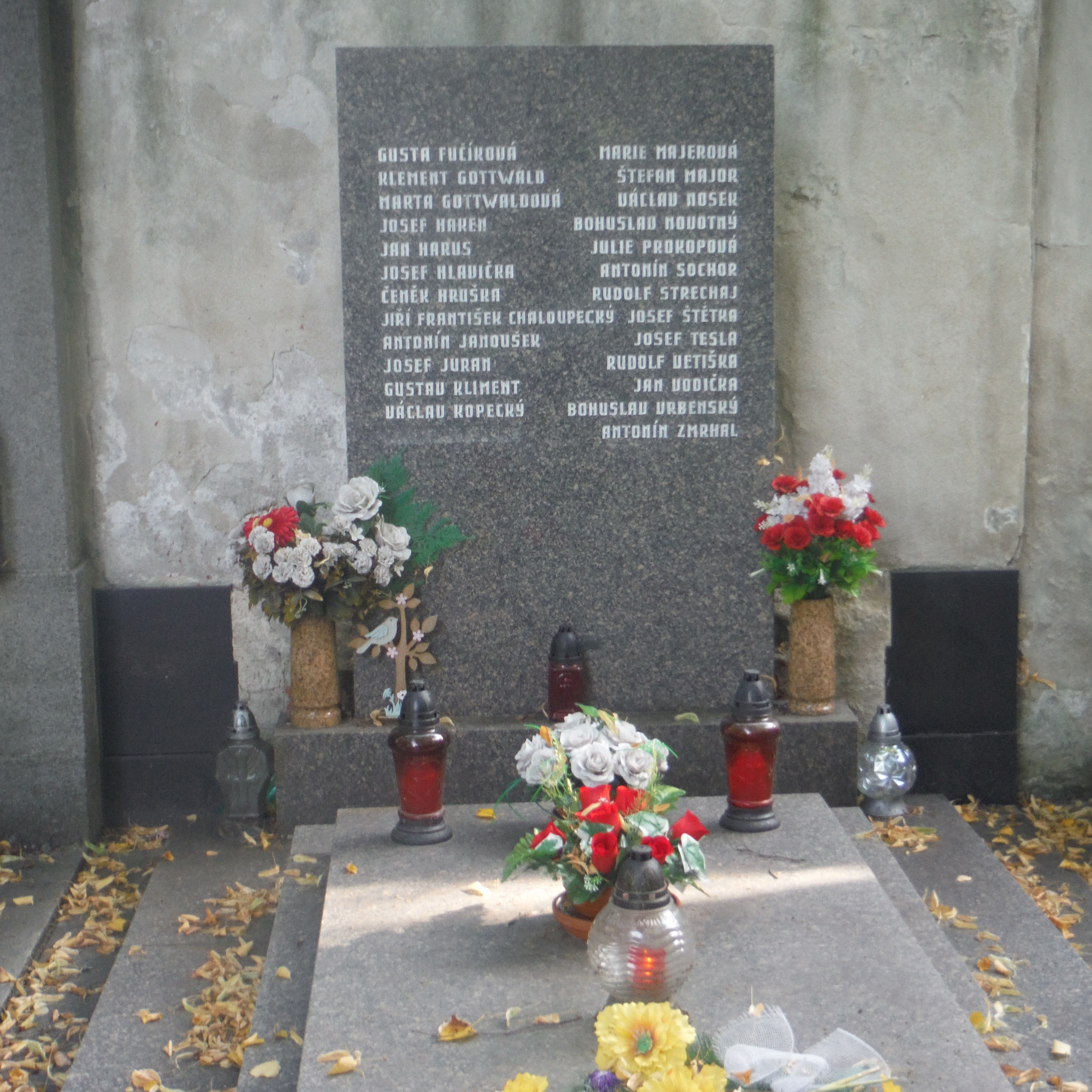
Olšany Cemetery, grave of Czech Communist politicians whose urns had originally been kept at the National Monument at Vítkov

She died in Prague at the age of 84. After cremation, her remains were buried at the Jan Žižka National Monument at Vítkov. In 1990, her ashes were moved to Olšany Cemetery, together with those of about 20 other communist leaders which had also originally been placed in the Jan Žižka National Monument.

== Works ==
The 1937 film Virginity, directed by Otakar Vávra, was based on her novel Panenství. Her novel Siréna was the basis for the screenplay for the 1947 film of the same name with English title The Strike, directed by Karel Steklý. The 1947 film received a Golden Lion at the Venice Film Festival.

Czech-Canadian author Josef Škvorecký has said that his character Marie Burdychova in The Miracle Game was physically based on Marie Majerová.

== Selected works ==
- Náměstí republiky (Republic Square). novel (1914)
- Nejkrásnější svět (The Most Beautiful of Worlds), novel (1920)
- Mučenky (Passionflowers), short stories (1924)
- Přehrada (The Dam), novel (1932)
- Siréna (The Siren), novel (1935), translated in 1953
- Havířská balada (Ballad of a Miner) (1938)
- Spisy, collected works in 19 volumes (1962)
