= 10th Venice International Film Festival =

Italian film festival in 1949

- Festival poster
- Location: Venice, Italy
- Founded: 1932
- Awards: Golden Lion of Saint Mark: Manon
- Festival date: 11 August – 1 September 1949
- Website: Website

Venice Film Festival chronology
- 11th 9th

The 10th annual Venice International Film Festival was held from 11 August to 1 September 1949. The Venice Film Festival came back permanently to the Palazzo del Cinema on the Venice Lido.

The award for the Best Film in competition was renamed to Golden Lion of Saint Mark (an allusion to the Lion of Saint Mark, which is one of the best known symbols of the ancient Republic of Venice). Manon, directed by Henri-Georges Clouzot was awarded with the Golden Lion.

== Jury ==
- Mario Gromo, Italian writer and film critic - Jury President
- Ermanno Contini
- Emilio Lavagnino
- Giannino Marescalchi
- Aldo Palazzeschi
- Piero Regnoli
- Gian Luigi Rondi, Italian screenwriter
- Gino Visentini
- Cesare Zavattini, Italian screenwriter

== Official Sections ==
=== Main Competition ===
| English title | Original title | Director(s) | Production country |
|---|---|---|---|
| The Berliner | Berliner Ballade | Robert A. Stemmle | West Germany |
| The Big Day | Jour de fête | Jacques Tati | France |
| The Blue Lagoon | | Frank Launder | United Kingdom |
| Champion | | Mark Robson | United States |
| The Elusive Pimpernel | | Michael Powell; Emeric Pressburger | United Kingdom |
| Eva | | Gustaf Molander | Sweden |
| The Fool and the Princess | | William C. Hammond | United Kingdom |
| The Forgotten Village | | Alexandr Hackenschmied | United States |
| Heaven Over the Marshes | Cielo sulla palude | Augusto Genina | Italy |
| Johnny Belinda | | Jean Negulesco | United States |
| Kind Hearts and Coronets | | Robert Hamer | United Kingdom |
| The Last Days of Dolwyn | | Emlyn Williams | United Kingdom |
| Look for the Silver Lining | | David Butler | United States |
| Manon | | Henri-Georges Clouzot | France |
| Portrait of Jennie | | William Dieterle | United States |
| The Quiet One | | Sidney Meyers | United States |
| The Sinners | Au royaume des cieux | Julien Duvivier | France |
| The Snake Pit | | Anatole Litvak | United States |
| The Three Caballeros | | Walt Disney; Norman Ferguson | United States |
| To the Eyes of Memory | Aux yeux du souvenir | Jean Delannoy | France |
| The Unloved Woman | La malquerida | Emilio Fernández | Mexico |

== Official Awards ==
=== Main Competition ===
- Golden Lion of Saint Mark: Manon by Henri-Georges Clouzot
- Best Italian Film: Heaven Over the Marshes by Augusto Genina
- Volpi Cup for Best Actor: Joseph Cotten for Portrait of Jennie
- Volpi Cup for Best Actress: Olivia de Havilland for The Snake Pit
- Best Director: Augusto Genina for Heaven Over the Marshes
- Best Original Screenplay: Jacques Tati for Jour de fête
- Best Cinematography: Gabriel Figueroa for The Unloved Woman
- Best Production Design: William Kellner for Kind Hearts and Coronets

== Independent Awards ==
=== International Award ===
- The Berliner by Robert A. Stemmle
- The Quiet One by Sidney Meyers
- The Snake Pit by Anatole Litvak

=== OICI Award ===
- Heaven Over the Marshes by Augusto Genina
