= List of awards and nominations received by Burt Reynolds =

Burt Reynolds awards and nominations
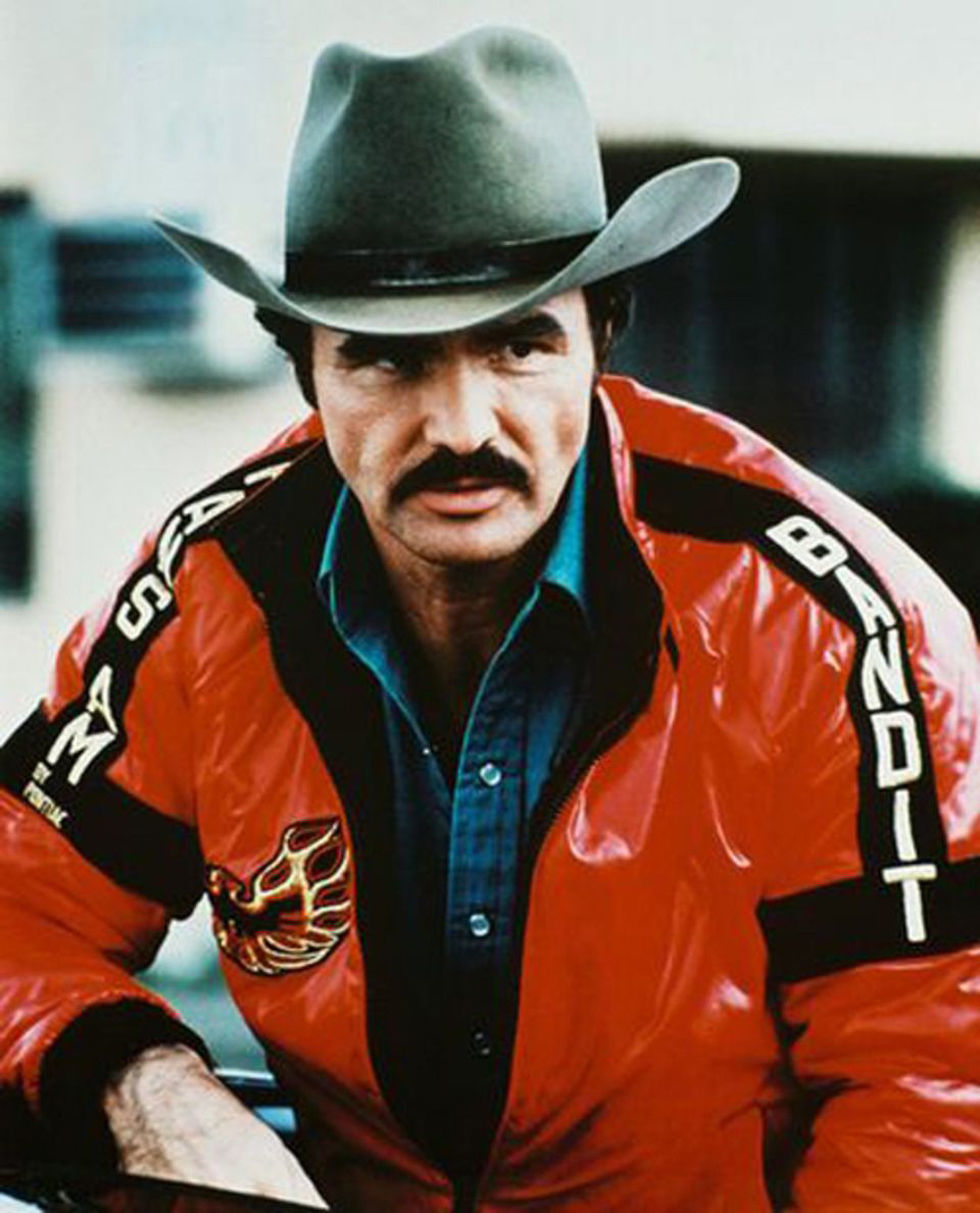
- Reynolds in 1980 wearing the Bandit jacket used in Smokey and the Bandit II
Awards and nominations
Award	Wins	Nominations
Academy Awards	0	1
Golden Globes	2	7
Emmy Awards	1	2
BAFTA Awards	0	1
SAG Awards	0	2
People's Choice Awards	9	9
Satellite Awards	1	1

Totals (Note: Certain award groups do not simply award one winner. They acknowledge several different recipients, have runners-up, and have third place. Since this is a specific recognition and is different from losing an award, runner-up mentions are considered wins in this award tally. For simplification and to avoid errors, each award in this list has been presumed to have had a prior nomination.)
- Wins: 36
- Nominations: 34

== Awards and nominations ==
This list includes the awards and nominations of actor Burt Reynolds.

Awards and nominations for acting
Year	Association	Category	Nominated work	Result	Ref.
1971	Golden Globe Awards	Best Actor – Television Series Drama	Dan August	Nominated	
1975	Golden Globe Awards	Best Actor – Motion Picture Musical or Comedy	The Longest Yard	Nominated	
1980	Golden Globe Awards	Best Actor – Motion Picture Musical or Comedy	Starting Over	Nominated	
1991	Primetime Emmy Awards	Outstanding Lead Actor in a Comedy Series	Evening Shade	Won	
1991	Golden Globe Awards	Best Actor – Television Series Musical or Comedy	Evening Shade	Nominated	
1992	Golden Globe Awards	Best Actor – Television Series Musical or Comedy	Evening Shade	Won	
1992	Primetime Emmy Awards	Outstanding Lead Actor in a Comedy Series	Evening Shade	Nominated	
1993	Golden Globe Awards	Best Actor – Television Series Musical or Comedy	Evening Shade	Nominated	
1997	Boston Society of Film Critics	Best Supporting Actor	Boogie Nights	2nd place	
1997	Los Angeles Film Critics Association	Best Supporting Actor	Boogie Nights	Won	
1997	New York Film Critics Circle	Best Supporting Actor	Boogie Nights	Won	
1997	Online Film Critics Society	Best Supporting Actor	Boogie Nights	Won	
1998	Academy Awards	Best Supporting Actor	Boogie Nights	Nominated	
1998	Golden Globe Awards	Best Supporting Actor – Motion Picture	Boogie Nights	Won	
1998	British Academy Film Awards	Best Actor in a Supporting Role	Boogie Nights	Nominated	
1998	Chicago Film Critics Association	Best Supporting Actor	Boogie Nights	Won	
1998	Florida Film Critics Circle	Best Cast	Boogie Nights	Won	
1998	National Society of Film Critics	Best Supporting Actor	Boogie Nights	Won	
1998	Satellite Awards	Best Supporting Actor – Motion Picture	Boogie Nights	Won	
1998	Satellite Awards	Best Performance by an Ensemble Cast in a Motion Picture	Boogie Nights	Won	
1998	Screen Actors Guild	Outstanding Performance by a Male Actor in a Supporting Role	Boogie Nights	Nominated	
1998	Screen Actors Guild	Outstanding Performance by a Cast in a Motion Picture	Boogie Nights	Nominated	

=== Other honors ===
- 1978: Star on the Hollywood Walk of Fame at 6838 Hollywood Blvd.
- 2003: Atlanta IMAGE Film and Video Award
