= Golden Lion =

Highest prize of the Venice Film Festival

- Leone d'oro (Italian)
- 2026 recipient: May el-Toukhy
- Location: Venice
- Country: Italy
- Presented by: Venice Film Festival
- Formerly called: Golden Lion of Saint Mark (1949–1953)
- First award: 1949
- Currently held by: Woman Unknown by May el-Toukhy (2026)
- Website: labiennale.org/cinema
- The Golden Lion trophy

The Golden Lion (Italian: Leone d'oro) is the highest prize given to a film at the Venice Film Festival. The prize was introduced in 1949 by the organizing committee, as the successor to the earlier Gran Premio Internazionale di Venezia (Grand International Prize of Venice), awarded in 1947 and 1948. The prize was introduced as the Golden Lion of Saint Mark, which was one of the best known symbols of the ancient Republic of Venice. In 1954, the prize was permanently named the Golden Lion.

The Golden Lion is widely regarded as one of the film industry's most prestigious and distinguished prizes. In 1971, the Golden Lion for Lifetime Achievement was introduced, an honorary prize for people who have made an important contribution to cinema.

== History ==
=== Background ===
From 1934 until 1942, the highest award of the festival was the Coppa Mussolini for Best Italian Film and Best Foreign Film. Even though other awards were attributed to Nazi propaganda films, such as Jud Süß (Suss, the Jew), an antisemitic production made at the behest of Nazi Propaganda Minister Joseph Goebbels, won the festival's Golden Crown award in 1940.

After the end of the WWII during the reestablishment of the festival, The Southerner, directed by Jean Renoir, won the main prize at the 1946 edition. In 1947 and 1948, the equivalent prize for the Golden Lion was the Gran Premio Internazionale di Venezia (Grand International Prize of Venice), awarded to Karel Steklý's The Strike in 1947 and Laurence Olivier's Hamlet in 1948.

=== Golden Lions ===
The first Golden Lion was awarded in 1949. Previously, the equivalent prize was the Gran Premio Internazionale di Venezia (Grand International Prize of Venice), awarded in 1947 and 1948. The prize was introduced in 1949 as the Golden Golden Lion of Saint Mark, which was one of the best known symbols of the ancient Republic of Venice.

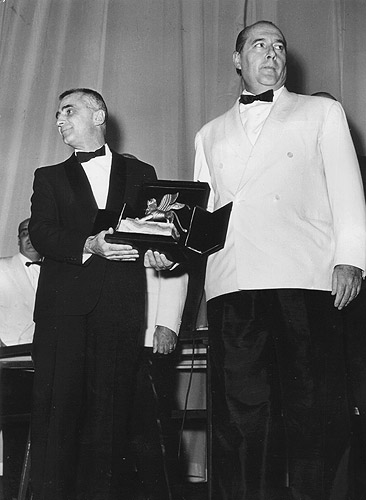
Roberto Rossellini and Mario Monicelli winning the Golden Lion in 1959 for General Della Rovere and The Great War, respectively

No Golden Lions were awarded between 1969 and 1979. According to the Biennale's official website, the hiatus was a result of the 1968 Lion being given to the radically experimental Die Artisten in der Zirkuskuppel: Ratlos; the website says that the awards "still had a statute dating back to the fascist era and could not side-step the general political climate. Sixty-eight produced a dramatic fracture with the past".

More French films have been awarded the Golden Lion, more than to any other nation. However, there is considerable geographical diversity in the winners. American recipients include John Cassavetes and Robert Altman (tied), Ang Lee (Brokeback Mountain was the first winning U.S. film not to tie), Darren Aronofsky, Sofia Coppola, Todd Phillips, Chloé Zhao, Laura Poitras, and Jim Jarmusch. Prior to 1980, only three of 21 winners were of non-European origin. Since the 1980s, the Golden Lion has been presented to a number of Asian filmmakers, particularly in comparison to the Cannes Film Festival's top prize, the Palme d'Or.

Ang Lee won the Golden Lion twice within three years in the 2000s, once for an American film and once for a Chinese-language film. Zhang Yimou has also won twice. Other Asians to win the Golden Lion since 1980 include Jia Zhangke, Hou Hsiao-hsien, Tsai Ming-liang, Trần Anh Hùng, Takeshi Kitano, Kim Ki-duk, Jafar Panahi, Mira Nair, and Lav Diaz. Russian filmmakers have won the Golden Lion several times, including since the end of the USSR.

To date, 33 of the 54 winners have been European men, including Soviet/Russian winners. Since 1949, eight women have won the Golden Lion for directing: Margarethe von Trotta, Agnès Varda, Mira Nair, Sofia Coppola, Chloé Zhao, Audrey Diwan, Laura Poitras, and May el-Toukhy. In 1938, German director Leni Riefenstahl won the Festival when its highest award was the Coppa Mussolini. In 2019, Joker became the first movie based on original comic book characters to win the prize.

From 2026, the non-English language winners will also be automatically eligible for the Academy Award for Best International Feature Film.

The prize is the highest prize given to a film at the Venice Film Festival, and is widely regarded as one of the film industry's most prestigious and distinguished prizes.

== Winners ==
These films received the Golden Lions or the major awards of the Venice Film Festival:

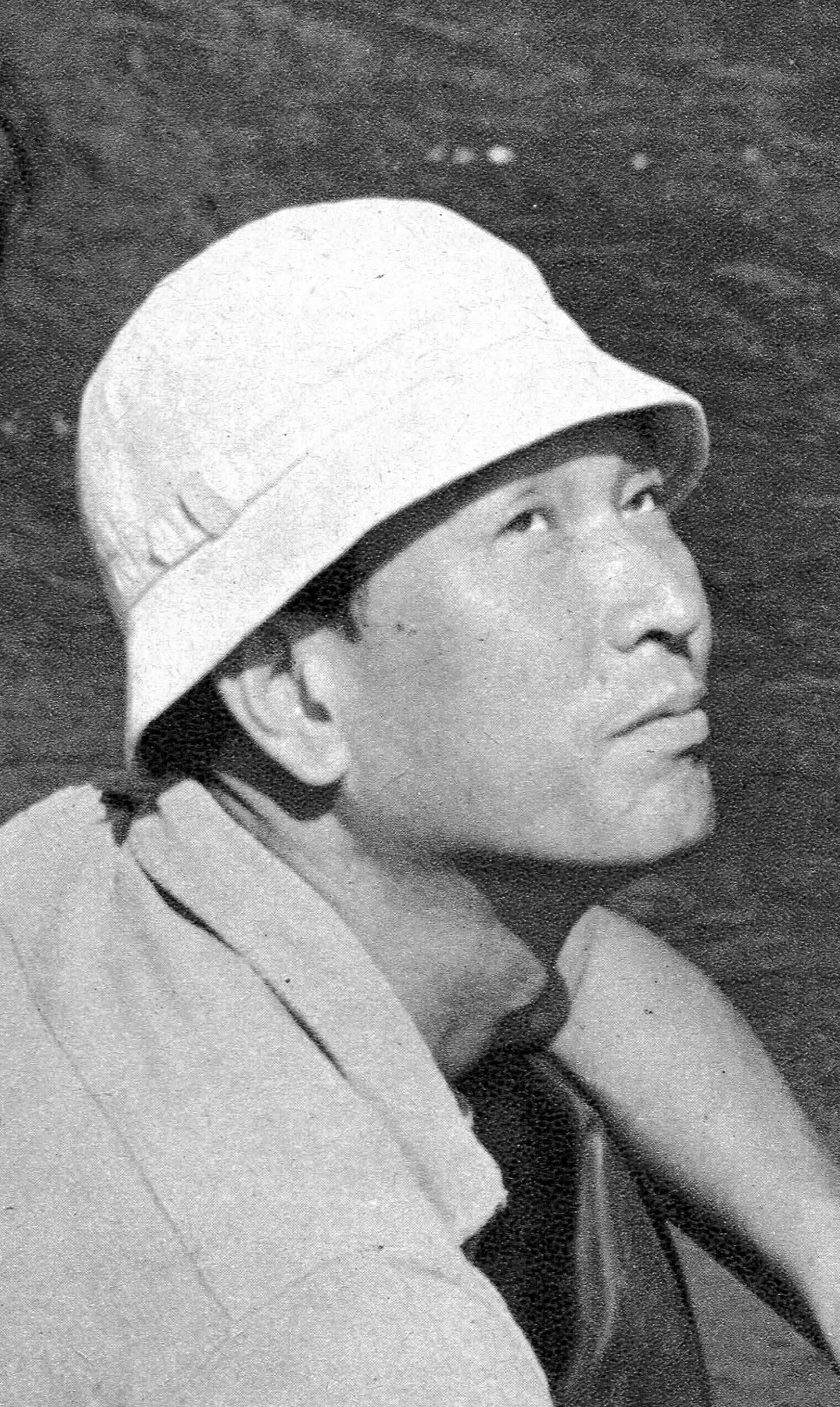
Akira Kurosawa won for Rashomon (1950)

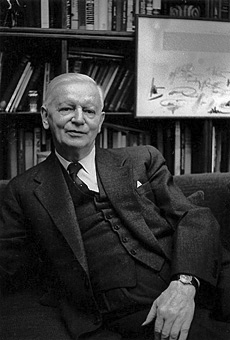
Carl Theodor Dreyer won for Ordet (1955)

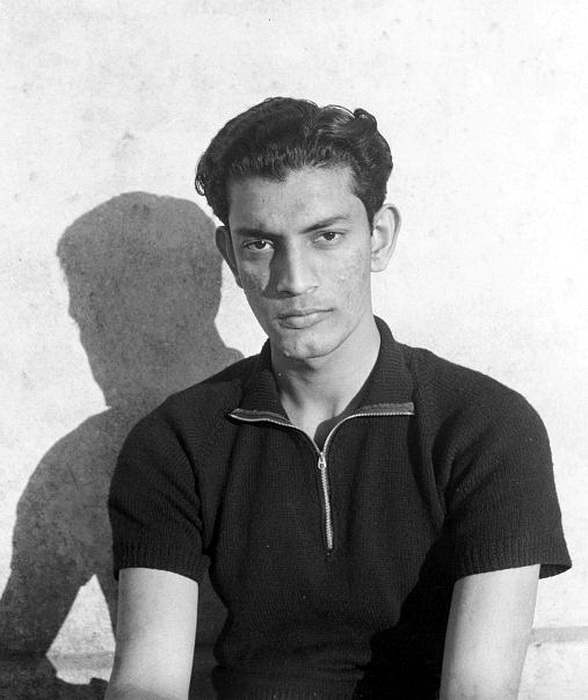
Satyajit Ray won for Aparajito (1957)

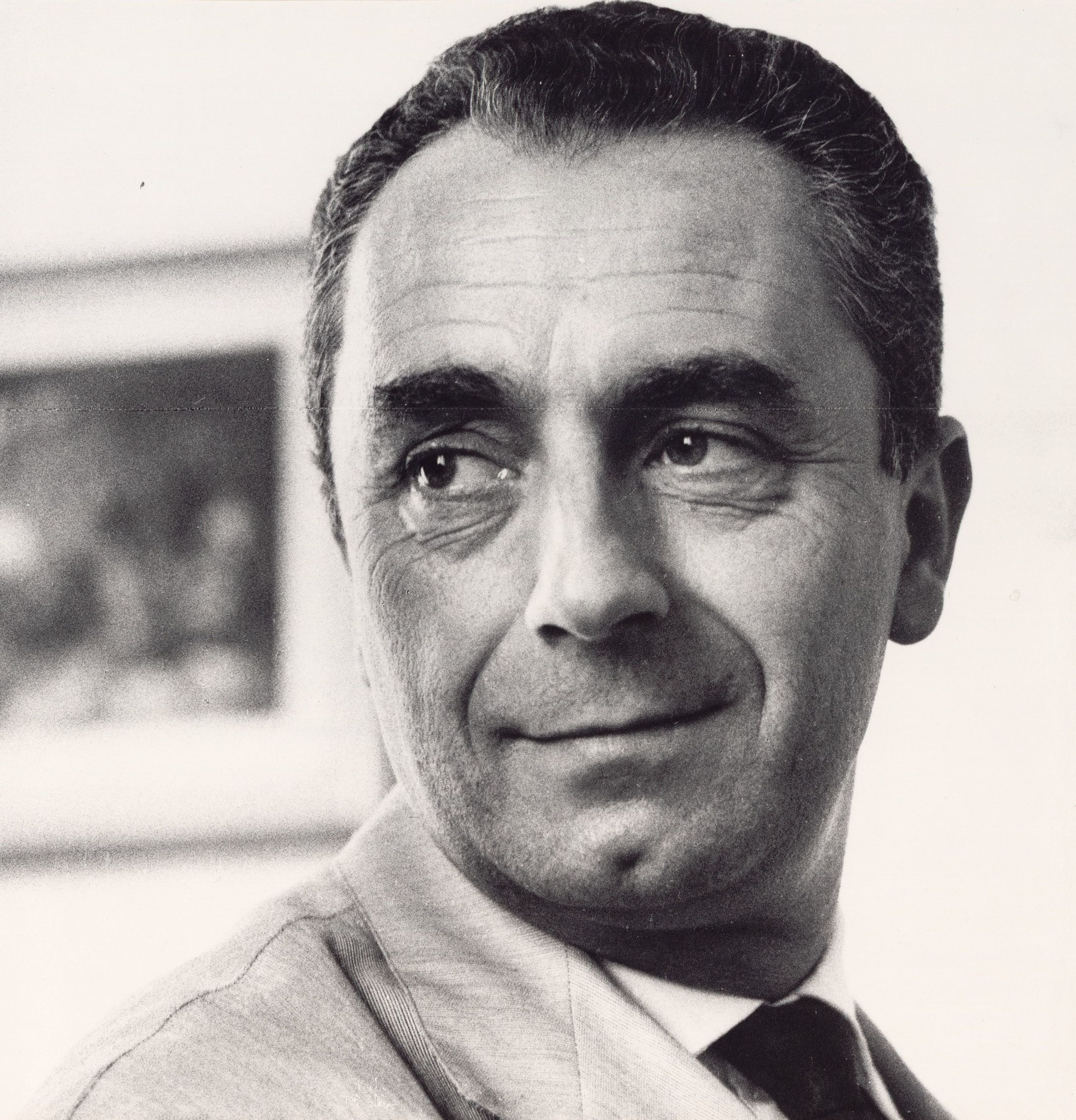
Michelangelo Antonioni won for Red Desert (1964)

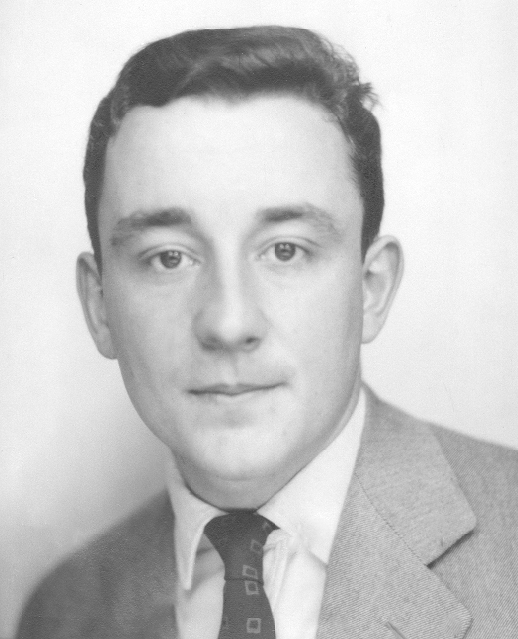
Louis Malle won twice, for Atlantic City (1980) and for Au revoir les enfants (1987)

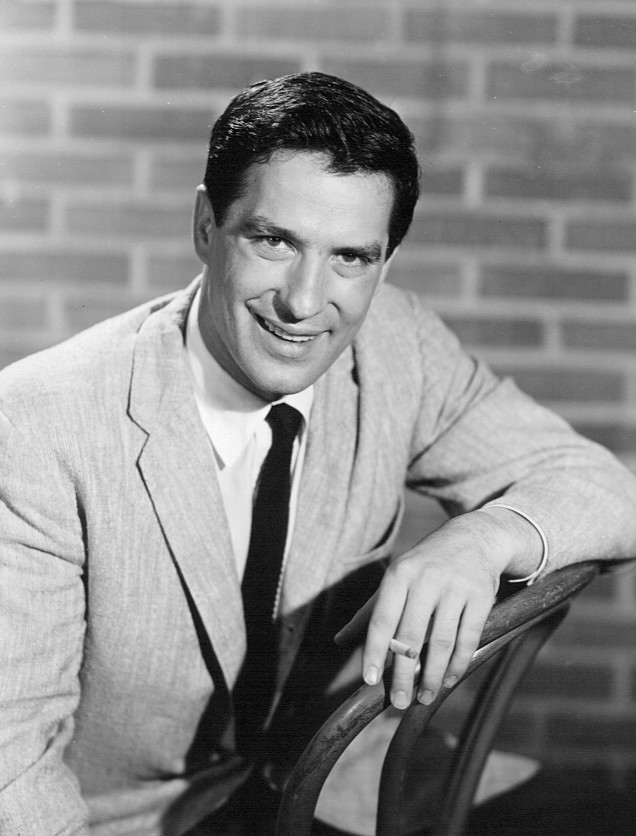
John Cassavetes won for Gloria (1980)

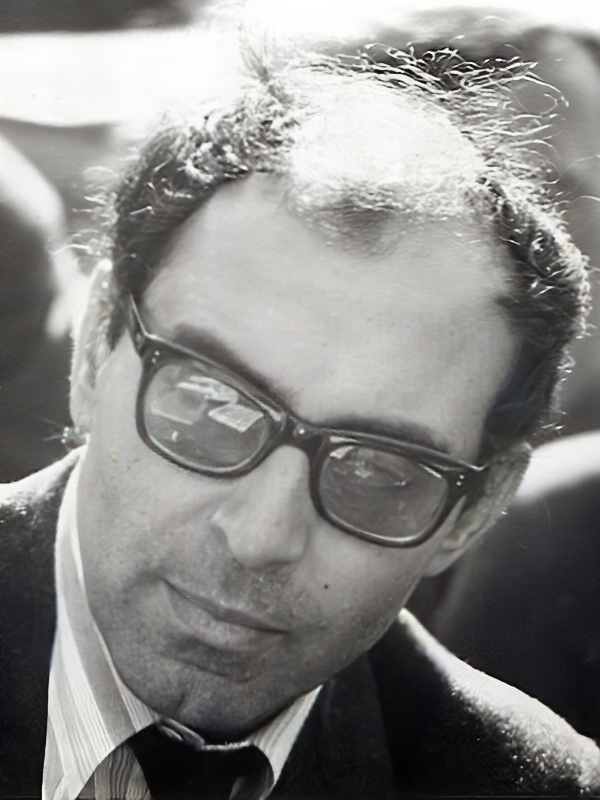
Jean-Luc Godard won for First Name: Carmen (1983)

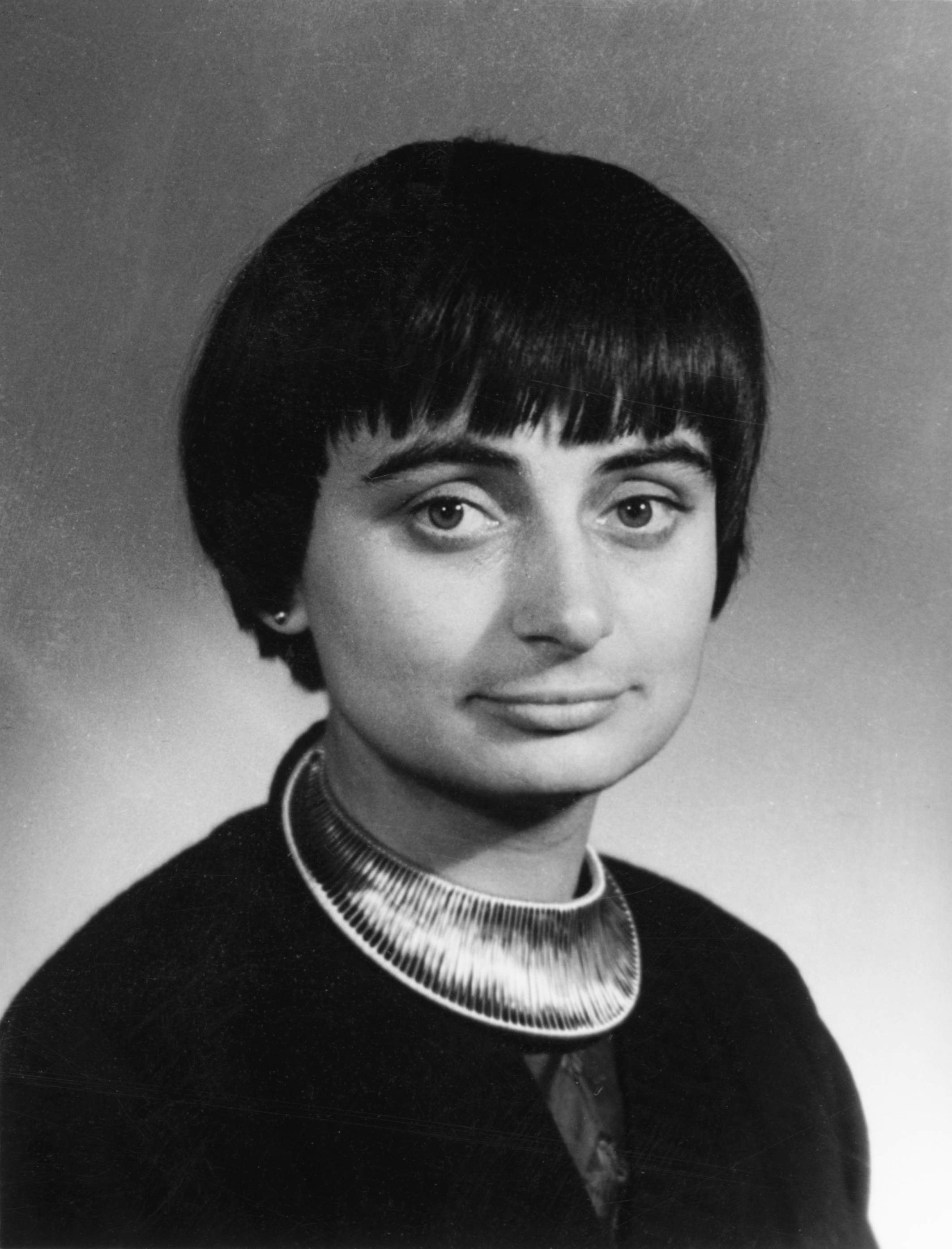
Agnès Varda won for Vagabond (1985)

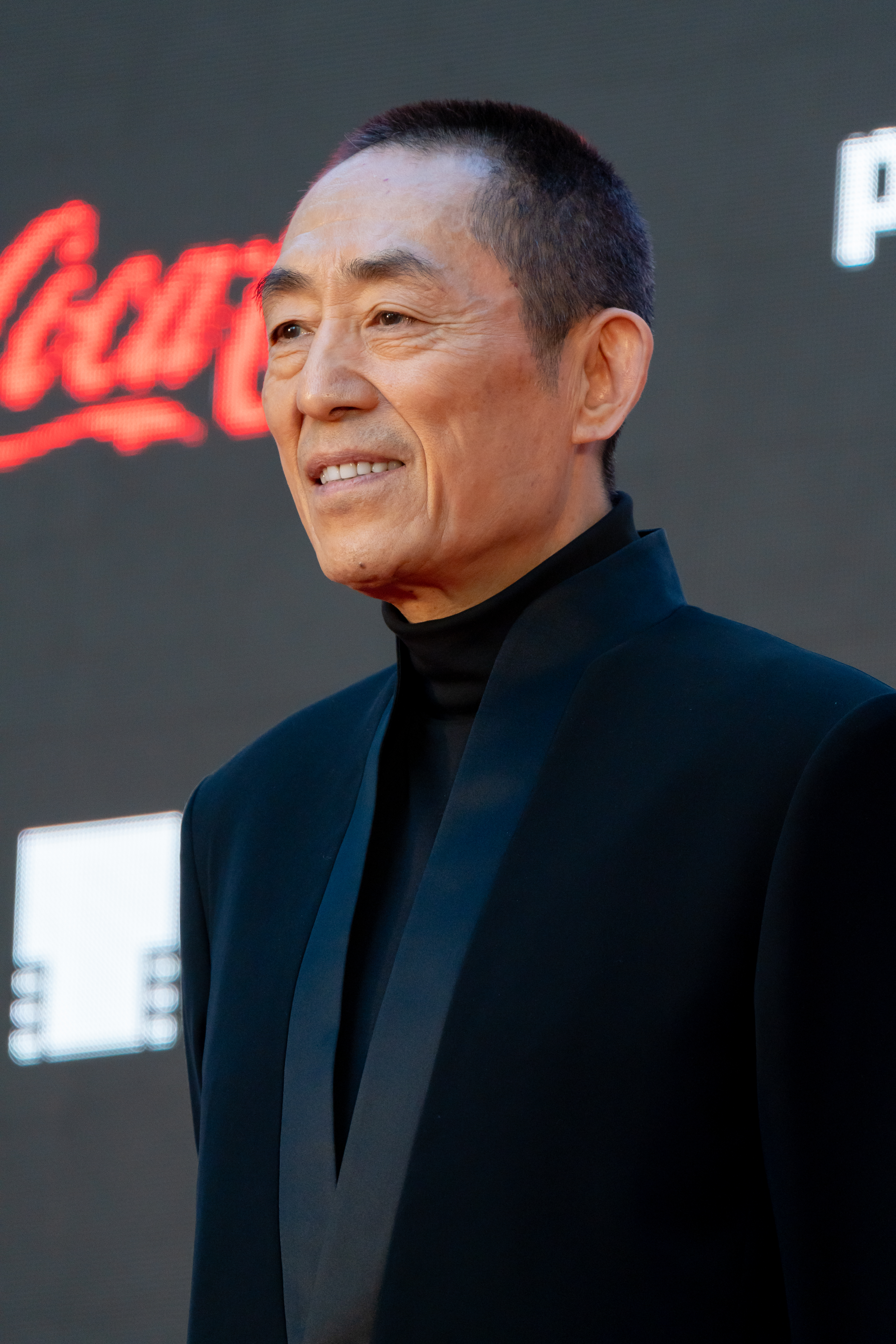
Zhang Yimou won twice for The Story of Qiu Ju (1992) and Not One Less (1999)

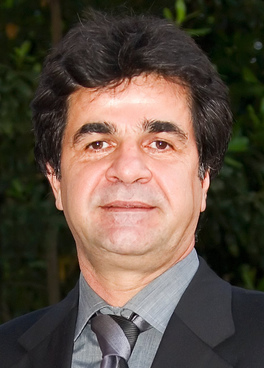
Jafar Panahi won for The Circle (2000)

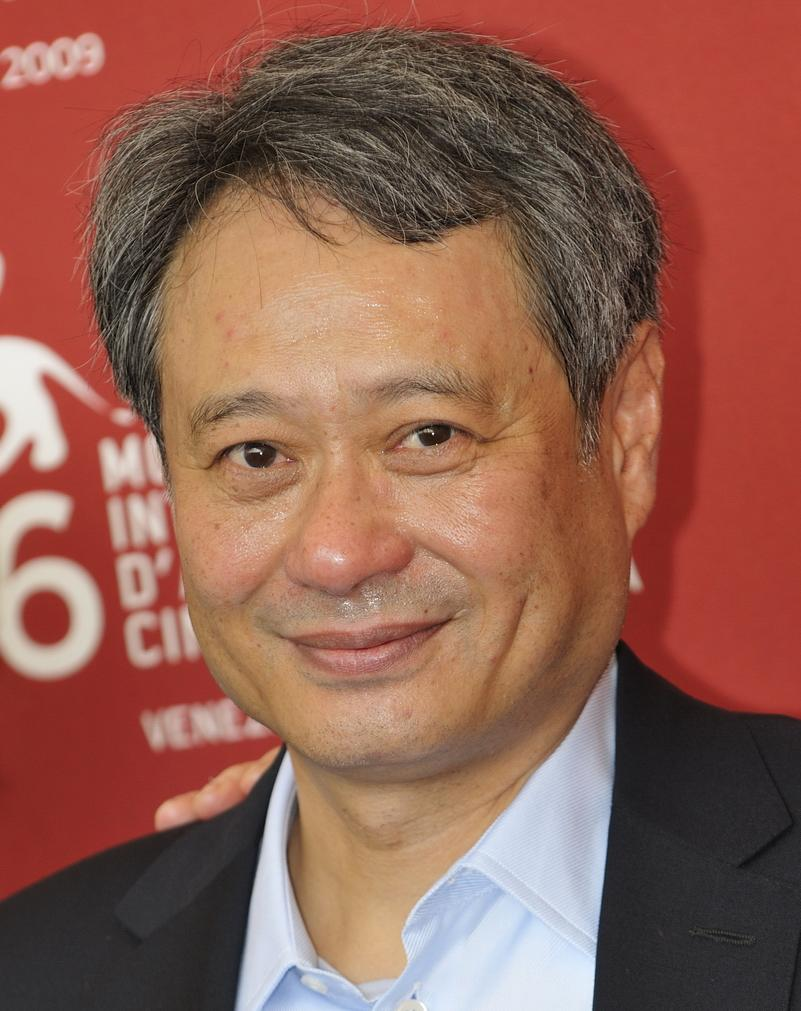
Ang Lee won twice for Brokeback Mountain (2005) and Lust, Caution (2007)

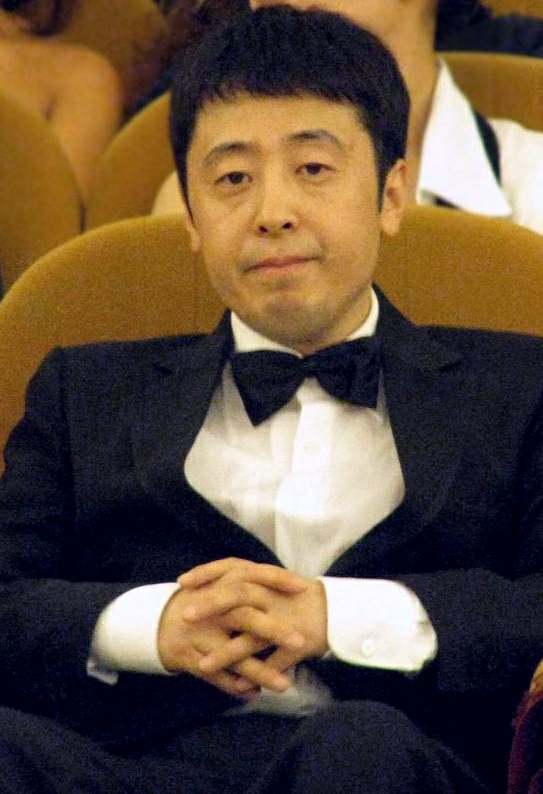
Jia Zhangke won for Still Life (2006)

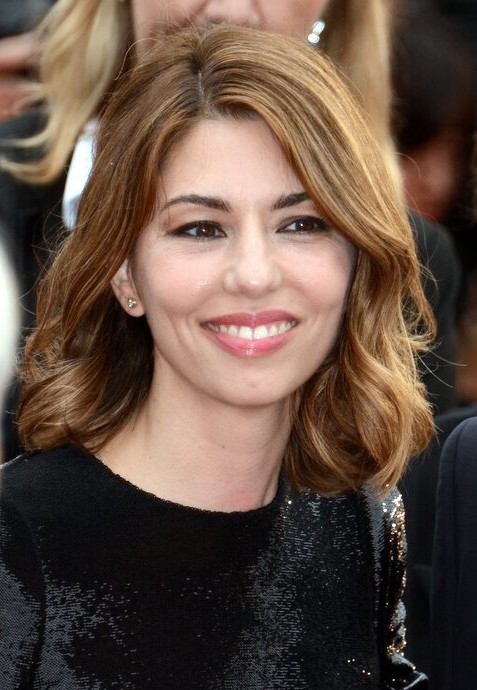
Sofia Coppola won for Somewhere (2010)

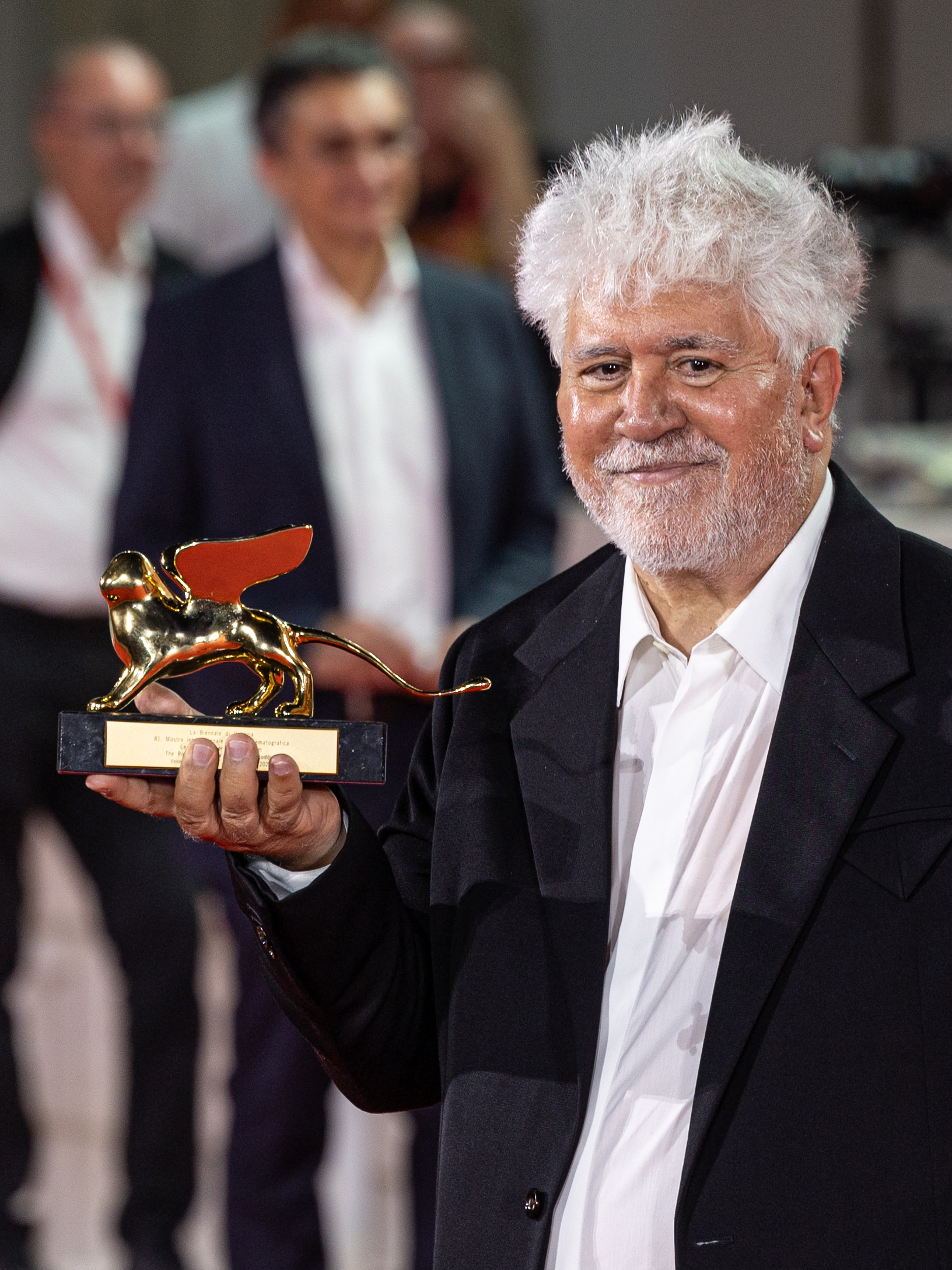
Pedro Almodóvar won for The Room Next Door (2024)

=== 1940s ===
Year	Title	Director	Production Country
1949	Manon	Henri-Georges Clouzot	France

=== 1950s ===
Year	English Title	Original Title	Director(s)	Production Country
1950	Justice Is Done	Justice est faite	André Cayatte	France
1951	Rashomon	羅生門	Akira Kurosawa	Japan
1952	Forbidden Games	Jeux interdits	René Clément	France
1953	No award given, the jury was unable to decide the winner and the prize was declared void			
1954	Romeo and Juliet		Renato Castellani	United Kingdom
1955	Ordet		Carl Theodor Dreyer	Denmark
1956	No award given, the jury was unable to decide the winner and the prize was declared void (Note: There was a tie between The Burmese Harp (ビルマの竪琴) by Kon Ichikawa (Japan) and Calle Mayor by Juan Antonio Bardem (Spain) and the international jury was unable to decide the winner.)			
1957	Aparajito	অপরাজিত	Satyajit Ray	India
1958	Rickshaw Man	無法松の一生	Hiroshi Inagaki	Japan
1959	General Della Rovere	Il generale della Rovere	Roberto Rossellini	France, Italy
1959	The Great War	La grande guerra	Mario Monicelli	France, Italy

=== 1960s ===
Year	English Title	Original Title	Director(s)	Production Country
1960	Tomorrow Is My Turn	Le Passage du Rhin	André Cayatte	France
1961	Last Year at Marienbad	L'année dernière à Marienbad	Alain Resnais	France
1962	Family Diary	Cronaca familiare	Valerio Zurlini	Italy
1962	Ivan's Childhood	Ива́ново де́тство	Andrei Tarkovsky	Soviet Union
1963	Hands over the City	Le mani sulla città	Francesco Rosi	Italy
1964	Red Desert	Il deserto rosso	Michelangelo Antonioni	Italy
1965	Sandra	Vaghe stelle dell'Orsa ...	Luchino Visconti	Italy
1966	The Battle of Algiers	La battaglia di Algeri	Gillo Pontecorvo	Algeria, Italy
1967	Belle de Jour		Luis Buñuel	France
1968	Artists Under the Big Top: Perplexed	Die Artisten in der Zirkuskuppel: Ratlos	Alexander Kluge	West Germany
1969	No award given, this edition of the festival was not competitive			

=== 1970s ===
Year	English Title	Original Title	Director(s)	Production Country	Ref.
1970	No award given, the editions of the festival were not competitive				
1971	No award given, the editions of the festival were not competitive				
1972	No award given, the editions of the festival were not competitive				
1979	No award given, the editions of the festival were not competitive				

=== 1980s ===
Year	English Title	Original Title	Director(s)	Production Country
1980	Atlantic City		Louis Malle	Canada, France
1980	Gloria		John Cassavetes	United States
1981	Marianne and Juliane	Die Bleierne Zeit	Margarethe von Trotta	West Germany
1982	The State of Things	Der Stand der Dinge	Wim Wenders	West Germany
1983	First Name: Carmen	Prénom Carmen	Jean-Luc Godard	France
1984	A Year of the Quiet Sun	Rok spokojnego słońca	Krzysztof Zanussi	Poland
1985	Vagabond	Sans toit ni loi	Agnès Varda	France
1986	The Green Ray	Le Rayon vert	Éric Rohmer	France
1987	Au revoir les enfants		Louis Malle	France, West Germany
1988	The Legend of the Holy Drinker	La leggenda del santo bevitore	Ermanno Olmi	Italy, France
1989	A City of Sadness	悲情城市	Hou Hsiao-hsien	Taiwan

=== 1990s ===
Year	English Title	Original Title	Director(s)	Production Country
1990	Rosencrantz & Guildenstern Are Dead		Tom Stoppard	United Kingdom, United States
1991	Close to Eden	У́рга – территория любви	Nikita Mikhalkov	Soviet Union
1992	The Story of Qiu Ju	秋菊打官司	Zhang Yimou	China
1993	Short Cuts		Robert Altman	United States
1993	Three Colours: Blue	Trois couleurs: Bleu	Krzysztof Kieślowski	France, Poland
1994	Before the Rain	Пред дождот	Milčo Mančevski	Macedonia
1994	Vive L'Amour	愛情萬歲	Tsai Ming-liang	Taiwan
1995	Cyclo	Xích lô	Anh Hung Tran	Vietnam, France
1996	Michael Collins		Neil Jordan	Ireland, United Kingdom
1997	Hana-bi	はなび	Takeshi Kitano	Japan
1998	The Way We Laughed	Così ridevano	Gianni Amelio	Italy
1999	Not One Less	一個都不能少	Zhang Yimou	China

=== 2000s ===
Year	English Title	Original Title	Director(s)	Production Country
2000	The Circle	دایره	Jafar Panahi	Iran
2001	Monsoon Wedding		Mira Nair	India
2002	The Magdalene Sisters		Peter Mullan	Ireland, United Kingdom
2003	The Return	Возвращение	Andrey Zvyagintsev	Russia
2004	Vera Drake		Mike Leigh	United Kingdom
2005	Brokeback Mountain		Ang Lee	United States
2006	Still Life	三峡好人	Jia Zhangke	China
2007	Lust, Caution	色，戒	Ang Lee	Taiwan, China, United States
2008	The Wrestler		Darren Aronofsky	United States
2009	Lebanon	לבנון	Samuel Maoz	Israel

=== 2010s ===
Year	English Title	Original Title	Director(s)	Production Country
2010	Somewhere ^{§}		Sofia Coppola	United States
2011	Faust ^{§}	Фауст	Alexander Sokurov	Russia
2012	Pietà	피에타	Kim Ki-duk	South Korea
2013	Sacro GRA		Gianfranco Rosi	Italy
2014	A Pigeon Sat on a Branch Reflecting on Existence	En duva satt på en gren och funderade på tillvaron	Roy Andersson	Sweden
2015	From Afar	Desde allá	Lorenzo Vigas	Venezuela
2016	The Woman Who Left	Ang Babaeng Humayo	Lav Diaz	Philippines
2017	The Shape of Water		Guillermo del Toro	United States, Mexico
2018	Roma		Alfonso Cuarón	Mexico, United States
2019	Joker		Todd Phillips	United States

=== 2020s ===
Year	English Title	Original Title	Director(s)	Production Country
2020	Nomadland		Chloé Zhao	United States
2021	Happening ^{§}	L'Événement	Audrey Diwan	France
2022	All the Beauty and the Bloodshed		Laura Poitras	United States
2023	Poor Things		Yorgos Lanthimos	Ireland, United Kingdom, United States
2024	The Room Next Door	La habitación de al lado	Pedro Almodóvar	Spain
2025	Father Mother Sister Brother		Jim Jarmusch	United States, Ireland, France
2026	Woman Unknown	Kvinde, ukendt	May el-Toukhy	Denmark, Sweden, Latvia

Notes
^{§} Denotes unanimous win

== Multiple winners ==
Four directors have won the award twice:

- André Cayatte (1950 & 1960)
- Louis Malle (1980 & 1987)
- Zhang Yimou (1992 & 1999)
- Ang Lee (2005 & 2007)

George Clooney, Golden Lion for Lifetime Achievement co-recipient at the 83rd Venice International Film Festival in 2026.

== Golden Lion for Lifetime Achievement ==
The Golden Lion for Lifetime Achievement is awarded to directors, actors, and other personalities from the world of cinema who have distinguished themselves in the art. It joins the Golden Lion, the festival's highest prize, which is instead awarded to a film in competition.

== See also ==
- Silver Lion
- Grand Jury Prize (2nd Place)
- Palme d'Or, the highest prize awarded at the Cannes Film Festival
- Golden Bear, the highest prize awarded at the Berlin Film Festival
