= Woman Unknown (film) =

2026 film by May el-Toukhy

- Danish promotional poster
- Danish: Kvinde ukendt
- Directed by: May el-Toukhy
- Written by: May el-Toukhy; Maren Louise Käehne
- Produced by: Mikael Rieks
- Starring: Mathilde Arcel; Carsten Bjørnlund; Thorbjørn Hedegaard; Marina Bouras
- Cinematography: Jasper Spanning
- Edited by: Rasmus Stensgaard Madsen
- Music by: Mikkel Hess
- Production companies: Nordisk Film; SIA Nafta Films; Nordisk Film Production Sverige; Film i Väst
- Release dates: 6 September 2026 (Venice); 4 February 2027 (Denmark)
- Running time: 124 minutes
- Countries: Denmark; Sweden; Latvia
- Language: Danish

Woman Unknown (Danish: Kvinde ukendt) is a 2026 drama film directed by May el-Toukhy, co-written with Maren Louise Käehne. A co-production of Denmark, Sweden, and Latvia, it stars Mathilde Arcel as Marie, a young nanny and housemaid harbouring a secret shortly after Nazi occupation of Denmark.

The film had its world premiere in the main competition of the 83rd Venice International Film Festival on 6 September 2026, where it won the Golden Lion and Arcel won the Volpi Cup for Best Actress. It will be theatrically released in Denmark on 4 February 2027.

It was also selected as the Danish entry for Best International Feature Film at the 99th Academy Awards.

== Premise ==
Set in the aftermath of World War II, a young nanny prepares to marry her wealthy employer while keeping a secret.

== Cast ==
- Mathilde Arcel as Marie
- Carsten Bjørnlund as Christian
- Thorbjørn Hedegaard as Karl
- Marina Bouras as Esther
- Sofia Nolsøe as Mrs. Berg

== Production ==
In May 2024, it was reported that May el-Toukhy would direct her third feature film titled Woman, Unknown from a screenplay she wrote with Maren Louise Käehne. In November 2024, the project received a €349,000 production grant from Eurimages. In January 2026, it was presented at the Works in Progress section of the Nordic Film Market, held during the Gothenburg Film Festival.

== Release ==
Marina Bouras, Carsten Bjørnlund, May el-Toukhy and Mathilde Arcel Fock at the 83rd Venice International Film Festival

Woman Unknown had its world premiere at the 83rd Venice International Film Festival on 6 September 2026, where it won the Golden Lion. It was the only film directed by a woman selected to compete in the main competition. The film will have its North American Premiere in Centrepiece at the 2026 Toronto International Film Festival on 15 September 2026. In October 2026, it will compete at the 2026 BFI London Film Festival in official competition and at the 71st Valladolid International Film Festival.

In August 2025, TrustNordisk acquired the film's international sales rights. The film will have its theatrical release in Denmark on 4 February 2027.

== Reception ==
=== Critical response ===
On review aggregator Rotten Tomatoes, the film holds an approval rating of 95% based on 20 reviews, with an average rating of 8.3/10. Metacritic, which uses a weighted average, assigned the film a score of 84 out of 100, based on 12 critics, indicating "universal acclaim".

Peter Bradshaw of The Guardian rated the film 4 out of 5 stars, deeming it to be "a very watchable, expertly managed drama about the return of the repressed". Richard Lawson of The Hollywood Reporter described the film as a "a gloomy rummaging through the grand mess of a terrible war" in which the audience could " see some relevance to today, as institutions yet again make concessions to sinister forces striking the poses of purity".

=== Accolades ===
Award ceremony	Date of ceremony	Category	Recipient(s)	Result	Ref.
Venice Film Festival	12 September 2026	Golden Lion	Woman Unknown	Won	
Venice Film Festival	12 September 2026	Volpi Cup for Best Actress	Mathilde Arcel	Won	
BFI London Film Festival	18 October 2026	Best Film	Woman Unknown	Nominated	
European Film Awards	16 January 2027	Best European Film	Woman Unknown	Pending	
European Film Awards	16 January 2027	Best European Actress	Mathilde Arcel	Pending	
European Film Awards	16 January 2027	Best European Costume Designer	Rebecca Richmond, Jūlija Volkinšteine	Pending	

== See also ==
- List of submissions to the 99th Academy Awards for Best International Feature Film
- List of Danish submissions for the Academy Award for Best International Feature Film
