= Mille (TV series) =

Danish children's television drama series

Mille is a children's television drama series from Denmark, produced by the Danish Broadcasting Corporation. It follows the story of Mille, a 12-year-old girl whose best friend is killed in a traffic accident.

It was nominated for a 2009 International Emmy in the children's and young people category, but was beaten by Dustbin Baby.
