= May el-Toukhy =

Danish-Egyptian filmmaker

May el-Thouky
- El-Thouky in 2026
- Born: 17 August 1977 (age 49); Charlottenlund, Denmark
- Education: DASPA, National Film School of Denmark
- Occupation: Filmmaker
- Partner: Mikael Rieks
- Children: 1

May el-Thouky (Arabic: مي الطوخي) is a Danish-Egyptian filmmaker. Most known for her drama film Queen of Hearts (2019). For Woman Unknown (2026), she won the Golden Lion at the 83rd Venice International Film Festival.

== Early life and education ==
El-Thouky was born in 1977 to a Danish mother and Egyptian father, and has said that her father's experience as a first generation immigrant has influenced her film making. She graduated from the Danish National School of Performing Arts in 2002, and later as a film director from the National Film School of Denmark in 2009.

== Career ==
El-Toukhy with her Golden Lion for Woman Unknown at the 83rd Venice International Film Festival

She creates films featuring complicated protagonists, like the 2019 film Queen of Hearts and 2026 Woman Unknown. Woman Unknown was the only film by a female director initially included in the 2026 Venice Film Festival main competition.

She was a signing member of the Dogma 25 movement.

== Personal life ==
El-Thouky is in a relationship with Danish producer Mikael Rieks. She also has a daughter from a previous relationship.

== Filmography ==
=== Feature films ===
Year	English Title	Original Title
2015	Long Story Short	Lang historie kort
2019	Queen of Hearts	Dronningen
2026	Woman Unknown	Kvinde, ukendt

=== Television ===
Year	English Title	Original Title	Notes
2017	The Legacy	Arvingerne	Directed 2 episodes
2017	Ride Upon the Storm	Herrens Veje	Directed 2 episodes
2020	Cry Wolf	Ulven kommer	Directed 2 episodes
2022–23	The Crown		Directed 4 episodes
