= The Strike (1947 film) =

- DVD cover
- Directed by: Karel Steklý
- Written by: Marie Majerová (novel); Karel Steklý
- Starring: Ladislav Boháč; Marie Vášová
- Cinematography: Jaroslav Tuzar
- Edited by: Jan Kohout
- Music by: E. F. Burian
- Production company: Československá filmová společnost
- Distributed by: Státní půjčovna filmů
- Release date: 11 April 1947
- Running time: 77 minutes
- Country: Czechoslovakia
- Language: Czech

The Strike (Czech: Siréna, "Siren") is a 1947 Czechoslovak film about striking miners directed by Karel Steklý. It is based on the novel of the same title by Marie Majerová.

It was awarded Grand International Prize (later known as Golden Lion) in Venice Film Festival in 1947.

== Cast ==
- Ladislav Boháč as Hudec
- Marie Vášová as Hudcová
- Oleg Reif as Rudolf
- Nadězda Mauerová as Růžena
- Pavla Suchá as Emča
- Josef Bek as Karel Hampl
- Bedřich Karen as Bacher
- Josef Dekoj as Černý
- Věra Kalendová as Černá
- Lída Matoušková as Kazdová

| Preceded by n/a | Grand International Prize of Venice; 1947 | Succeeded by Hamlet |
