= Life in Your Hands =

- Russian: В твоих руках жизнь
- Directed by: Nikolai Rozantsev
- Written by: Leonid Agranovich; Arkadi Sakhnin
- Starring: Oleg Strizhenov; Iosif Kutyansky; Viktor Chekmaryov; Anatoli Yushko; Klara Luchko
- Cinematography: Konstantin Ryzhov
- Edited by: Valentina Mironova
- Music by: Oleg Karavaychuk
- Production company: Lenfilm
- Release date: 1958
- Running time: 91 minutes
- Country: Soviet Union
- Language: Russian

Life in Your Hands (Russian: В твоих руках жизнь) is a 1958 Soviet detective film directed by Nikolai Rozantsev.

== Plot ==
The film is based on real events that occurred in 1957 in the city of Kursk, though the setting is referred to only as "City N" in the story. During their retreat from the city in World War II, German troops secretly buried a cache of aerial bombs and landmines in a deserted area. Fifteen years later, this area has become the center of a newly built residential district, and the buried explosives remain a deadly threat.

The film opens with German soldiers hurriedly mining the ammunition depot as Soviet artillery fire grows nearer in the distance. In the present day, during construction work on the site, a powerful explosion kills an excavator operator and his young daughter. A military investigation reveals a large, booby-trapped munitions cache left behind by the Germans, most of it made up of vertically placed explosives. Specialists conclude that the system is rigged to detonate if tampered with and must be destroyed in place. However, the potential blast radius of nearly two kilometers would endanger much of the rebuilt city, and a complete evacuation is proposed—prompting public outcry and protest.

The threat of a catastrophic explosion unites the community. Party officials and military personnel work together, sharing the belief that “the lives of many are in our hands”. Colonel, the city's military commandant, faces the daunting challenge of defusing the depot without causing destruction or casualties. Together with Pavel Stepanovich, the city party committee secretary, he recognizes the immense risk the operation entails, especially for the soldiers tasked with handling the dangerous materials. Despite the dangers, they approve a bold disposal plan proposed by Captain Dudin and Lieutenant Boyko.

Captain Dudin, introduced as a devoted husband and father in his new apartment, immediately transforms into a focused and disciplined officer upon learning of the situation. He becomes the central figure in the unfolding events, supported by a team of dedicated soldiers and sergeants. When five volunteers are needed for the mission, Dudin is the first to step forward. He is followed by Sergeant Mozharov, who seeks redemption and the approval of the woman he loves, despite being on extended leave and ready to return home. For a moment, Mozharov fears he won’t be chosen, but when Dudin calls his name, he proudly joins the team.

Other volunteers include Sergeant Major Vanin, Sergeants Khasanov and Paichadze, Private Bannik, and armored vehicle driver Sokolikov. The evacuation of the district begins as the team prepares for the operation.

The film reaches its emotional peak during the scenes of bomb disposal and ammunition removal. Viewers witness the intense tension as wires connected to detonators are cut, and heavy shells are carefully lifted from the ground and placed in trailers for removal.

The final scenes depict Captain Dudin’s return home. On the way, he learns that his wife has gone into labor. Filled with anxiety, he rushes to the hospital, where he is informed that he has a newborn son. In a brief exchange, a woman doctor scolds him for his visible fear, suggesting that he gather himself.

== Cast ==
- Oleg Strizhenov
- Iosif Kutyansky
- Viktor Chekmaryov
- Anatoli Yushko
- Klara Luchko
- Marina Strizhenova
- Yelena Kornilova
- Rezo Chkheidze
