= 44th Venice International Film Festival =

1987 film festival in Italy

- Location: Venice, Italy
- Founded: 1932
- Awards: Golden Lion: Au revoir les enfants
- Festival date: 29 August – 9 September 1987
- Website: Website

Venice Film Festival chronology
- 45th 43rd

The 44th annual Venice International Film Festival was held from 29 August to 9 September 1987.

Greek actress and singer Irene Papas was the Jury President of the main competition. The Golden Lion winner was Au revoir les enfants directed by Louis Malle.

== Jury ==
The following people comprised the 1987 jury:

- Irene Papas, Greek actress and singer - Jury President
- Sabine Azéma, French actress and singer
- John Bailey, American cinematographer and director
- Anja Breien, Norwegian director
- Ana Carolina, Brazilian filmmaker
- Beatriz Guido, Argentine author and screenwriter
- Carlo Lizzani, Italian filmmaker and film critic
- Károly Makk, Hungarian filmmaker
- Sergei Solovyov, Soviet filmmaker
- Vittorio Storaro, Italian cinematographer
- Michael York, British actor
- Regina Ziegler, West German producer

== Official Sections ==
The following films were selected to be screened:

=== In Competition ===
English title	Original title	Director(s)	Production country
Au revoir les enfants		Louis Malle	France, West Germany, Italy
A Boy from Calabria	Un ragazzo di Calabria	Luigi Comencini	Italy
Comedy!	Comédie!	Jacques Doillon	France
Deaf to the City	Le sourd dans la ville	Mireille Dansereau	Canada
Divine Words	Divinas palabras	José Luis García Sánchez	Spain
The Ghost Valley	La vallée fantôme	Alain Tanner	Switzerland
The Gold Rimmed Glasses	Gli occhiali d'oro	Giuliano Montaldo	Italy
Hip Hip Hurrah!	Hip hip hurra!	Kjell Grede	Sweden
House of Games		David Mamet	United States
If the Sun Never Returns	Si le soleil ne revenait pas	Claude Goretta	France, Switzerland
Long Live the Lady!	Lunga vita alla signora!	Ermanno Olmi	Italy
Made in Heaven		Alan Rudolph	United States
Maurice		James Ivory	United Kingdom
Motherland Hotel	Anayurt Oteli	Ömer Kavur	Turkey
Mountains Of The Moon	O Desejado	Paulo Rocha	Portugal
Oridathu		G. Aravindan	India
Plumbum, or The Dangerous Game	Плюмбум, или опасная игра	Vadim Abdrashitov	Soviet Union
Quartiere		Silvano Agosti	Italy
Season of Monsters	Szörnyek évadja	Miklós Jancsó	Hungary
The Surrogate Woman	씨받이	Im Kwon-taek	South Korea
The Tale of Ruby Rose		Roger Scholes	Australia
A Taxing Woman	マルサの女	Juzo Itami	Japan
The Veiled Man	L'homme voilé	Maroun Bagdadi	Lebanon, France

=== Out of Competition ===
English title	Original title	Director(s)	Production country
Boyfriends and Girlfriends	L'Ami de mon amie	Éric Rohmer	France
The Dead		John Huston	United Kingdom
Julia and Julia	Giulia e Giulia	Peter Del Monte	Italy
The Untouchables		Brian De Palma	United States
The Witches of Eastwick		George Miller	United States
Special Bertolucci
Nostalgia di un colossal		Paolo Brunatto	Italy

=== Retrospectives ===
English title	Original title	Director(s)	Year	Production country
Tribute to Cinecittà
Le Amiche		Michelangelo Antonioni	1955	Italy
Bellissima		Luchino Visconti	1951	Italy
The Betrothed	I promessi sposi	Mario Camerini	1941	Italy
The Desert of the Tartars	Il deserto dei tartari	Valerio Zurlini	1976	Italy, France, West Germany, Iran
La Dolce Vita		Federico Fellini	1960	Italy, France
General Della Rovere	Il generale Della Rovere	Roberto Rossellini	1959	Italy, France
The Iron Crown	La corona di ferro	Alessandro Blasetti	1941	Italy
Luciano Serra, Pilot	Luciano Serra pilota	Goffredo Alessandrini	1938	Italy
Teresa Venerdì		Vittorio De Sica	1941	Italy
Tribute to Joseph L. Mankiewicz
All About Eve		Joseph L. Mankiewicz	1950	United States
The Barefoot Contessa		Joseph L. Mankiewicz	1954	United States, Italy
Carol for Another Christmas		Joseph L. Mankiewicz	1964	United States
Cleopatra		Joseph L. Mankiewicz	1963	United States
Dragonwyck		Joseph L. Mankiewicz	1946	United States
Escape		Joseph L. Mankiewicz	1948	United Kingdom, United States
5 Fingers		Joseph L. Mankiewicz	1952	United States
The Ghost and Mrs. Muir		Joseph L. Mankiewicz	1947	United States
Guys and Dolls		Joseph L. Mankiewicz	1955	United States
The Honey Pot		Joseph L. Mankiewicz	1967	United States
House of Strangers		Joseph L. Mankiewicz	1949	United States
Julius Caesar		Joseph L. Mankiewicz	1953	United States
King: A Filmed Record... Montgomery to Memphis		Sidney Lumet, Joseph L. Mankiewicz	1970	United States
The Late George Apley		Joseph L. Mankiewicz	1947	United States
A Letter to Three Wives		Joseph L. Mankiewicz	1949	United States
No Way Out		Joseph L. Mankiewicz	1950	United States
People Will Talk		Joseph L. Mankiewicz	1951	United States
The Quiet American		Joseph L. Mankiewicz	1958	United States
Sleuth		Joseph L. Mankiewicz	1972	United Kingdom, United States
Somewhere in the Night		Joseph L. Mankiewicz	1946	United States
Suddenly, Last Summer		Joseph L. Mankiewicz	1959	United States
There Was a Crooked Man...		Joseph L. Mankiewicz	1970	United States

== Independent Sections ==
=== Venice International Film Critics' Week ===
The following feature films were selected to be screened as In Competition for this section:

English title	Original title	Director(s)	Year
The Burglar	Vzlomšcik	Valerij Ogorodnikov	Soviet Union
Dragon Chow	Drachenfutter	Jan Schütte	West Germany, Switzerland
Hidden City		Stephen Poliakoff	United Kingdom
Italian Night	Notte Italiana	Carlo Mazzacurati	Italy
Killing Time	Poussière d'ange	Edouard Niermans	France
Sierra Leone		Uwe Schrader	West Germany
True and Faithful Account	Relação fiel e verdadeira	Margarida Gil	Portugal

== Official Awards ==
=== Main Competition ===
- Golden Lion: Au revoir les enfants by Louis Malle
- Grand Special Jury Prize: Hip hip hurra! by Kjell Grede
- Silver Lion:
  - Maurice by James Ivory
  - Long Live the Lady! by Ermanno Olmi
- Golden Osella:
  - Best Screenplay: David Mamet for House of Games
  - Best Cinematography: Sten Holmberg for Hip hip hurra!
  - Best Score: Richard Robbins for Maurice
  - Best Set Design: Nanà Cecchi & Luciano Ricceri for The Gold Rimmed Glasses
  - Honorable Mention: Season of Monsters by Miklós Jancsó
- Volpi Cup for Best Actor: Hugh Grant & James Wilby for Maurice
- Volpi Cup for Best Actress: Kang Soo-yeon for The Surrogate Woman

=== Career Golden Lion ===
- Joseph L. Mankiewicz
- Luigi Comencini

== Independent Awards ==
=== The President of the Italian Senate's Gold Medal ===
- Plumbum, or The Dangerous Game by Vadim Abdrashitov

=== Golden Ciak ===
- Best Film: House of Games by David Mamet
- Best Actor: Bernard Giraudeau for The Veiled Man
- Best Actress: Kelly McGillis for Made in Heaven
  - Special Golden Ciak: Au revoir les enfants by Louis Malle

=== 'Commendatore al merito della Repubblica' Medal ===
- Moritz de Hadeln'

=== FIPRESCI Prize ===
- Anayurt Oteli by Ömer Kavur
- Long Live the Lady! by Ermanno Olmi
- Critics Week: Vzlomshchik by Valeri Ogorodnikov

=== OCIC Award ===
- Au revoir les enfants by Louis Malle
  - Honorable Mention: Deaf to the City by Mireille Dansereau

=== UNICEF Award ===
- Au revoir les enfants by Louis Malle

=== UNESCO Award ===
- Dragon Chow by Jan Schütte

=== Pasinetti Award ===
- Best Film: House of Games by David Mamet
- Best Actor: Gian Maria Volonté for A Boy from Calabria
- Best Actress: Melita Jurisic for The Tale of Ruby Rose

=== Pietro Bianchi Award ===
- Dino Risi

=== Elvira Notari Prize ===
- The Tale of Ruby Rose by Roger Scholes

=== Sergio Trasatti Award ===
- Au revoir les enfants by Louis Malle

=== Cinecritica Award ===
- Dragon Chow by Jan Schütte
- House of Games by David Mamet

=== Award of the Society for Psychology ===
- Long Live the Lady! by Ermanno Olmi
