= 43rd Venice International Film Festival =

1986 film festival in Italy

- Location: Venice, Italy
- Founded: 1932
- Awards: Golden Lion: The Green Ray
- Artistic director: Gian Luigi Rondi
- Festival date: 30 August – 10 September 1986
- Website: Website

Venice Film Festival chronology
- 44th 42nd

The 43rd annual Venice International Film Festival was held on 30 August to 10 September, 1986. It was the last edition directed by Gian Luigi Rondi.

French writer and filmmaker Alain Robbe-Grillet was the Jury President for the main competition. The Golden Lion winner was The Green Ray directed by Éric Rohmer.

== Jury ==
The following people comprised the 1986 jury:

- Alain Robbe-Grillet, French writer and filmmaker - Jury President
- Chantal Akerman, Belgian filmmaker
- Jörn Donner, Finnish writer
- Nelson Pereira dos Santos, Brazilian filmmaker
- Pál Gábor, Hungarian filmmaker
- Roman Gubern, Spanish film historian
- Pontus Hultén, Swedish art collector and museum director
- Alberto Lattuada, Italian director
- Nanni Moretti, Italian filmmaker
- Eldar Shengelaia, Soviet filmmaker
- Fernando Solanas, Argentine filmmaker
- Peter Ustinov, British actor, filmmaker and writer
- Bernhard Wicki, Austrian-Swiss actor, filmmaker and writer
- Catherine Wyler, American producer

== Official Sections ==
The following films were selected to be screened:

=== In Competition ===
| English title | Original title | Director(s) | Production country |
|---|---|---|---|
| Amorosa | | Mai Zetterling | Sweden |
| The Beekeeper | Ο Μελισσοκόμος | Theo Angelopoulos | Greece |
| Christmas Present | Regalo di Natale | Pupi Avati | Italy |
| Fatherland | | Ken Loach | United Kingdom, West Germany |
| Final Take | キネマの天地 | Yoji Yamada | Japan |
| The Green Ray | Le rayon vert | Éric Rohmer | France |
| Guard Me, My Talisman | Храни меня, мой талисман | Roman Balayan | Soviet Union |
| The Journey | Die Reise | Markus Imhoof | Switzerland |
| A King and His Movie | La película del rey | Carlos Sorin | Argentina |
| Linna | | Jaakko Pakkasvirta | Finland |
| My Case | O meu caso | Manoel De Oliveira | Portugal |
| The Prude | La puritaine | Jacques Doillon | France |
| Romance | | Massimo Mazzucco | Italy |
| A Room with a View | | James Ivory | United Kingdom |
| Round Midnight | Autour de minuit | Bertrand Tavernier | France |
| The Silence of the Poet | Das Schweigen des Dichters | Peter Lilienthal | West Germany |
| A Tale of Love | Storia d'amore | Francesco Maselli | Italy |
| Time | Idö van | Péter Gothár | Hungary |
| Werther | | Pilar Miró | Spain |
| Wild Pigeon | Чужая белая и рябой | Sergei Solovyov | Soviet Union |
| The Wolf at the Door | Oviri | Henning Carlsen | Denmark, France |
| X | | Oddvar Einarson | Norway |

=== Out of Competition ===
| English title | Original title | Director(s) | Production country |
|---|---|---|---|
| Heartburn | | Mike Nichols | United States |
| La Storia | | Luigi Comencini | Italy |
| Mélo | | Alain Resnais | France |
| My Case | O meu caso | Manoel de Oliveira | Portugal |

=== Special Events ===
| English title | Original title | Director(s) | Production country |
|---|---|---|---|
| '38 | | Wolfgang Glück | Austria |
| The Blood | Kan | Serif Gören, Zeki Ökten | Turkey |
| Demoner | | Carsten Brandt | Sweden |
| Paltoquet | | Michel Deville | France |

=== Free Space for Authors ===
| English title | Original title | Director(s) | Production country |
|---|---|---|---|
| Acta general de Chile | | Miguel Littin | Chile |
| Anemia | | Alberto Abruzzese, Achille Pisanti | Italy |
| Franza | Der Fall Franza | Xaver Schwarzenberger | West Germany |
| The Pointsman | De wisselwachter | Jos Stelling | Netherlands |
| One Glance, and Love Breaks Out | Ein Blick und die Liebe bricht aus | Jutta Brückner | West Germany |
| Embriók | | Pál Zolnay | Hungary |
| The Flavor of Corn | Il sapore del grano | Gianni Da Campo | Italy |
| Innocenza | | Villi Hermann | Switzerland |
| Miss Mary | | María Luisa Bemberg | Argentina |
| Oi kekarmenoi | Οι κεκαρμένοι | Dimitris Makris | Greece |

=== Venezia Giovani ===
| English title | Original title | Director(s) | Production country |
|---|---|---|---|
| About Last Night | | Edward Zwick | United States |
| Aliens | | James Cameron | United States, United Kingdom |
| The American Way | | Maurice Phillips | United States |
| Big Trouble in Little China | | John Carpenter | United States |
| Jubiabá | | Nelson Pereira dos Santos | Brazil, France |
| Legal Eagles | | Ivan Reitman | United States |
| Nanou | | Conny Templeman | France |
| Ping Pong | | Po-Chih Leong | United Kingdom |
| Ruthless People | | Zucker-Abrahams-Zucker | United States |
| Short Circuit | | John Badham | United States |

=== Venezia TV ===
| English title | Original title | Director(s) | Production country |
|---|---|---|---|
| Badge of the Assassin | | Mel Damski | United States |
| The Blessed Ones | De två saliga | Ingmar Bergman | Sweden |
| Blood Ties | Il cugino americano | Giacomo Battiato | Italy, United States |
| Christmas Present | | Tony Bicât | United Kingdom |
| The Death of the Heart | | Peter Hammond | United Kingdom |
| Erdsegen | | Karin Brandauer | Germany |
| L'inconnue de Vienne | | Bernard Stora | France |
| The Insurance Man | | Richard Eyre | United Kingdom |
| Laghi profondi | | Bruno Soldini | Switzerland |
| Tramp at the Door | | Allan Kroeker | Canada |
| L'ultima mazurka | | Gianfranco Bettetini | Italy |

== Independent Sections ==
=== Venice International Film Critics' Week ===
The following feature films were selected to be screened as In Competition for this section:

| English title | Original title | Director(s) | Production country |
|---|---|---|---|
| Disorder | Désordre | Olivier Assayas | France |
| Sembra morto... ma è solo svenuto | | Felice Farina | Italy |
| Walls of Glass | | Scott Goldstein | United States |
| To Sleep so as to Dream | 夢みるように眠りたい | Kaizo Hayashi | Japan |
| Massey Sahib | | Pradip Krishen | India |
| Malcolm | | Nadia Tass | Australia |
| Abel | | Alex van Warmerdam | Netherlands |

== Official Awards ==
=== Main Competition ===
- Golden Lion: The Green Ray by Eric Rohmer
- Grand Special Jury Prize:
  - Wild Pigeon by Sergei Solovyov
  - A Tale of Love by Francesco Maselli
- Special Jury Prize: X by Oddvar Einarson
- Silver Lion:
  - Best First Work: A King and His Movie by Carlos Sorin
- Volpi Cup for Best Actor: Carlo delle Piane for Christmas Present
- Volpi Cup for Best Actress: Valeria Golino for A Tale of Love

=== Career Golden Lion ===
- Paolo and Vittorio Taviani
