= Grand Prix (Belgian Film Critics Association) =

Annual film award

The Grand Prix is an annual award presented by the Belgian Film Critics Association (French: Union de la critique de cinéma, UCC).

It was introduced in 1954 by the organizing committee to honor the film of the year "that contributed the most to the enrichment and influence of cinema". In December of each year, the organization meets to vote for films released in the previous calendar year. To determine the nominations, ballots are sent in by the members – select knowledgeable film enthusiasts, academics, filmmakers, and journalists – and subsequently tabulated in order to decide the winner.

== Winners and nominees ==
In the following lists, the first titles listed are winners. These are also in bold and; those not in bold are nominees.

=== 1950s ===
Year	Film	Director
1955	**Neapolitan Carousel** (Carosello napoletano)	Ettore Giannini
1956	**Children, Mother, and the General** (Kinder, Mütter und ein General)	László Benedek
1957	**Picnic**	Joshua Logan
1958	**12 Angry Men**	Sidney Lumet
1959	**Paths of Glory**	Stanley Kubrick

=== 1960s ===
Year	Film	Director
1960	**Hiroshima mon amour**	Alain Resnais
1961	**The Left Handed Gun**	Arthur Penn
1962	**Viridiana**	Luis Buñuel
1963	**The Miracle Worker**	Arthur Penn
1964	**Ride the High Country**	Sam Peckinpah
1965	**Dr. Strangelove**	Stanley Kubrick
1966	**The Knack ...and How to Get It**	Richard Lester
1967	**The Woman in the Dunes** (Suna no onna)	Hiroshi Teshigahara
1968	**Accident**	Joseph Losey
1969	**Daisies** (Sedmikrásky)	Věra Chytilová

=== 1970s ===
Year	Film	Director
1970	**Ådalen 31**	Bo Widerberg
1971	**They Shoot Horses, Don't They?**	Sydney Pollack
1972	**The Conformist** (Il conformista)	Bernardo Bertolucci
1973	**Cabaret**	Bob Fosse
1974	**Fat City**	John Huston
1975	**Somewhere Beyond Love** (Delitto d'amore)	Luigi Comencini
1976	**Aguirre, the Wrath of God** (Aguirre, der Zorn Gottes)	Werner Herzog
1977	**A Woman Under the Influence**	John Cassavetes
1978	**Dodes'ka-den** (Dodesukaden)	Akira Kurosawa
1979	**Harlan County, USA**	Barbara Kopple

=== 1980s ===
Year	Film	Director
1980	**Newsfront**	Phillip Noyce
1981	**The Herd** (Sürü)	Zeki Ökten
1982	**The Elephant Man**	David Lynch
1983	**Cutter's Way**	Ivan Passer
1984	**Zelig**	Woody Allen
1985	**The Draughtsman's Contract**	Peter Greenaway
1986	**Stranger Than Paradise**	Jim Jarmusch
1987	**Alpine Fire** (Höhenfeuer)	Fredi M. Murer
1988	**Wings of Desire** (Der Himmel über Berlin)	Wim Wenders
1989	**Bird**	Clint Eastwood
1989	Babette's Feast (Babettes gæstebud)	Gabriel Axel
1989	Long Live the Lady! (Lunga vita alla signora!)	Ermanno Olmi
1989	Hope and Glory	John Boorman
1989	House of Games	David Mamet

=== 1990s ===
Year	Film	Director
1990	**Distant Voices, Still Lives**	Terence Davies
1990	Black Rain (Kuroi ame)	Shohei Imamura
1990	Dead Ringers	David Cronenberg
1990	Do the Right Thing	Spike Lee
1990	Tucker: The Man and His Dream	Francis Ford Coppola
1991	**A Short Film About Love** (Krótki film o miłości)	Krzysztof Kieślowski
1991	Freeze Die Come to Life (Zamri, umri, voskresni!)	Vitali Kanevsky
1991	Roger & Me	Michael Moore
1991	The Hairdresser's Husband (Le Mari de la Coiffeuse)	Patrice Leconte
1991	Wild at Heart	David Lynch
1992	**An Angel at My Table**	Jane Campion
1992	Barton Fink	Joel and Ethan Coen
1992	Delicatessen	Marc Caro and Jean-Pierre Jeunet
1992	Miller's Crossing	Joel and Ethan Coen
1992	The Silence of the Lambs	Jonathan Demme
1993	**Raise the Red Lantern** (Da hong deng long gao gao gua)	Zhang Yimou
1993	Jacquot de Nantes	Agnès Varda
1993	Riff-Raff	Ken Loach
1993	The Stolen Children (Il ladro di bambini)	Gianni Amelio
1993	Trust	Hal Hartley
1994	**Raining Stones**	Ken Loach
1994	City of Hope	John Sayles
1994	Naked	Mike Leigh
1994	One False Move	Carl Franklin
1994	Reservoir Dogs	Quentin Tarantino
1995	**Exotica**	Atom Egoyan
1995	Dear Diary (Caro diario)	Nanni Moretti
1995	Pulp Fiction	Quentin Tarantino
1995	Ruby in Paradise	Victor Nuñez
1995	What's Eating Gilbert Grape	Lasse Hallström
1996	**Little Odessa**	James Gray
1996	Before the Rain (Pred doždot)	Milcho Manchevski
1996	Ed Wood	Tim Burton
1996	Heavenly Creatures	Peter Jackson
1996	Once Were Warriors	Lee Tamahori
1997	**Drifting Clouds** (Kauas pilvet karkaavat)	Aki Kaurismäki
1997	Bound	The Wachowskis
1997	Crash	David Cronenberg
1997	Fargo	Joel and Ethan Coen
1997	La Promesse	Jean-Pierre and Luc Dardenne
1998	**Lone Star**	John Sayles
1998	The Life of Jesus (La vie de Jésus)	Bruno Dumont
1998	Lost Highway	David Lynch
1998	The Full Monty	Peter Cattaneo
1998	When We Were Kings	Leon Gast
1999	**Hana-bi**	Takeshi Kitano
1999	Jackie Brown	Quentin Tarantino
1999	Only God Sees Me (Dieu seul me voit)	Bruno Podalydès
1999	The Big Lebowski	Joel and Ethan Coen
1999	The General	John Boorman

=== 2000s ===
Year	Film	Director
2000	**The Celebration** (Festen)	Thomas Vinterberg
2000	Ghost Dog: The Way of the Samurai	Jim Jarmusch
2000	Happiness	Todd Solondz
2000	Run Lola Run (Lola rennt)	Tom Tykwer
2000	The Wind Will Carry Us (Bad ma ra khahad bord)	Abbas Kiarostami
2001	**In the Mood for Love** (Fa yeung nin wa)	Wong Kar-wai
2001	American Beauty	Sam Mendes
2001	Our Lady of the Assassins (La virgen de los sicarios)	Barbet Schroeder
2001	Princess Mononoke (Mononoke-hime)	Hayao Miyazaki
2001	Suzhou River (Sūzhōu Hé)	Lou Ye
2002	**Amores perros**	Alejandro González Iñárritu
2002	Memento	Christopher Nolan
2002	The Gleaners and I (Les glaneurs et la glaneuse)	Agnès Varda
2002	The Pledge	Sean Penn
2002	Yi Yi (Yi Yi)	Edward Yang
2003	**Strokes of Fire** (Chi-hwa-seon)	Im Kwon-taek
2003	Bowling for Columbine	Michael Moore
2003	Ghost World	Terry Zwigoff
2003	Hop	Dominique Standaert
2003	Lantana	Ray Lawrence
2004	**The Best of Youth** (La meglio gioventù)	Marco Tullio Giordana
2004	Adaptation	Spike Jonze
2004	Punch-Drunk Love	Paul Thomas Anderson
2004	Spirited Away (Sen to Chihiro no Kamikakushi)	Hayao Miyazaki
2004	The Quiet American	Phillip Noyce
2005	**Oldboy** (Oldeuboi)	Park Chan-wook
2005	American Splendor	Shari Springer Berman and Robert Pulcini
2005	Eternal Sunshine of the Spotless Mind	Michel Gondry
2005	Infernal Affairs (Mou gaan dou)	Andrew Lau and Alan Mak
2005	Lost in Translation	Sofia Coppola
2006	**3-Iron** (Bin-jip)	Kim Ki-duk
2006	A History of Violence	David Cronenberg
2006	Sideways	Alexander Payne
2006	The Sea Inside (Mar adentro)	Alejandro Amenábar
2006	The Three Burials of Melquiades Estrada	Tommy Lee Jones
2007	**Syriana**	Stephen Gaghan
2007	Pan's Labyrinth (El laberinto del fauno)	Guillermo del Toro
2007	The Page Turner (Tourneuse de pages)	Denis Dercourt
2007	The Squid and the Whale	Noah Baumbach
2007	The Wayward Cloud (Tiānbiān yī duǒ yún)	Tsai Ming-Liang
2008	**The Edge of Heaven** (Auf der anderen Seite)	Fatih Akın
2008	12:08 East of Bucharest (A fost sau n-a fost?)	Corneliu Porumboiu
2008	Curse of the Golden Flower (Man cheng jin dai huang jin jia)	Zhang Yimou
2008	The Diving Bell and the Butterfly (Le scaphandre et le papillon)	Julian Schnabel
2008	The Host (Goemul)	Bong Joon-ho
2009	**Hunger**	Steve McQueen
2009	Before the Devil Knows You're Dead	Sidney Lumet
2009	Gomorrah (Gomorra)	Matteo Garrone
2009	There Will Be Blood	Paul Thomas Anderson
2009	Two Lovers	James Gray

=== 2010s ===
Year	Film	Director
2010	**Antichrist**	Lars von Trier
2010	A Prophet (Un prophète)	Jacques Audiard
2010	Fish Tank	Andrea Arnold
2010	Il Divo	Paolo Sorrentino
2010	Still Walking (Aruitemo aruitemo)	Hirokazu Kore-eda
2011	**A Single Man**	Tom Ford
2011	Another Year	Mike Leigh
2011	Fantastic Mr. Fox	Wes Anderson
2011	Mother (Madeo)	Bong Joon-ho
2011	Poetry (Shi)	Lee Chang-dong
2012	**The Artist**	Michel Hazanavicius
2012	A Separation (Jodái-e Náder az Simin)	Asghar Farhadi
2012	Drive	Nicolas Winding Refn
2012	Essential Killing	Jerzy Skolimowski
2012	Winter's Bone	Debra Granik
2013	**Beasts of the Southern Wild**	Benh Zeitlin
2013	Ernest & Celestine (Ernest et Célestine)	Benjamin Renner, Vincent Patar, Stéphane Aubier
2013	Killer Joe	William Friedkin
2013	Take Shelter	Jeff Nichols
2013	Shame	Steve McQueen
2014	**Mud**	Jeff Nichols
2014	Blue Is the Warmest Colour (La Vie d'Adèle – Chapitres 1 & 2)	Abdellatif Kechiche
2014	Spring Breakers	Harmony Korine
2014	The Great Beauty (La grande bellezza)	Paolo Sorrentino
2014	A Coffee in Berlin (Oh Boy!)	Jan Ole Gerster
2015	**Timbuktu**	Abderrahmane Sissako
2015	Boyhood	Richard Linklater
2015	The Grand Budapest Hotel	Wes Anderson
2015	Gett: The Trial of Viviane Amsalem (Gett, le procès de Viviane Amsalem)	Ronit Elkabetz and Shlomi Elkabetz
2015	Stations of the Cross (Kreuzweg)	Dietrich Brüggemann
2016	**Son of Saul** (Saul Fia)	László Nemes
2016	The Lobster	Yorgos Lanthimos
2016	Mad Max: Fury Road	George Miller
2016	Mustang	Deniz Gamze Ergüven
2016	Whiplash	Damien Chazelle
2017	**Carol**	Todd Haynes
2017	Frantz	François Ozon
2017	Hell or High Water	David Mackenzie
2017	Paterson	Jim Jarmusch
2017	Truman	Cesc Gay
2018	**Loveless** (Nelyubov)	Andrey Zvyagintsev
2018	A Fantastic Woman (Una mujer fantástica)	Sebastián Lelio
2018	Get Out	Jordan Peele
2018	Lady Macbeth	William Oldroyd
2018	Manchester by the Sea	Kenneth Lonergan
2019	**Cold War** (Zimna wojna)	Paweł Pawlikowski
2019	The Florida Project	Sean Baker
2019	Roma	Alfonso Cuarón
2019	Three Billboards Outside Ebbing, Missouri	Martin McDonagh
2019	Woman at War (Kona fer í stríð)	Benedikt Erlingsson

=== 2020s ===
Year	Film	Director
2020	**Never Look Away** (Werk ohne Autor)	Florian Henckel von Donnersmarck
2020	Joker	Todd Phillips
2020	Marriage Story	Noah Baumbach
2020	Les Misérables	Ladj Ly
2020	Parasite (기생충)	Bong Joon-ho
2021	**1917**	Sam Mendes
2021	A Hidden Life	Terrence Malick
2021	Jojo Rabbit	Taika Waititi
2021	La Llorona	Jayro Bustamante
2021	Little Women	Greta Gerwig
2022	**The Worst Person in the World** (Verdens verste menneske)	Joachim Trier
2022	Dear Comrades! (Dorogie tovarishchi!)	Andrei Konchalovsky
2022	Josep	Aurel
2022	Nomadland	Chloé Zhao
2022	The Power of the Dog	Jane Campion
2023	**Vortex**	Gaspar Noé
2023	Close	Lukas Dhont
2023	Drive My Car (Doraibu Mai Kā)	Ryūsuke Hamaguchi
2023	EO	Jerzy Skolimowski
2023	Triangle of Sadness	Ruben Östlund
2024	**The Quiet Girl** (An Cailín Ciúi)	Colm Bairéad
2024	Anatomy of a Fall (Anatomie d'une chute)	Justine Triet
2024	Babylon	Damien Chazelle
2024	The Blue Caftan (Le Bleu du caftan)	Maryam Touzani
2024	Perfect Days	Wim Wenders
2025	**The Zone of Interest**	Jonathan Glazer
2025	Emilia Pérez	Jacques Audiard
2025	Love Lies Bleeding	Rose Glass
2025	Poor Things	Yorgos Lanthimos
2025	The Teachers' Lounge (Das Lehrerzimmer)	İlker Çatak
2026	**Black Dog** (Gou Zhen)	Guan Hu
2026	Nino	Pauline Loquès
2026	Resurrection (Kuángyě Shídài)	Bi Gan
2026	Sentimental Value (Affeksjonsverdi)	Joachim Trier
2026	The Voice of Hind Rajab (Ṣawt Hind Rajab)	Kaouther Ben Hania
