= L'Invitation au voyage =

L'Invitation au voyage may refer to:

- L'Invitation au voyage, a poem by Charles Baudelaire in his collection Les Fleurs du mal
- L'Invitation au voyage, any of several musical settings of Baudelaire's poem, including ones by Henri Duparc and Emmanuel Chabrier
- L'Invitation au voyage, a 1927 French silent film directed by Germaine Dulac
- Invitation au voyage, a 1982 French film directed by Peter Del Monte
- L'Invitation au voyage, 2005 French documentary television series about Palestinian poet Mahmoud Darwish and Israeli novelist Aharon Applefeld
