= Claus Bantzer =

German composer

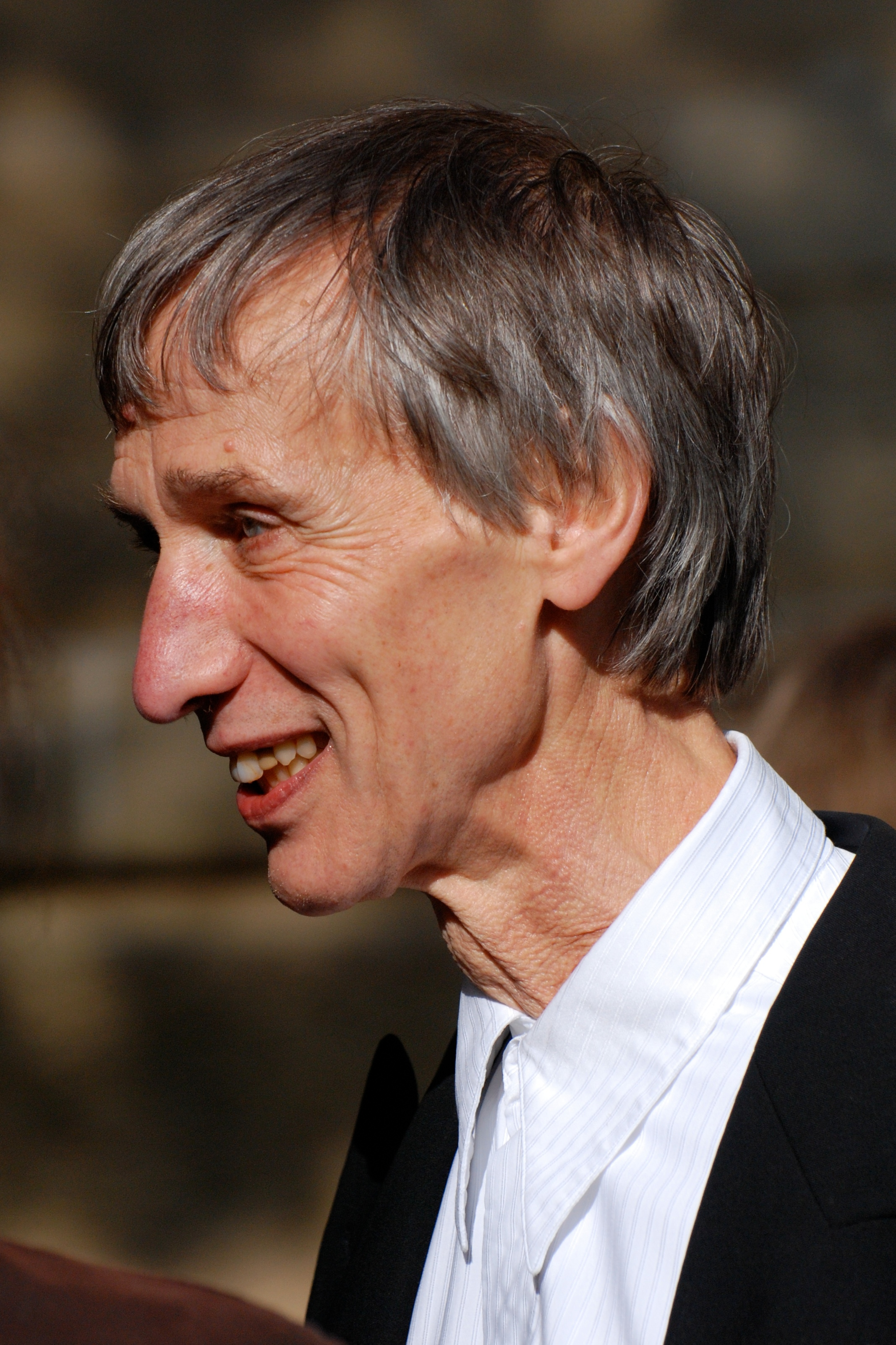
- Born: 10 October 1942 (age 83); Marburg, Hesse, Germany
- Occupations: Church musician; composer; director
- Relatives: Christoph Bantzer (brother)

Claus Bantzer (born 10 October 1942 in Marburg) is a German church musician, composer and director.

== Life and work ==
Claus Bantzer was born in Marburg in 1942 into an artist's family. His older brother Christoph Bantzer is an actor.

Bantzer began studying piano, organ, and conducting at the music school of the university of Frankfurt am Main. He continued his studies in Hamburg (Hochschule für Musik und Theater), where he became a master student of the organ teacher Heinz Wunderlich. He was also Wunderlich's assistant at the church St. Jacobi in Hamburg.

Since 1975, Bantzer has been organist at the church of St. Johannis Harvestehude in Hamburg. Later, the honorary title of Kirchenmusikdirektor was conferred onto him. At this church, he leads two choirs, the main church choir of St. Johannis and the chamber choir Harvestehuder Kammerchor, which he founded.

As a composer of music for more than 20 films, he has worked closely the film directors Peter Lilienthal, Doris Dörrie, Jan Schütte and Tevfik Başer. Apart from his compositions for film, he has also composed other works, usually combining religious lyrics with modern music, in particular jazz.

== Film music composed by Bantzer ==
- The Uprising (1980)
- Geburt der Hexe (1980)
- Dear Mr. Wonderful (1982)
- Das Wagnis des Arnold Janssen (1983)
- In the Belly of the Whale (1985)
- Men... (1985)
- 40 Quadratmeter Deutschland (1986)
- Paradise (1986)
- The Silence of the Poet (1986)
- Adrian und die Römer (1987)
- Dragon Chow (1987)
- Wann, wenn nicht jetzt (1987, TV)
- Der Radfahrer von San Cristóbal (1988)
- Farewell to False Paradise (1989)
- Winckelmann's Travels (1990)
- Nach Patagonien (1991)
- Lebewohl, Fremde (1991)
- Bye Bye America (1994)
- Wasserman – Der singende Hund (1995, TV) based on the children's book Wasserman by Yoram Kaniuk
- Angesichts der Wälder (1996)
- Cherry Blossoms (2008)

== Other compositions - selection ==
- time before – time after, composed together with Stephan Krause for strings and percussion (2007)
- Liebe ist nichts, sie wachse denn zuhöchst, composition for viola, chamber choir and percussion group based on a text by Paul Valéry (2002)
- Tu deinen Mund auf für die Stummen, Jazz-cantata, original performance in 1993 by the choir of the Northern German Television (NDR)
- Missa Popularis/Jazz Messe, original performance during the NDR Jazz-Workshop held in November 1980

== Works on CD - selection ==
- Claus Bantzer: Missa Popularis, Jazz-Messe, live recording made on 16 June 2001, director Claus Bantzer, Arte Nova (Sony BMG) 2001.
- Es kommt ein Schiff, geladen..., Christmas music named after the hymn, Harvestehuder Kammerchor, director Claus Bantzer, Arte Nova (Sony BMG) 2000.
- Das Hohelied Salomos, collection of love songs, Harvestehuder Kammerchor, director Claus Bantzer, Arte Nova (Sony BMG) 1999.
- Samsara, organ improvisations by Claus Bantzer, Arte Nova (Sony BMG) 1998.
- Chormusik der Romantik, Harvestehuder Kammerchor, director Claus Bantzer, Arte Nova (Sony BMG) 1997.
- Mariengesänge, Harvestehuder Kammerchor, director Claus Bantzer, Arte Nova (Sony BMG) 1996.

== Honours ==
- 2004 Member of the Hamburg Academy of Fine Arts (Freie Akademie der Künste in Hamburg)
- 2001 Max-Brauer-Preis in Hamburg
- 1994 Prix de la Sacem of the Jewish-Israeli Film festival in France
- 1987 Bantzer received the highest honour in German cinema at the Bundesfilmpreis, where the Filmband in Gold was conferred upon him in the category film music for 40m2 Deutschland, Paradies and Das Schweigen des Dichters
