= Winckelmann's Travels =

1990 film

- Directed by: Jan Schütte
- Written by: Jan Schütte; Thomas Strittmatter
- Starring: Wolf-Dietrich Sprenger; Susanne Lothar
- Cinematography: Sophie Maintigneux
- Edited by: Renate Merck
- Music by: Claus Bantzer
- Release date: 1990
- Country: West Germany
- Language: German

Winckelmann's Travels (German: Winckelmanns Reisen) is a 1990 German drama film co-written and directed by Jan Schütte. It premiered at the 47th edition of the Venice Film Festival, in the Venice International Film Critics' Week sidebar.

== Cast ==
- Wolf-Dietrich Sprenger as Ernst Winckelmann
- Susanne Lothar as Aline Maas
- Traugott Buhre as Vater Maas
- Udo Samel as Rüdiger
- Mine-Marei Wiegandt as Rosa
- Mathias Gnädinger as Berner
- Jan Biczycki as Niederzu
- Axel Milberg as Wöhler

== Reception ==
A contemporary Variety review noted that "Schutte’s new film isn't as appealing as his first feature, the amiable Dragon Chow", "has a modest charm, but it’s pretty slight material" and "shows a director with a special, sensitive talent". La Stampa's film critic Piero Zanotto praised the film, which "seems an almost intangible little thing, made of nothing. Instead, its narrative mechanisms works very smoothly and the psychologies are all very well focused" and the film is "beautiful because it is sincere, built around characters with whom each of us can identify". Harry Rowohlt from Die Zeit described the film as "beautifully sad".
