= Katherine Scholes =

Australian writer

- Born: Katherine Anne Scholes; 1959 (age 66–67); Dodoma Region, Tanzania
- Occupation: Novelist
- Writing career
- Language: English
- Years active: 1985-
- Notable work: The Blue Chameleon
- Notable awards: 1990 New South Wales Premier's Literary Awards, winner

Katherine Anne Scholes (born 5 July 1959) is an Australian writer.

She was born on 5 July 1959 in the Dodoma Region of Tanzania where her parents were English missionaries, and spent most of her childhood there before moving to England and then Tasmania, where she currently lives.

Scholes is the author of the international bestsellers Make Me An Idol, The Rain Queen and The Stone Angel. She has also written several children's books including the acclaimed Peacetimes, The Boy and the Whale and a young adult novel The Blue Chameleon, which won a New South Wales State Literary Award. Her books have been translated into numerous languages. Scholes has also worked in the film industry.

Her husband was the filmmaker Roger Scholes (1950–2022).

== Bibliography ==
=== Novels ===
- The Boy and the Whale (1987)
- The Landing: A Night of Birds (1989)
- The Blue Chameleon (1989)
- Make Me an Idol (1996)
- The Rain Queen (2000)
- The Stone Angel (2006)
- The Hunter's Wife (2009)
- Lioness (2011)
- The Perfect Wife (2013)
- Congo Dawn (2016)
- The Beautiful Mother (2020)
- One Night at Silverlake (2026)

=== Picture books ===
- Peacetime with Robert Ingpen (illustrator) (2019)

=== Poetry ===
- We the Earth (1995)

== Awards and recognition ==
- 1990 New South Wales Premier's Literary Awards, winner
- 2025 Entered on the Tasmanian Honour Roll of Women for "service to arts or media; literature and education"
