= The Farewell (2000 film) =

2000 film

- Film poster
- German: Abschied - Brechts letzter Sommer
- Directed by: Jan Schütte
- Written by: Klaus Pohl
- Produced by: Gesche Carstens; Hendryk Romanovski; Jan Schütte
- Starring: Josef Bierbichler
- Cinematography: Edward Kłosiński
- Edited by: Risa Kes
- Music by: John Cale
- Release date: 14 September 2000
- Running time: 91 minutes
- Country: Germany
- Language: German

The Farewell (German: Abschied - Brechts letzter Sommer) is a 2000 German drama film directed by Jan Schütte. It was screened in the Un Certain Regard section at the 2000 Cannes Film Festival.

== Cast ==
- Josef Bierbichler - Bertolt Brecht
- Monica Bleibtreu - Helene Weigel
- Jeanette Hain - Käthe Reichel
- Elfriede Irrall - Elisabeth Hauptmann
- Margit Rogall - Ruth Berlau
- Samuel Finzi - Wolfgang Harich
- Rena Zednikova - Isot Kilian
- Birgit Minichmayr - Barbara Brecht
- Tilman Günther - Offizier der Staatssicherheit
- Paul Herwig - Manfred Wekwerth
- Claudius Freyer - Peter Palitzsch
- Emanuel Spitzy - Jungpionier
- Slawomir Holland - Offizier der Staatssicherheit
- Piotr Kryska - Fahrer der Staatssicherheit
