= Little Flames (film) =

1985 film

- Directed by: Peter Del Monte
- Starring: Dino Jaksic; Valeria Golino; Carlotta Wittig; Mario Garriba; Ulisse Minervini
- Cinematography: Tonino Nardi
- Edited by: Anna Rosa Napoli
- Music by: Riccardo Zappa
- Release date: 1985
- Running time: 95 minutes
- Country: Italy
- Language: Italian

Little Flames (Italian: Piccoli fuochi) is a 1985 Italian fantasy drama film directed by Peter Del Monte and starring Dino Jaksic and Valeria Golino in her very first leading role. Golino won a Globo d'oro for Best Breakthrough Actress for her performance in the film.

== Plot summary ==
The Italian childhood fantasy Little Flames (Piccoli Fuochi) concerns 5-year-old Tommaso (Dino Jaksic). Proving too much for his parents, Tommaso is often sent to his room, where he interacts with several bizarre "imaginary" playmates who bedevil the servants with their sadistic pranks (the audience is never certain whether the playmates are real or whether the boy is pulling off the pranks himself). Valeria Golino plays Mara, the family's new maid, whom Tommaso takes a liking to. He begs his playmates to leave Mara alone, but out of jealousy they plan an awful revenge on the poor woman.

== Cast ==
- Valeria Golino: Mara
- Dino Jaksic: Tommaso
- Ulisse Minervini: Franci
- Carlotta Wittig: Ada
- Mario Garriba: Leo
- Daniela Giordano:
- Simona Tedeschi:
