= Melita Jurisic =

Australian actress

- Born: Melita Jurišić; Croatia
- Occupations: Actress, singer-songwriter

Melita Jurisic is an Australian actress.

Jurisic was born in Croatia and migrated to Australia with her family at age five. She began her career as part of the Lighthouse Company (Playhouse) in Adelaide.

== Career ==
=== Screen, stage and music ===
Jurisic's screen roles include a lead (as Dr. Eva) in the ABC TV series Something in the Air, playing the title character in the 1987 film The Tale of Ruby Rose, the 1986 TV movie Hunger, Croatian film Transatlantik in 1998, 1997's The Sound of One Hand Clapping, Mad Max: Fury Road Bordertown and The Petrov Affair. She is also known for her role as Dr. Magda in the television series The Flying Doctors.

Her stage roles are numerous, and include Macbeth with the Sydney Theatre Company in 2014, I Am A Miracle at the Malthouse in 2015 and Three Sisters at the Sydney Opera House in 2001. Internationally she appeared in a number of Barrie Kosky's productions at Schauspielhaus Wien in Vienna, Austria, including Medea.

Jurisic is also the singer and songwriter of Viennese band Metalycée. Their first album "It Is Not" was voted one of the ten best Austrian albums of the decade.

== Filmography ==
=== Film ===
Year	Title	Role	Type
1986	Hunger	Ileana Radulesco	TV movie
1986	Twelfth Night	Part Guest	Feature film
1987	The Tale of Ruby Rose	Ruby Rose	Feature film
1991	A Woman's Tale	Judy (voice)	Feature film
1991	Get Real	Ms.Perkins	Short film
1993	Dead Water	Sally Lucena	Short film
1994	45 Dollars an Hour	Helen	Short film
1995	Fishing	Torturer	Short film
1995	One Such Night	Cleo	Short film
1997	The Sound of One Hand Clapping	Maria Buloh	Feature film
1998	I, Eugenia	Annie Birkett	Short film
1998	Transatlantik	Zorka	Feature film (Croatia)
2003	Einstein's Wife	Mileva Einstein (voice)	TV movie
2011	Kotlovina	Mimi	Feature film (Croatia)
2012	Dead Europe	Maria	Feature film
2015	Mad Max: Fury Road	The Vuvalini	Feature film
2018	Murer – Anatomy of a Trial	Rosa Segev	Feature film

=== Television ===
Year	Title	Role	Type
1981	I Can Jump Puddles	Violet	TV miniseries, 1 episode
1986	The Fast Lane	Maria	TV series, 1 episode
1986	Pokerface	Lou	TV miniseries, 3 episodes
1986	Land of Hope	Kathleen Quinn	TV miniseries
1990	The Flying Doctors	Dr Magda	TV series, 15 episodes
1995	Bordertown	Adrianna Leeuwen	TV miniseries, 10 episodes
1996	Mercury	Mrs Sumic	TV series, 1 episode
1997	The Petrov Affair	Nina Morozova	TV miniseries, 2 episodes
2000–02	Something in the Air	Dr Eva Petrovska	TV series, 148 episodes
2001	Blue Heelers	Paula Stanford	TV series, 1 episode
2008	Kosovo	Narrator	
2010	Mother Teresa - Saint of Darkness	Mother Teresa (voice)	

== Stage ==
Year	Title	Role	Type
	Lovers	Mag	Actors Theatre
	Don Juan	Charlotte	Actors Theatre
	Jack the Ripper	Polly	Actors Theatre, Melbourne
	Only an Orphan Girl	Femme Fatale	Actors Theatre, Melbourne
	The Roundsman	Policewoman	Actors Theatre, Melbourne
	Gigi	Gigi	Actors Theatre, Melbourne
	Fat King Melon	Princess Caraway	Actors Theatre, Melbourne
	The Adventures of a Bear Called Paddington	Judy Brown	Tour with Actors Theatre, Melbourne
	Images	Emily Brontë	Actors Theatre, Melbourne
	Schweik in the Second World War	Anna	Actors Theatre, Melbourne
1979	Once a Catholic	Mary	Russell Street Theatre with Melbourne Theatre Company
1982	Mother Courage and Her Children	Kattrin	Playhouse, Adelaide with STCSA
1982	Silver Lining	Yanova	Playhouse, Adelaide with STCSA
1982	The Prince of Homburg	Princess Natalia	Playhouse, Adelaide with STCSA
1982	Royal Show	Rebecca / IIvory / Faustine / Mrs Macpherson / Horsewoman	Playhouse, Adelaide with STCSA
1982–83	A Midsummer Night's Dream	Hermia	Playhouse, Adelaide, Keith Michell Theatre with STCSA
1983	Twelfth Night	Lady-In-Waiting / various	Playhouse, Adelaide with STCSA
1983	Blood Wedding	The Bride	Playhouse, Adelaide with STCSA
1983–84	Netherwood	Police Woman / Rhonda	Playhouse, Adelaide with STCSA, Seymour Centre
1983	The Marriage of Figaro	Fanchette	Playhouse, Adelaide with STCSA
1983	Pal Joey	Linda English	Playhouse, Adelaide with STCSA
1983	The Blind Giant Is Dancing	Janice Lang / Robin	Playhouse, Adelaide with STCSA
1983	Sunrise	Eva	Playhouse, Adelaide with STCSA
1984	The Women of March the First	Gesia	Nimrod Downstairs Theatre
1985, 1987	The Golden Age	Betsheb	Studio Theatre, Melbourne with Playbox Theatre Company, Seymour Centre with Nimrod Theatre Company
1985	A Spring Song	Kerry Dennison	Studio Theatre, Melbourne with Playbox Theatre Company
1986	If Winter Comes	Ilona	Church Theatre, Melbourne with Australian Contemporary Theatre Company
1987	Les Liaisons Dangereuses	Emilie	Seymour Centre with Nimrod Theatre Company
1988	My Sister in This House	Isabelle	Seymour Centre
1988	Capricornia	Christobel / Opal / Rhonda	Belvoir Street Theatre, Parramatta Cultural Centre, Darwin Performing Arts Centre, Canberra Theatre, World Expo 88 Brisbane
1989	A Doll’s House	Nora	Ensemble Theatre
1989	Picnic with Fatima	Fatima	Universal Theatre, Melbourne with Wintercourt Productions
1989	Nice Girls	Lizzy	Anthill Theatre, Melbourne, Monash University, Theatre Royal, Hobart with Playbox Theatre Company
1989	Hedda Gabler	Thea Elvsted	Playhouse Adelaide with STCSA
1990	Danny and the Deep Blue Sea	Roberta	Universal Two, Melbourne with Wintercourt Productions & Biartisan Productions
1991	Mad Forest	Angel / Doctor / Student / Dog / Toma / Rodica / Bogdan's Old Aunt	Russell Street Theatre with Melbourne Theatre Company
1991	Uncle Vanya	Sonya	Russell Street Theatre with Melbourne Theatre Company
1991	Bali: Adat	Bijang	Fairfax Studio with Melbourne Theatre Company for Melbourne International Arts Festival
1992	Quartet	Marquise de Merteuil	Goethe Institut, Malthouse Theatre, University of Adelaide for Adelaide Festival with Playbox Theatre Company
1992	The Crimson Island	Adelaide Karpovna / Betsy	Anthill Theatre, Melbourne, Royalty Theatre, Adelaide for Adelaide Festival
1992	The Idiot	Lebedev / Mrs Yepanchin / Mrs Ivolgin	Theatre Works, Melbourne
1992	Life is a Dream	Rosura	West Melbourne Gasworks with Anthill Theatre, Melbourne for Melbourne International Arts Festival
1993	Agamemnon: Dawn of the Darkness	Clytemnestra	IRAA Theatre, Melbourne
1993	Viva La Vida: Frida Kahlo	European Frida	West Melbourne Gasworks with Handspan Theatre
1993	Mother Courage and her Children	Kattrin	West Melbourne Gasworks with Anthill Theatre Company
1993	Faust	Gretchen / Helen of Troy	Russell Street Theatre with Melbourne Theatre Company
1993–94	King Lear	Cordelia / Oswald	Malthouse Theatre, Tokyo Globe Theatre, Aichi Arts Center, Nagoya, Japan, Seoul Arts Center, South Korea, His Majesty's Theatre, Perth, Canberra Theatre with Playbox Theatre Company
1994	Woyzeck a Good Murder, A Real Murder	Marie	Malthouse Theatre with IRAA Theatre, Melbourne for Castlemaine Festival
1994	Big Hair in America	Wanda	Wal Cherry Play of the Year '94
1994	Young Playwrights Festival		Anthill Theatre Company with Melbourne Theatre Company for Next Wave Festival
1994	On the North Diversion Road	Woman	Malthouse Theatre with Playbox Theatre Company for Melbourne International Arts Festival
1995	The Ham Funeral		Budinskis Theatre of Exile, Melbourne
1996	The Blue Hour	Grandmother	Odeon Theatre, Adelaide with IRAA Theatre, Melbourne for Adelaide Festival
1996	A Cheery Soul	Maid / Young Mrs Lillie / Mrs Wakeman	Playhouse, Melbourne with Melbourne Theatre Company
1996	The Blue Hour	Grandmother	IRAA Theatre, Melbourne, Adelaide Festival
1996	Solitary Animals	Boyana	Wharf Theatre with Sydney Theatre Company
1997	Intimate Letters	Kamila Stösslová / Narrator	Brisbane, Sydney, Melbourne with Musica Viva
1997	Dock 39		Theatre Works, Melbourne
1997	Tartuffe	Elmire	Sydney Opera House with Sydney Theatre Company
1998	Mourning Becomes Electra	Lavinia	Wharf Theatre with Sydney Theatre Company
1998	King Lear	Goneril	Playhouse, Canberra, Melbourne Athenaeum, Playhouse, QPAC Brisbane, Sydney Opera House with Bell Shakespeare
1999	Chilling and Killing My Annabel Lee	Angelica / Anne / Christine / Woman	Malthouse Theatre with Playbox Theatre Company
1999	The Dogs Play: And A Few Roos Loose in the Top Paddock	Ruby / Jenna	Malthouse Theatre with Playbox Theatre Company
1999	The Lover / The Collection	Sarah / Stella	Fairfax Studio, Melbourne with Melbourne Theatre Company
1999	The Language of the Gods	Eva de Ven	Malthouse Theatre with Playbox Theatre Company
2001	Medea	Medea	Vienna Schauspielhaus, Austria
2001	Three Sisters	Olga	Sydney Opera House with Sydney Theatre Company
2001	This Hospital is My Country	Elena	DeckChair Theatre, Perth
2002	Dafke!! (Part 1 of Jewtopia-Trilogie)	Girl with Broken Neck	Vienna Schauspielhaus, Austria, for Vienna Festival
2002	Macbeth	Macbeth	Vienna Schauspielhaus, Austria
2003	1975: A Populist Opera	Paula Risic	North Melbourne Town Hall with Melbourne Workers Theatre
2003	Falling Petals	Sarah Godden / Mrs. Woods / Gayle / Marg / Mrs. Lawrence	Malthouse Theatre with Playbox Theatre Company
2003–04	The Lost Breath (aka Der verlorene Atem (Part 2 of Jewtopia-Trilogie)	The Other Woman	Vienna Schauspielhaus, Austria, Melbourne Athenaeum with Melbourne International Arts Festival
2004	Kasimir + Karoline	Erna	Perchtoldsdorf Summer Festival, Austria
2003, 2007	Poppea	Poppea	Vienna Schauspielhaus, Austria, Berliner Ensemble 2004, Edinburgh Festival
2004	Wiener Lächelin	Widow	Vienna Schauspielhaus, Austria, Komische Oper Berlin
2005	Das Schloss (Part 3 of Jewtopia-Trilogie)	Blaubart	Vienna Schauspielhaus, Austria
2005	The Tales of Hoffmann (aka Hoffmanns Erzählungen)	Spalanzani / Shlemihl	Vienna Schauspielhaus, Austria, Grand Théâtre de Luxembourg
2006	Interpretationache 06		Graz Literature Festival, Austria
2006	The Caucasian Chalk Circle	11 roles	Vienna Schauspielhaus, Austria / Grand Théâtre de Luxembourg
2006	1975 - A Love Story	Paula	Brisbane
2007	The Ubu-Complex	Alfred Jarry	Vienna Schauspielhaus, Austria
2007	The Family Table III	Self	Vienna Festival, Austria
2007	Nach Der Zeit Im Takt Sehen	Woman	Off Limits Festival, Germany, WUK Vienna
2007	Rettet Die Mäuse (aka Save the Mice)	Mel Ostermayer	Tanzquartier Vienna, Austria
2007	Middentity	Mel	Nitra Festival, Slovakia
2008	The Women of Troy	Cassandra / Andromache / Helen of Troy	Wharf Theatre, Malthouse Theatre with Sydney Theatre Company
2009	Purimspil		Linz, Austria
2009	Das Tortenstück	Franz Fuchs	Donaufestival, Krems Austria
2009–10	Unerhoert	Conductor	Jeunesse, Linz, Vienna, Innsbruck, Austria
2009	Alma	Alma Mahler	Vienna, Austria
2009–10	In the Jungle of Cities (aka Im Dickicht Der Stadte)	Mae Garga	Landestheater, Linz, Austria
2011	Mater Dolorosa (aka Our Lady of Sorrows)	Mel	Progetto Semiserio, Vienna, Austria
2011	Lysistrata	Lampito	Perchtoldsdorf Summer Festival, Austria
2013	Slobodija Odysseia, Mon Amour	Penelope	Marseille, France
2014	Macbeth	Lady Macbeth	Sydney Theatre Company
2014	Night on Bald Mountain	Mrs. Sword	Malthouse Theatre
2015	Suddenly Last Summer	Miss Foxhill	Sydney Opera House with Sydney Theatre Company
2015	The Wizard of Oz	Scarecrow	Belvoir Street Theatre
2015	I Am a Miracle	Johannes / Woman / Angel	Malthouse Theatre
2016	Yes Move. No Move (Moved?)		Manchester UK, Ljubljana Slovenia, Prague Czech Republic, Sibiu Romania with BeSpectACTive!
2017	John	Genevieve Marduk	Arts Centre Melbourne with Melbourne Theatre Company
2017	Three Sisters	Anfisus	Sydney Opera House with Sydney Theatre Company
2018	The House of Bernarda Alba	Bernadette	Fairfax Studio with Melbourne Theatre Company
2019	Arbus and West	Mae West	Fairfax Studio with Melbourne Theatre Company
2019	Titus Andronicus	Tamora	Sydney Opera House with Bell Shakespeare

== Awards and nominations ==
Year	Nominated work	Award	Category	Result
1987	The Tale of Ruby Rose	Venice Film Festival	International Critics Prize for Best Actress	Won
1989	A Doll’s House	Inaugural Cladan Award	Most Significant Contribution to Sydney Theatre	Won
1989	Picnic with Fatima	Green Room Awards	for Best Actress	Nominated
1990	Danny and the Deep Blue Sea	Green Room Awards	Best Actress	Won
1991	Bali Adat	Green Room Awards	Best Actress in a Supporting Role	Won
1992	Mother Courage	Green Room Awards	Best Actress in a Supporting Role	Nominated}
1998	King Lear	Green Room Awards	Best Actress in a Leading Role	Nominated
2008	Women of Troy	Sydney Theatre Awards	Best Actress	Nominated}
2015	Night on Bald Mountain	Green Room Awards	Best Female Actor	Won
2016	I Am a Miracle	Green Room Awards	Best Female Actor	Won
2017	John	Green Room Awards	Best Female Actor	Nominated
2017	John	Helpmann Awards	Best Female Actor in a Supporting Role	Nominated
