= Comedy! =

- Directed by: Jacques Doillon
- Written by: Jacques Doillon; Jean-François Goyet; Denis Ferraris
- Produced by: Alain Sarde
- Starring: Jane Birkin; Alain Souchon
- Cinematography: William Lubtchansky
- Edited by: Catherine Quesemand
- Music by: Philippe Sarde
- Distributed by: Sarah CDF Films
- Release date: 1987
- Country: France
- Language: French

Comedy! (French: Comédie !) is a 1987 French drama film written and directed by Jacques Doillon.

The film was entered into the main competition at the 44th edition of the Venice Film Festival.

== Cast ==
- Jane Birkin as Her
- Alain Souchon as Him
