= Love and Fear (film) =

1988 drama film

- Film poster
- Directed by: Margarethe von Trotta
- Written by: Anton Chekhov (play, Three Sisters); Dacia Maraini; Margarethe von Trotta
- Produced by: Romano Cardarelli
- Starring: Fanny Ardant; Greta Scacchi; Valeria Golino
- Cinematography: Giuseppe Lanci
- Edited by: Enzo Meniconi
- Music by: Franco Piersanti
- Distributed by: BAC Films
- Release date: 19 April 1988
- Running time: 112 minutes
- Countries: West Germany; France; Italy
- Language: German

Love and Fear (also known as Three Sisters; German: Fürchten und Lieben, Italian: Paura e amore, French: Trois Soeurs) is a 1988 drama film directed by Margarethe von Trotta. It was entered into the 1988 Cannes Film Festival.

== Cast ==
- Fanny Ardant as Velia
- Greta Scacchi as Maria
- Valeria Golino as Sandra Parini
- Peter Simonischek as Massimo
- Sergio Castellitto as Roberto
- Agnès Soral as Sabrina
- Jan Biczycki as Cecchini
- Paolo Hendel as Federico
- Ralph Schicha as Nicole
- Gila von Weitershausen as Erika
- Giampiero Bianchi as Giacomo
- Giovanni Colombo as Marco
- Guido Alberti as Baretti
- Beniamino Placido as Savagnoni
