= The Tale of Ruby Rose =

- Film poster
- Directed by: Roger Scholes
- Written by: Roger Scholes
- Produced by: Bryce Menzies; Andrew Wiseman
- Starring: Melita Jurisic; Chris Haywood; Rod Zuanic; Sheila Florance; Martyn Sanderson
- Cinematography: Steve Mason
- Edited by: Roger Scholes
- Music by: Paul Schütze
- Production company: Seon Films
- Release dates: 1 September 1987 (Venice Film Festival); 18 August 1988 (Australia)
- Running time: 100 minutes
- Country: Australia
- Language: English
- Budget: AU$1.2 million

The Tale of Ruby Rose is a 1988 Australian drama film written and directed by Roger Scholes, produced by Andrew Wiseman and Bryce Menzies, and starring Melita Jurisic, Chris Haywood, Rod Zuanic, Sheila Florance, and Martyn Sanderson.

== Synopsis ==
In the 1930s, amidst the wild and isolated wilderness of the Tasmanian highlands, Ruby Rose is overcome by her fear of darkness. Ruby cries out to the elemental spirits that surround her. She is driven to take a harrowing journey out of the mountains to seek help from her lost grandmother.

== Cast ==
- Melita Jurisic as Ruby Rose
- Chris Haywood as Henry Rose
- Rod Zuanic as Gem
- Sheila Florance as Grandma
- Martyn Sanderson as Bennett
- Sheila Kennelly as Cook
- John McKelvey as Tasker
- Wilkie Collins as Father
- Nell Dobson as Mrs. Bennett
- Terry Garcia as Vassi
- Marie-Rose Jones as Singer
- Graham Davis as Town Man

== Production ==
As the title indicates, the film centres on Ruby and her complex emotions. The character is based on a story told to Roger Scholes by an old woman, Mrs. Miles of Mole Creek Valley. As a young woman, she had lived alone in a hut in the Highlands for four years, without knowing that her husband had died while trying to get back to her in the middle of winter. The experience traumatised her.

Scholes was also interested in the naïve art created by people with mental disturbance or trauma, and its similarities with prehistoric art (he studied case histories as a student in Melbourne). That is why Ruby fills notebooks with her own drawings. She is much younger than her husband Henry, and she was traumatised as a child. She has created her own cosmology, based on fear and observation of the natural world. She feels safe only in the day. When Henry and Gem go off trapping for days on end, she is alone with her fears in the hut. She identifies the colour white with the sun, warmth and light; that is why she uses flour to make her face white. By this stage in the movie, the audience is fully aware of Ruby's mental instability and her terror of the dark. That is why her journey is so remarkable: to be out after dark requires a supreme act of will.

Roger Scholes was interested in the way that isolation had shaped women's lives in this region. In the late 1970s, when he was researching, he met and photographed many people who had lived all their lives in the harsh environment of the Tasmanian Highlands. He was preparing a book based on the interviews and photographs, but it was never completed. He decided to turn the material into a feature film instead. The Tale of Ruby Rose was Scholes' first and only feature film; he concentrated largely on documentary work after its release.

== Release ==
The film was screened widely at festivals throughout the world, including the 44th Venice International Film Festival, where it was shown in competition for the Golden Lion. In addition, Melita Jurisic won the Francesco Pasinetti Award for Best Actress at the festival, while Scholes received the Elvira Notari Prize for his directorial work.

The Tale of Ruby Rose was nominated for three AACTA Awards (Best Film, Best Director and Best Original Music Score), with Paul Schütze winning for Best Original Music Score.

== See also ==
- Cinema of Australia
