= My Case =

- Directed by: Manoel de Oliveira
- Written by: Jacques Parsi; Manoel de Oliveira; Samuel Beckett (prose); José Régio (play)
- Produced by: Paulo Branco
- Starring: Luís Miguel Cintra; Bulle Ogier; Axel Bogousslavsky
- Cinematography: Mário Barroso
- Edited by: Rudolfo Wedeles
- Release date: 1986
- Running time: 92 minutes
- Countries: France; Portugal
- Language: French

My Case (French: Mon cas, Portuguese: O meu caso) is a 1986 drama-fantasy film directed by Manoel de Oliveira. It entered the main competition at the 43rd Venice International Film Festival. The film is based on the play of the same name by José Régio, but also on the Book of Job as well as texts by Samuel Beckett.

== Cast ==
- Bulle Ogier as Actrice # 1
- Luís Miguel Cintra as L'Intrus
- Axel Bogousslavsky as L'Employé
- Fred Personne as L'Auteur
- Wladimir Ivanovsky as Le spectateur
- Héloïse Mignot as Actrice # 2
- Grégoire Oestermann as Le projectionniste
