= Bordertown (Australian TV series) =

1995 Australian TV miniseries

- Genre: Drama
- Starring: Mitchell Butel; Linda Cropper; Melita Jurisic; Alex Menglet; Joe Petruzzi; Christine Tremarco; Hugo Weaving; Petru Gheorghiu; Geoff Morrell; Kim Hillas; Norman Kaye; Ray Barrett; Peta Toppano
- Music by: Guy Gross
- Country of origin: Australia
- Original language: English
- No. of seasons: 1

Original release
- Release: 4 October – 6 December 1995

Bordertown is a 1995 Australian TV miniseries set in 1952 in a refugee camp located in a dusty, remote Australian town called Baringa. The story depicts a year in the lives of the camp residents, displaced persons from World War II who are learning English and awaiting jobs and new lives in Australia. The series stars Hugo Weaving as an English teacher and also features Cate Blanchett in a smaller role as an albino Italian migrant.

== Reception ==
The series was somewhat controversial for its depiction of life in the migrant camps, and its ratings were not high. Commenting on the 2002 video release, Video Store magazine noted the "inconsistent tone" of the episodes but thought that ultimately, the viewer would become "accustomed to, and fond of, these characters and their microcosm in the middle of nowhere". DVD Talk noted the series' "original setting and generally solid acting" but found the show only "mildly interesting".

The miniseries received the AWGIE Award for Mini-Series Original in 1996.

== Castt and characters ==
- Mitchell Butel as Nino Della Vergine
- Linda Cropper as Bev Stafford
- Melita Jurisic as Adrianna Leeuwen
- Alex Menglet as Mihaly Bassa
- Joe Petruzzi as Joe Della Vergine
- Christine Tremarco as Louise Pearson
- Hugo Weaving as Kenneth Pearson
- Petru Gheorghiu as Dante
- Geoff Morrell as Bates
- Kim Hillas as Maeve
- Norman Kaye as Pieter Leeuwen
- Ray Barrett as Colonel Forsythe
- Peta Toppano as Diomira
- Robert Mammone as Cesere
- Lucky Grills as Wishart
