= The Silence of the Poet =

- Directed by: Peter Lilienthal
- Written by: Peter Lilienthal
- Produced by: Edgar Reitz
- Starring: Jakov Lind
- Cinematography: Justus Pankau
- Edited by: Siegrun Jäger
- Music by: Claus Bantzer
- Release date: 1986
- Language: German

The Silence of the Poet (German: Das Schweigen des Dichters) is a 1986 West German drama film written and directed by Peter Lilienthal. It premiered at the 43rd Venice International Film Festival.

== Cast ==
- Jakov Lind as Joram
- Len Ramras as Gideon

- Daniel Kedem as Gideon as a child

- Towje Kleiner as Fayermann
- Gudrun Weichenhan as Naomi
- Vladimir Weigl as Avi
- Barbara Kwiatkowska-Lass as Janina
- Ya'ackov Ben-Sira as Schiffrin
- Peter Freistadt as Dr. Marx

== Production ==
The film is based on the novella The Continuing Silence of a Poet by A. B. Yehoshua. It was shot in Israel.

== Release ==
The film was entered into the main competition at the 43rd edition of the Venice Film Festival.

== Reception ==
The film won the Silver Band Award as well as the awards for best director and best composer at the 37th German Film Awards. Variety described it as "a gentle, atmospheric film" with "a lively editing style". The San Francisco Chronicle called it "a suble, poetic film [...] marked by a delicacy of approach that is rare in today's film world".
