= A Tale of Love =

- Directed by: Francesco Maselli
- Written by: Francesco Maselli; Fiore De Rienzo
- Produced by: Carlo Tuzii
- Starring: Valeria Golino; Livio Panieri; Blas Roca-Rey
- Cinematography: Maurizio Dell'Orco
- Music by: Giovanna Marini
- Release date: 1986
- Country: Italy
- Language: Italian

Storia d'amore, internationally released as A Tale of Love and Love Story, is a 1986 Italian romantic drama film directed by Francesco Maselli. It entered the 43rd Venice International Film Festival, in which it won the Special Jury Prize and the Volpi Cup for best actress (to Valeria Golino).

== Cast ==
- Valeria Golino as Bruna Assecondati
- Blas Roca-Rey as Sergio
- Livio Panieri as Mario
- Luigi Diberti as Father of Bruna
- Gabriella Giorgelli as Mother of Sergio
