= Barrie Kosky =

Australian theatre and opera director (born 1967)

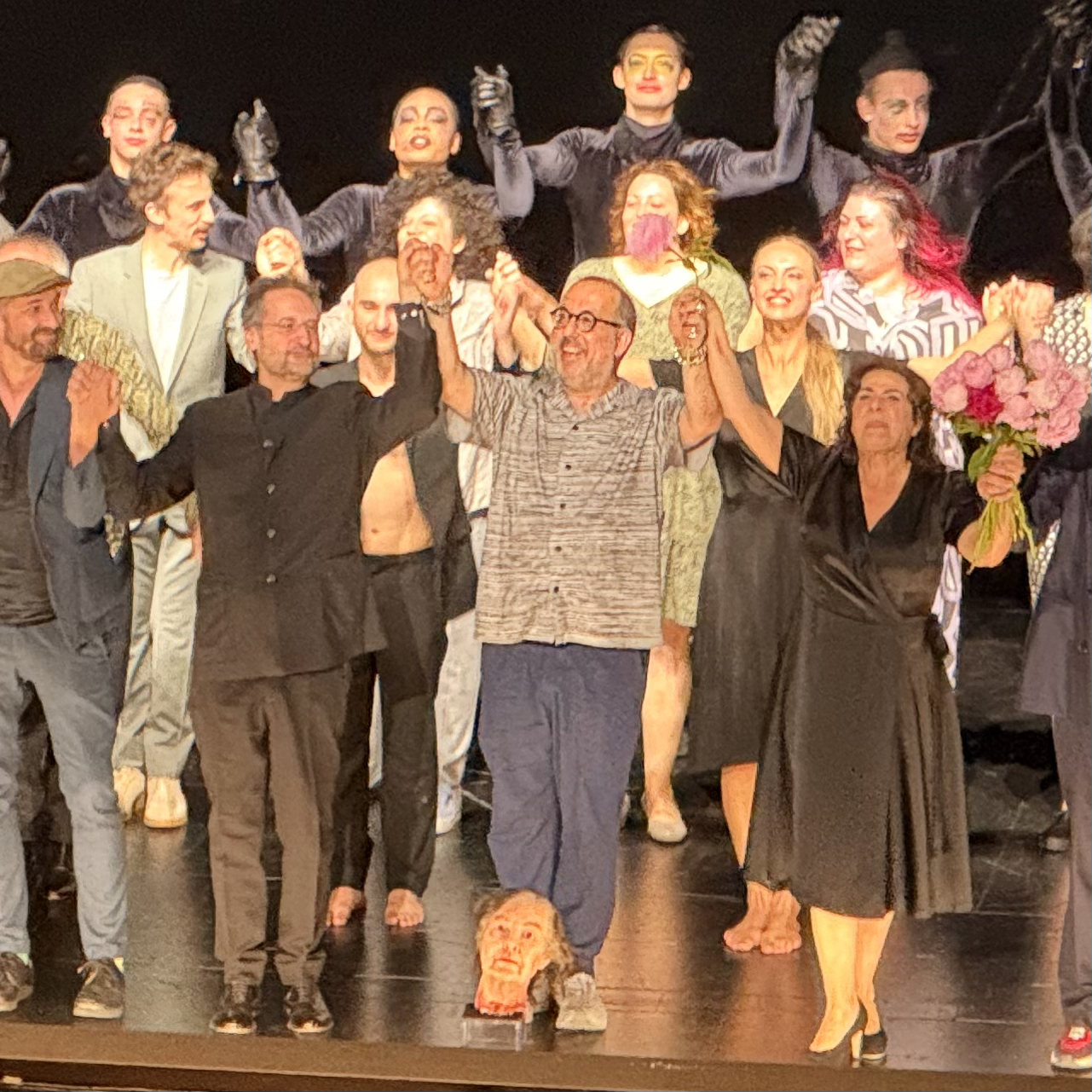
- Barrie Kosky on stage, behind the severed head of Orpheus.
- Born: 18 February 1967 (age 59); Melbourne, Australia
- Education: University of Melbourne
- Occupations: Theatre director; Opera director
- Organizations: Komische Oper Berlin
- Awards: International Opera Awards

Barrie Kosky (Note: Barrie Kosky's name is sometimes misspelled as Barry Kosky, Barrie Koski, Barrie Koskie.) (born 18 February 1967) is an Australian theatre and opera director. (Note: Kosky also plays the piano, as he did in his production of Monteverdi's Poppea) Based at the Komische Oper Berlin, he has worked internationally.

== Biography ==
Kosky was born in Melbourne, the grandson of Jewish emigrants from Europe. He attended Melbourne Grammar School where he performed in Brecht's The Resistible Rise of Arturo Ui in 1981, Shakespeare's Othello in 1982, and later directed his first play. Among many other later famous Australian artists, he also worked at the St Martins Youth Arts Centre. In 1985, he then began studies in piano and music history at the University of Melbourne. In 1988, he directed there at the Union Theatre Mozart's Don Giovanni and Frank Wedekind's The Lulu Plays, Earth Spirit and Pandora's Box.

== Career ==
In 1989, Kosky directed the Australian premiere of Michael Tippett's The Knot Garden (reduced version) at the Melbourne Spoleto Festival. He also directed Alban Berg's Lulu at the same festival. In 1990, he formed the Gilgul Theatre (Note: At the Gilgul, Kosky worked with the set designer Peter Corrigan on many productions; this collaboration continued later, e.g. on Oedipus Rex, Nabucco, Lear.) which staged The Exile Trilogy in 1993 (The Dybbuk, Es Brent, Levad) at the Belvoir St Theatre; Kosky was artistic director of the Gilgul Theatre until 1997. Other notable productions with the Gilgul Theatre were The Wilderness Room and a stage adaptation of The Operated Jew.

For the Victorian State Opera, Kosky directed Mozart's The Marriage of Figaro and Rossini's The Barber of Seville in 1991. In 1993, he directed the season premiere of Larry Sitsky's opera The Golem for Opera Australia, which was also released on ABC Classics. Also in 1993, he directed Goethe's Faust I and II for the Melbourne Theatre Company, and Stravinsky's Oedipus Rex for Opera Queensland.

In 1996, he directed Verdi's Nabucco (recorded on DVD by ABC Television) and Wagner's The Flying Dutchman for Opera Australia, a work which he revisited in 2006 at the Aalto-Musiktheater in Essen, Germany. Also in 1996, Kosky was appointed director of the Adelaide Festival, at 29 years the youngest person ever in that position. Following that appointment, the 50-minute documentary Kosky in Paradise examined his ideas and creative motivations.

In 1997, he directed Molière's Tartuffe in Christopher Hampton's translation at the Sydney Theatre Company (STC). In 1998, he directed Mourning Becomes Electra for the STC, and Shakespeare's King Lear for the Bell Shakespeare company's touring production. In 1999, Kosky directed Alban Berg's Wozzeck for the Sydney Opera House. In 2000, Kosky directed Ted Hughes' adaption of Seneca's Oedipus at the Sydney Theatre Company.

From 2001 to 2005, Kosky was co-director of the Schauspielhaus Wien in Vienna. There he directed Euripides' Medea with the Australian actress Melita Jurisic; (Note: Jurisic also played in Kosky's Poppea and many others of his productions.) the production was nominated for the Nestroy Theatre Prize. He also directed there Monteverdi's L'incoronazione di Poppea, in which he inserted songs by Cole Porter. He directed Offenbach's The Tales of Hoffmann, Shakespeare's Macbeth in an all-female version, (Note: Kosky had staged a Macbeth during his university years in Melbourne with Libbi Gorr in the title role.) and Boulevard Delirium with Paul Capsis which toured around the world for several seasons, including Australia where it won a 2006 Helpmann Award. His 2003 staging of Monteverdi's L'Orfeo at the Innsbrucker Festwochen für Alte Musik conducted by René Jacobs was shown at the Berlin State Opera in 2007 and broadcast by arte. Also in 2005, Kosky directed Wagner's Lohengrin for the Vienna State Opera.

In 2006, he directed Tom Wright's (Note: Kosky and Tom Wright have worked together on several projects; their collaboration started when both where at Melbourne University.) eight-hour play The Lost Echo –based on Ovid's Metamorphoses and Euripides' The Bacchae– for the Actors Company at the STC; the play won five Helpmann Awards. In the same year, Kosky directed in Germany Der fliegende Holländer at the Aalto-Musiktheater and Britten's Midsummer Night's Dream at the Theater Bremen.

In 2007, Kosky presented his Vienna production of L'incoronazione di Poppea at the 2007 Edinburgh Festival. In that year, he also directed Britten's Peter Grimes for the Staatsoper Hannover, and Wagner's Tristan und Isolde for the Aalto-Musiktheater which received a nomination for the Faust Award.

In January 2008, he directed at the same house Rise and Fall of the City of Mahagonny. In April 2008, Kosky was participant in the "Towards a Creative Australia" stream at the Australia 2020 Summit. In July 2008 he directed the premiere of Liza Lim's opera The Navigator at the Judith Wright Centre of Contemporary Arts as part of the Brisbane Festival 2008, a work which Lim had developed during her stay in Berlin; Kosky had also directed her earlier opera The Oresteia (1993). The Navigator was also presented as part of the Melbourne International Arts Festival. In September 2008 Kosky directed Euripides' The Women of Troy with Melita Jurisic and Robyn Nevin in an adaptation by himself and Tom Wright at the Sydney Theatre Company. In August 2008 Melbourne University Publishing published an essay by Kosky, On Ecstasy (ISBN 978-0-522-85534-0). (Note: In this collection of four essays, Kosky was the only one not primarily a writer; the others were David Malouf, Germaine Greer and Blanche d'Alpuget.) In October 2008, Kosky presented his stage adaption of the Edgar Allan Poe short story "The Tell-Tale Heart" at the Melbourne International Arts Festival. In 2009 Kosky directed Janáček's From the House of the Dead at the Staatsoper Hannover, a production that won the Faust award. In the same year he started his Ring cycle in Hannover, which was finished in June 2011. In 2010, he directed Richard Strauss' Die schweigsame Frau at the Opera festival of the Bavarian State Opera in Munich. Later in the same year he presented a double bill production of Purcell's Dido and Aeneas and Bartók's Bluebeard's Castle at the Oper Frankfurt.

Following several productions in the past at the Komische Oper Berlin, including Ligeti's Le Grand Macabre (2003), Mozart's The Marriage of Figaro (2005), Gluck's Iphigénie en Tauride, Porter's Kiss Me, Kate (2008) (broadcast on German TV 3sat), Verdi's Rigoletto (2009), Dvořák Rusalka (2011) and collaborating with 1927's Die Zauberflöte (2012), Kosky became intendant and chief director for the company with the 2012/13 season. He has since presented some rarely staged operettas there, like Abraham's Ball im Savoy and Oscar Straus' Die Perlen der Cleopatra.

Kosky won the award for Best Director at the 2014 International Opera Awards.

In 2017, Kosky became the first Jewish director at the Bayreuth Festival with his production of Die Meistersinger von Nürnberg. He was also the first person who was not a member of the Wagner family to direct that opera there.

Kosky's production of Shostakovich's The Nose in a new English-language version by David Pountney for The Royal Opera, Opera Australia and the Komische Oper Berlin premiered in 2016 at the Royal Opera House in London, Kosky's debut at that house, and in 2018 at the Sydney Opera House and in Berlin. He returned to The Royal Opera in 2018 to present a controversial staging of Bizet's Carmen that was first staged at Oper Frankfurt in June 2017.

Commenting on the leading positions held by Jews in the Berlin cultural institutions, Kosky, who depicts himself as a "gay Jewish kangaroo", said:

...the more Jews the better in Berlin – bring it on! If you look at Berlin before the war, all the theatres were owned by Jews, it was like Broadway. They say that half the orchestras were full of Jewish musicians, all the major theatre directors were Jews.

In January 2019, the Komische Oper Berlin announced that Kosky is to stand down as intendant at the close of the 2021/22 season, and subsequently to continue his affiliation with the company as in-house director. Kosky had stated his own intention to return to a freelance career as a stage director with this announcement.

After staging Gluck's Armide at the Dutch National Opera in 2013, Kosky returned to direct a cycle of three Puccini operas: Tosca (early 2022), Turandot (late 2022), and Il trittico (2023). At the Vienna State Opera he was engaged for a Da Ponte cycle of Mozart operas, starting with Don Giovanni (in 2021) and Le nozze di Figaro (in 2023). Così fan tutte is due in June 2024.

== Awards ==
- 2022: Prize for Understanding and Tolerance, Jewish Museum Berlin
- 2024: Order of Merit of the Federal Republic of Germany (Verdienstkreuz am Bande)
