= Valeria Golino =

Italian model, actress and film director (born 1965)

- Golino in 2026
- Born: 22 October 1965 (age 60); Naples, Italy
- Occupations: Actress; filmmaker
- Years active: 1983–present
- Partner(s): Peter Del Monte (1985–1987); Benicio del Toro (1988–1992); Fabrizio Bentivoglio (1993–2001); Andrea Di Stefano (2002–2005); Riccardo Scamarcio (2006–2016)
- Awards: Volpi Cup for best actress – Venice Film Festival; 1985: Storia d'amore 2015: For your love

Valeria Golino (born 22 October 1965) is an Italian actress and filmmaker. She is best known to English-language audiences for her roles in Rain Man, Big Top Pee-wee (both 1988), and Hot Shots! (1991). She has won David di Donatello, Nastro d'Argento, Ciak d'oro, and Globo d'oro awards, and is one of four actresses to have twice won the Best Actress award at the Venice Film Festival.

== Early life ==
Golino was born on 22 October 1965 in Naples, Italy, the daughter of an Italian father who was a Germanist scholar, and a Greek mother, Lalla, who was a painter. One of her grandmothers was Egyptian French. She grew up in an "artistic household", and after her parents split up, was raised alternating between Athens and Sorrento (near Naples). Golino is the niece of the journalist Enzo Golino at L'Espresso, and her brother is a musician. When she was a girl, her mother frequently took her to the cinema, and she quickly became interested in films. In spite of this, though, she never thought about pursuing a film career until she made her first movie. Instead, she wanted to be a cardiologist.

Valeria was diagnosed with scoliosis at age 11, and she had a steel rod implanted in her back for five years. She remained in the care of a surgeon in Chicago for six months, where she learned to speak English. At age 14, she started to work as a fashion model in Athens, Milan, London, and Los Angeles. She was in TV commercials for beer, perfume, and cosmetics, and she modeled swimsuits and blue jeans.

== Career ==
=== 1983–1987 ===
Golino never formally studied acting. Her career started by chance when her uncle Enzo received a phone call from the director Lina Wertmüller, who was searching for a young girl for her movie, and encouraged Golino to go to Wertmüller's house to meet her.

The two met and Valeria was eventually cast in her first film, A Joke of Destiny (1983), alongside Ugo Tognazzi after an audition where she performed Shakespeare. Despite her parents' reservations and Wertmüller's demanding on-set behavior, she liked the experience so much that she decided to pursue an acting career. She gave up modeling, which she had never found fulfilling or interesting, and started to study diction and elocution. Among her early auditions were A Thorn in the Heart (an audition that she called "distasteful") and The Name of the Rose but was passed over for both films. She was offered roles in Giochi d'estate (1984) and other similarly themed romantic films about teenagers, but she turned them down to focus on smaller and more challenging projects.

She followed her first with a string of independent films, including roles in My Dearest Son and Little Flames (both 1985), her first leading role, both of which won her a Globo d'oro award for Best Breakthrough Actress. Later that year, she was involved in a car accident which displaced the metal rod in her back and had to have surgery in order to fix it: she was bedridden for five months.

Her star-making role came the following year, when she played the life-loving cleaning lady who romances two different men in A Tale of Love by Francesco Maselli. Her performance received rave reviews and earned her two prizes at the 1986 Venice Film Festival: the official Best Actress award (now called Volpi Cup) and the Golden Ciak award. The same film also won her the oldest and most prestigious critics' prize of the Italian cinema, the Silver Ribbon award for Best Actress.

Her following projects were once again independent, auteur-driven films, The Gold Rimmed Glasses and Love and Fear. She was supposed to reunite with Maselli for his following film L'uomo della casa di fronte, co-starring Marcello Mastroianni, but the project never happened. The same director then moved on to another film, Private Access, and Golino turned down the role that was eventually played by Ornella Muti.

=== 1988–2000 ===
She moved to Los Angeles in 1988, following her then-partner, a Puerto Rican actor. Her Hollywood period started with the movie Big Top Pee-wee (1988). She was cast in Rain Man (also 1988) as Susanna, the girlfriend of Tom Cruise's character, and in the comedy films Hot Shots! (1991) and Hot Shots! Part Deux (1993), as the girlfriend of the protagonist (Hot Shots! was a direct spoof of Top Gun). She became known for the "olive-in-the-belly-button" scene.

Her character's nationality in Rain Man was changed from American to Italian American to accommodate her accent. Even though she was known as a dramatic actress in Italy, most of the offers she received in Hollywood were for comedies.

Golino auditioned for lead roles in Pretty Woman and Flatliners, but both times she lost the part to Julia Roberts during the final audition. She was first runner-up for both roles and, in the case of Pretty Woman, she revealed many years later: "I was in the running until the final audition: it came down to Julia Roberts and me. The director asked us to walk in the same corridor, wearing the same clothes and makeup. As soon as I saw her [Roberts], I knew that she would have been chosen. And since she knew that, she told me: 'Go and get them, big mama!' I wouldn't have dared to say that to my rival. I would have been good in that film but she was perfect". She also turned down the leading role in the Ken Loach film Hidden Agenda, which she called "an offer that I still regret having declined".

In 1993, she was heavily involved in producing and starring in an independent feature film, Cat in the Box, which was never made, and because of that project, she was forced to turn down a role in a movie directed by Carlo Verdone.

During the following year, she was offered the leading role in True Lies, but she had to turn that down because of conflicts in scheduling with Slaughter of the Cock (1996), an independent film made in Cyprus. She had joined this film project in 1992, while it was still in preproduction, and she fervently wanted to be a part of it. Later on that year, she was supposed to act with Gian Maria Volonté in the film Treni sull'acqua. This project would have marked her third collaboration with the director Peter Del Monte, but it was canceled after the death of Volonté.

In early 1996, she was supposed to play a journalist in the film Bravo Randy, directed by Alessandro D'Alatri and also starring Jovanotti in the titular role of a tramp who falls into a coma after an accident. However, the project fell apart just a few months before shooting was slated to begin: fearing a lack of influence, the Italian production company blocked the funds as the film would have been shot in California.

=== 2000–present ===
In 2000, Golino returned to Italy. In January 2001, she was supposed to star with Claudio Amendola in a TV mini-series called Cuore di ghiaccio, directed by Luciano Casciani, produced by Mediaset and set in Cefalù, but the project never took off the ground.

She had a supporting role in the successful French thriller 36, Quai des Orfèvres (2004) and a leading role in Cash (2008), although the producers of the film had wanted Kristin Scott Thomas instead. Her role as Irene in Sacred Heart (2004) had been written specifically for her by director Ferzan Özpetek, but she was forced to abandon the project for personal reasons. She was replaced by Barbora Bobuľová.

In 2005, she was offered the leading role in Fine pena mai (2008) but she turned it down, considering herself to be too old for the part. The role was eventually played by Valentina Cervi.

In 2006, Theodoros Angelopoulos cast her in The Dust of Time (2008) after being impressed by Golino's work in Respiro. However the many delays in the shooting forced her to drop out of the project in late 2007 for scheduling conflicts. She was replaced by Irène Jacob.

In 2009, she was the subject of the monograph Valeria Golino: Respiro d'attrice by Massimo Causo.

The following year she was offered the chance to direct a short film by the company Pasta Garofalo, Armandino e il Madre, for which she also wrote the script. Her first feature film as director, Honey (2013), was screened in the Un Certain Regard section at the 2013 Cannes Film Festival and won a commendation from the Ecumenical Jury.

She played Armida Miserere, a high-security warden in Like the Wind (2013), directed by Marco Simon Puccioni, a difficult leading role praised by the critics and awarded in festival.

Despite her self-deprecating reluctance, she also sang in several films, most notably her English-language films Hot Shots! and Big Top Pee-wee and in Italian in Like the Wind. She recorded two LPs in 1987, the song "Maybe Once More" for L'inverno and 'Piangi Roma' for Giulia Doesn't Date at Night (featuring Baustelle), the latter of which won her a Silver Ribbon award for Best Song.

She is a member of AMPAS thanks to the invitation of Jack Lemmon and Walter Matthau.

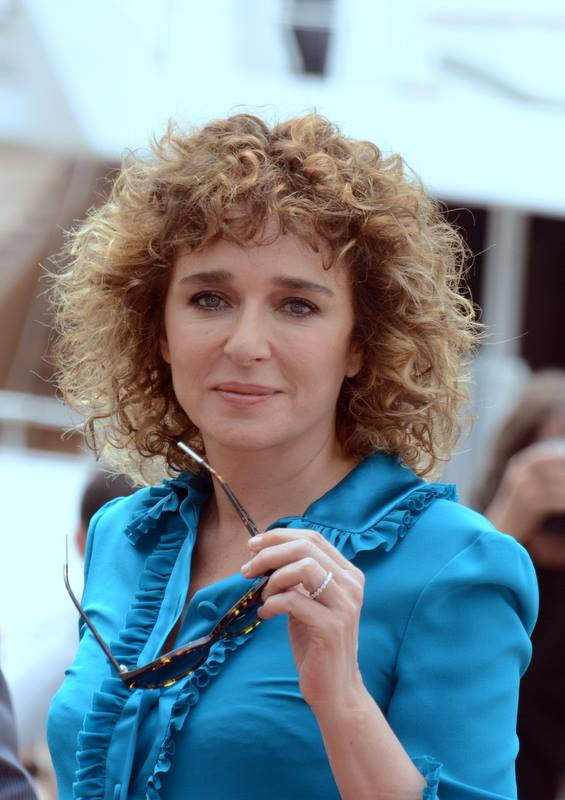
Golino at the 2016 Cannes Film Festival

In 2016, she was a member of the main competition jury of the 2016 Cannes Film Festival.

In 2018, she directed Euforia which was screened in the Un Certain Regard section at the 2018 Cannes Film Festival and is considered to be one of best performances of Riccardo Scamarcio, who played the main role.

Her recent project, L'Arte della Gioia TV series, was screened at the 77th Cannes Film Festival.

== Personal life ==
From 2005 to 2016, she dated Italian actor Riccardo Scamarcio. Since 2018, her partner is lawyer Fabio Palombi.

== Filmography ==
=== Films ===
Year	Title	Role(s)	Notes
1983	A Joke of Destiny	Adalgisa De Andreiis	
1984	Blind Date	Girl in bikini	Cameo appearance
1985	My Dearest Son	Francesca	
1985	Little Flames	Mara	
1986	Detective School Dropouts	Caterina Zanetti	
1986	A Tale of Love	Bruna	
1987	The Gold Rimmed Glasses	Nora Treves	
1987	Dernier Été à Tanger	Claudia Marchetti	
1988	Love and Fear	Sandra Parini	
1988	Big Top Pee-wee	Gina Piccolapupula	
1988	Rain Man	Susanna	
1989	Torrents of Spring	Gemma Rosselli	
1990	Traces of an Amorous Life	Lucia	
1990	The King's Whore	Jeanne de Luynes	
1991	Hot Shots!	Ramada Thompson	
1991	The Indian Runner	Maria	
1991	Year of the Gun	Lia	
1992	Puerto Escondido	Anita	
1993	Hot Shots! Part Deux	Ramada Thompson	
1994	Clean Slate	Sarah Novak / Beth Holly	
1994	Immortal Beloved	Julie Guicciardi	
1994	Like Two Crocodiles	Marta	
1995	Submission	Dolores	Short film
1995	Leaving Las Vegas	Terri	
1995	Four Rooms	Athena	
1996	An Occasional Hell	Elizabeth Laughton	
1996	Escape from L.A.	Taslima	
1996	Escoriandoli	Ida	
1996	Slaughter of the Cock	Wife	
1997	The Acrobats	Maria	
1998	Shooting the Moon	Silvia	
1998	Side Streets	Sylvie Ottie	
1999	Harem Suare	Anita	
2000	Things You Can Tell Just by Looking at Her	Lilly	
2000	Ivans Xtc	Constanza Vero	
2000	Against the Wind	Nina	
2001	Hotel	Italian actress	Cameo appearance
2002	Winter	Anna	
2002	Respiro	Grazia	
2002	Frida	Guadalupe Marín	
2003	Prendimi e portami via	Luciana	
2004	San-Antonio	L'italienne	
2004	36 Quai des Orfèvres	Camille Vrinks	
2005	Mario's War	Giulia	
2005	Texas	Maria	
2006	Our Country	Rita	
2007	Actrices	Nathalia Petrovna	
2007	The Girl by the Lake	Chiara Canali	
2007	Don't Waste Your Time, Johnny!	Annamaria	
2007	Black Sun	Agata	
2008	Quiet Chaos	Marta Siciliano	
2008	Cash	Julia Molina	
2008	La fabbrica dei tedeschi	Wife	
2009	Giulia Doesn't Date at Night	Giulia	
2009	The French Kissers	Actress on film	Cameo appearance
2009	The Cézanne Affair	Franca	
2010	Armandino e il madre	—N/a	Short film; Director
2010	Come un soffio	Hostess	Short film
2010	Dark Love	Psychologist	Cameo appearance
2010	School Is Over	Daria	
2011	Kryptonite!	Rosaria Sansone	
2013	Miele	—N/a	Director
2013	Like the Wind	Armida Miserere	
2013	Human Capital	Roberta Morelli	
2014	Jacky in Women's Kingdom	Bradi Vune	
2014	The Invisible Boy	Giovanna Silenzi	
2015	An Italian Name	Betta	
2015	Per amor vostro	Anna Ruotolo	
2015	The Very Private Life of Mister Sim	Luigia	
2016	La vita possibile	Carla	
2017	Il colore nascosto delle cose	Emma	
2018	The Invisible Boy: Second Generation	Giovanna Silenzi	
2018	Daughter of Mine	Tina	
2018	Euphoria	—N/a	Director
2018	The Summer House	Elena	
2019	Portrait of a Lady on Fire	The Countess	
2019	5 Is the Perfect Number	Rita	
2019	Adults in the Room	Danaī	
2019	Volare	Elena Manzato	
2019	Un confine incerto	Paola Cristiani	
2020	You Came Back	Perla Gallo	
2020	Fortuna	Gina / Rita	
2021	La terra dei figli	The Witch	
2021	The Catholic School	Ilaria Arbus	
2021	Occhi blu	Valeria	
2022	Marcel!	The psychoanalyst	
2023	I Told You So	Pupa	
2024	The Beautiful Game	Gabriella	
2024	Maria	Yakinthi Callas	
2025	Fuori	Goliarda Sapienza	
2025	La gioia	Gioia	
2025	Elisa	Laura	
2025	A Brief Affair	Cecilia	
2026	No Pain	Elsa	

=== Television ===
Year	Title	Role(s)	Notes
1995	Fallen Angels	Eugenie Kolchenko	Episode: "Red Wind"
1999	La vita che verrà	Nunzia	4 episodes
2002	Julius Caesar	Calpurnia	2 episodes
2008	Tigri di carta	Delacroix	3 episodes
2013	In Treatment	Eleonora	9 episodes
2021	The Morning Show	Paola Lambruschini	8 episodes
2023	The Lying Life of Adults	Vittoria	6 episodes
2025	The Art of Joy	—N/a	5 episodes Director; Writer

== Awards and nominations ==
Event	Year	Film	Award	Category	Result
Annecy Italian Film Festival, France	2012	Kryptonite!	Best Actress Award		Won
Athens Panorama of European Cinema, Greece	2009	Giulia Doesn't Date at Night	Special Award for Acting		Won
Barcelona Italian Film Festival, Spain	2013	–	Honorary CSCI Award		Won
Bari International Film Festival, Italy	2014	Come il vento	Italian Competition Award	Best Actress	Won
Brussels European Film Festival, Belgium	2013	Honey	Euromillions Audience Award		Won
Brussels European Film Festival, Belgium	2013	Honey	Studio L'Équipe Award		Won
Busto Arsizio Film Festival, Italy	2003	Respiro	Best Actress Award		Won
Cannes Film Festival, France	2013	Honey	Special Mention of the Ecumenical Jury		Won
Cannes Film Festival, France	2013	Honey	Golden Camera Award		Nominated
Cannes Film Festival, France	2013	Honey	Un Certain Regard Award		Nominated
Capri Hollywood, Italy	2013	Come il vento	Capri European Actress Award		Won
Castle of Precicchie Prize, Italy	2014	–	Castle of Precicchie Prize		Won
Cervia Spettacoli e Dintorni Festival, Italy	1986	–	Best Newcomer Award		Won
Cinema Italian Style, USA	2006	–	Innovator Award		Won
David di Donatello Awards, Italy	2026	Fuori	David di Donatello	Best Actress	Nominated
David di Donatello Awards, Italy	2026	A Brief Affair	David di Donatello	Best Supporting Actress	Nominated
David di Donatello Awards, Italy	2025	The Art of Joy	David di Donatello	Best Film	Nominated
David di Donatello Awards, Italy	2025	The Art of Joy	David di Donatello	Best Director	Nominated
David di Donatello Awards, Italy	2025	The Art of Joy	David di Donatello	Best Screenplay	Won
David di Donatello Awards, Italy	2020	Volare	David di Donatello	Best Actress	Nominated
David di Donatello Awards, Italy	2020	5 Is the Perfect Number	David di Donatello	Best Supporting Actress	Won
David di Donatello Awards, Italy	2019	Euphoria	David di Donatello	David Youth Award	Nominated
David di Donatello Awards, Italy	2019	Euphoria	David di Donatello	Best Original Screenplay	Nominated
David di Donatello Awards, Italy	2019	Euphoria	David di Donatello	Best Director	Nominated
David di Donatello Awards, Italy	2019	Euphoria	David di Donatello	Best Film	Nominated
David di Donatello Awards, Italy	2018	Il colore nascosto delle cose	David di Donatello	Best Actress	Nominated
David di Donatello Awards, Italy	2017	La vita possibile	David di Donatello	Best Supporting Actress	Nominated
David di Donatello Awards, Italy	2016	Per amor vostro	David di Donatello	Best Actress	Nominated
David di Donatello Awards, Italy	2015	The Invisible Boy	David di Donatello	Best Supporting Actress	Nominated
David di Donatello Awards, Italy	2014	Human Capital	David di Donatello	Best Supporting Actress	Won
David di Donatello Awards, Italy	2014	Honey	David di Donatello	Best New Director	Nominated
David di Donatello Awards, Italy	2014	Honey	David di Donatello	Best Screenplay	Nominated
David di Donatello Awards, Italy	2012	Kryptonite!	David di Donatello	Best Actress	Nominated
David di Donatello Awards, Italy	2009	Giulia Doesn't Date at Night	David di Donatello	Best Actress	Nominated
David di Donatello Awards, Italy	2008	Quiet Chaos	David di Donatello	Best Supporting Actress	Nominated
David di Donatello Awards, Italy	2006	Mario's War	David di Donatello	Best Actress	Won
David di Donatello Awards, Italy	2003	Respiro	David di Donatello	Best Actress	Nominated
David di Donatello Awards, Italy	1998	The Acrobats	David di Donatello	Best Actress	Nominated
David di Donatello Awards, Italy	1988	The Gold Rimmed Glasses	David di Donatello	Best Actress	Nominated
David di Donatello Awards, Italy	1987	A Tale of Love	David di Donatello	Best Actress	Nominated
Eolie Film Festival, Italy	1987	–	Plate of the City of Lipari		Won
European Film Awards	2013	Honey	European Film Award	Discovery of the Year	Nominated
European Film Awards	2003	Respiro	Audience Award	Best Actress	Nominated
Federazione Italiana Cinema d'Essai, Italy	2011	Kryptonite!	FICE Award	Best Actress	Won
Federazione Italiana Cinema d'Essai, Italy	2006	Our Country	FICE Award	Best Actress	Won
Federazione Italiana Cinema d'Essai, Italy	2005	Mario's War	FICE Award	Best Actress	Won
Festival delle Cerase, Italy	2007	Mario's War	Winter Award		Won
Flaiano International Awards, Italy	2013	Honey	Golden Pegasus	Best Director	Won
Flaiano International Awards, Italy	2006	Mario's War	Golden Pegasus	Best Actress	Won
Gallio Film Festival, Italy	2013	Honey	Best Screenplay Award		Won
Gavoi Film Festival, Italy	2005	–	Honorary Silver Tumbarinu		Won
Giffoni Film Festival, Italy	2011	–	Giffoni Award		Won
Giffoni Film Festival, Italy	2002	Respiro	Bronze Gryphon	Best Actress	Won
Golden Ciak Awards, Italy	2015	The Invisible Boy	Golden Ciak	Best Supporting Actress	Nominated
Golden Ciak Awards, Italy	2014	Honey	Golden Ciak	Best First Feature	Won
Golden Ciak Awards, Italy	2014	Honey	Golden Ciak	Best Screenplay	Nominated
Golden Ciak Awards, Italy	2012	Kryptonite!	Golden Ciak	Best Actress	Won
Golden Ciak Awards, Italy	2011	L'amore buio	Golden Ciak	Best Supporting Actress	Nominated
Golden Ciak Awards, Italy	2008	Quiet Chaos	Golden Ciak	Best Supporting Actress	Nominated
Golden Ciak Awards, Italy	1987	A Tale of Love	Golden Ciak	Best Actress	Won
Golden Globe Awards, Italy	2013	Honey	Golden Globe	Best Debut Feature Film	Won
Golden Globe Awards, Italy	2012	Kryptonite!	Golden Globe	Best Actress	Nominated
Golden Globe Awards, Italy	2006	Mario's War	Golden Globe	Best Actress	Won
Golden Globe Awards, Italy	2004	Take Me Away	Golden Globe	Best Actress	Nominated
Golden Globe Awards, Italy	2002	L'inverno	Golden Globe	Best Actress	Nominated
Golden Globe Awards, Italy	1986	Little Flames	Golden Globe	Best Breakthrough Actress	Won
Golden Globe Awards, Italy	1986	My Dearest Son	Golden Globe	Best Breakthrough Actress	Won
Golden Goblet Awards, Italy	1997	Le acrobate	Golden Goblet	Best Actress	Won
Golden Graal Awards, Italy	2009	Quiet Chaos	Golden Graal	Best Dramatic Actress	Nominated
Golden Graal Awards, Italy	2008	The Girl by the Lake	Golden Graal	Best Dramatic Actress	Won
Golden Graal Awards, Italy	2007	Mario's War	Golden Graal	Best Dramatic Actress	Nominated
Golden Graal Awards, Italy	2006	Texas	Golden Graal	Best Dramatic Actress	Nominated
Golden Graal Awards, Italy	2005	36 Quai des Orfèvres	Golden Graal	Best International Performer	Won
Golden Sacher Awards, Italy	1997	Le acrobate	Golden Sacher	Best Actress	Won
Haifa International Film Festival, Israel	2013	Honey	Special Mention of the Jury		Won
Ischia Global Film & Music Festival, Italy	2013	Honey	Breakout Italian Director of the Year Award		Won
Kinéo Awards, Italy	2013	Honey	Kinéo Award		Won
Kinéo Awards, Italy	2012	Kryptonite!	Kinéo Award	Best Actress	Nominated
Kinéo Awards, Italy	2009	Giulia Doesn't Date at Night	Kinéo Award	Best Actress	Nominated
Kinéo Awards, Italy	2008	The Girl by the Lake	Kinéo Award	Best Supporting Actress	Nominated
Kinéo Awards, Italy	2008	Quiet Chaos	Kinéo Award	Best Supporting Actress	Nominated
Kinéo Awards, Italy	2003	Respiro	Kinéo Award	Best Actress	Won
Lecce European Film Festival, Italy	2007	–	Honorary Award		Won
Ljubljana International Film Festival, Slovenia	2013	Honey	Kingfisher Award		Won
Los Angeles Italia, USA	2014	–	Excellence Award		Won
Lux Prize	2013	Honey	Lux Prize		2nd place
Magna Graecia Film Festival, Italy	2013	Honey	Best First Feature Award		Won
Mantova Film Festival, Italy	2013	Honey	Golden Laurel		Won
Maremetraggio International Festival, Italy	2012	Kryptonite!	Ippocampo Competition Award	Best Actress	Won
Marzamemi Border Film Festival, Italy	2007	–	WindJet Award		Won
Mons International Love Film Festival, Belgium	2003	Respiro	Best Actress Award		Won
New Italian Cinema Events Festival, Italy	2012	Kryptonite!	Susan Batson Award	Best Acting Performance	Won
Nice Italian Film Festival, France	1985	My Dearest Son	Best Newcomer Award		Won
Primavera del Cinema Italiano Festival, Italy	2009	Giulia Doesn't Date at Night	Federico II Award	Best Actress	Won
Rome Film Festival, Italy	2013	Come il vento	L.A.R.A. Award		Won
Sergio Amidei Prize	2013	Honey	Sergio Amidei Prize		Won
Silver Ribbon Awards (Nastro d'Argento), Italy	2025	Fuori	Silver Ribbon	Best Actress	Won
Silver Ribbon Awards (Nastro d'Argento), Italy	2021	Fortuna	Silver Ribbon	Best Actress	Nominated
Silver Ribbon Awards (Nastro d'Argento), Italy	2020	Portrait of a Lady on Fire and 5 Is the Perfect Number	Silver Ribbon	Best Supporting Actress	Won
Silver Ribbon Awards (Nastro d'Argento), Italy	2019	The Summer House	Silver Ribbon	Best Supporting Actress	Nominated
Silver Ribbon Awards (Nastro d'Argento), Italy	2019	Euphoria	Silver Ribbon	Best Screenplay	Nominated
Silver Ribbon Awards (Nastro d'Argento), Italy	2019	Euphoria	Silver Ribbon	Best Director	Nominated
Silver Ribbon Awards (Nastro d'Argento), Italy	2019	Euphoria	Silver Ribbon	Best Film	Nominated
Silver Ribbon Awards (Nastro d'Argento), Italy	2018	Daughter of Mine	Silver Ribbon	Best Actress	Nominated
Silver Ribbon Awards (Nastro d'Argento), Italy	2016	Per amor vostro	Silver Ribbon	Best Actress	Nominated
Silver Ribbon Awards (Nastro d'Argento), Italy	2014	Come il vento	Silver Ribbon	Best Actress	Nominated
Silver Ribbon Awards (Nastro d'Argento), Italy	2013	Honey	Silver Ribbon	Best Debut Feature Film	Won
Silver Ribbon Awards (Nastro d'Argento), Italy	2012	Kryptonite!	Silver Ribbon	Best Actress	Nominated
Silver Ribbon Awards (Nastro d'Argento), Italy	2011	Armandino e il Madre	Silver Ribbon	Best Debut Short Film	Won
Silver Ribbon Awards (Nastro d'Argento), Italy	2011	Armandino e il Madre	Silver Ribbon	Best Short Film	Nominated
Silver Ribbon Awards (Nastro d'Argento), Italy	2010	The Cézanne Affair	Silver Ribbon	Best Actress	Nominated
Silver Ribbon Awards (Nastro d'Argento), Italy	2009	Giulia Doesn't Date at Night	Silver Ribbon	Best Original Song	Won
Silver Ribbon Awards (Nastro d'Argento), Italy	2009	Giulia Doesn't Date at Night	Silver Ribbon	Best Actress	Nominated
Silver Ribbon Awards (Nastro d'Argento), Italy	2007	Mario's War	Silver Ribbon	Best Actress	Nominated
Silver Ribbon Awards (Nastro d'Argento), Italy	2006	Texas	Silver Ribbon	Best Actress	Nominated
Silver Ribbon Awards (Nastro d'Argento), Italy	2004	Take Me Away	Silver Ribbon	Best Actress	Nominated
Silver Ribbon Awards (Nastro d'Argento), Italy	2002	Respiro	Silver Ribbon	Best Actress	Won
Silver Ribbon Awards (Nastro d'Argento), Italy	1999	Shooting the Moon	Silver Ribbon	Best Actress	Nominated
Silver Ribbon Awards (Nastro d'Argento), Italy	1989	Rain Man	Silver Ribbon	Best Supporting Actress	Nominated
Silver Ribbon Awards (Nastro d'Argento), Italy	1988	Three Sisters	Silver Ribbon	Best Actress	Nominated
Silver Ribbon Awards (Nastro d'Argento), Italy	1987	A Tale of Love	Silver Ribbon	Best Actress	Won
Silver Ribbon Awards (Nastro d'Argento), Italy	1986	Little Flames	Silver Ribbon	Best Actress	Nominated
Sulmona Film Festival, Italy	2002	Respiro	Best Actress Award		Won
Taormina Film Festival, Italy	2006	Mario's War	Best Actress Award		Won
Taormina Film Festival, Italy	2006	–	Taormina Arte Award for Cinematic Excellence		Won
Terra di Siena Film Festival, Italy	2009	–	Honorary Award		Won
Tétouan International Mediterranean Festival, Morocco	2014	Honey	Best First Work Award		Won
Thessaloniki International Film Festival, Greece	2006	–	Honorary Golden Alexander		Won
Thessaloniki International Film Festival, Greece	1996	I sfagi tou kokora	Greek Competition Award	Best Actress	Won
Trani Film Festival, Italy	2002	–	Stupor Mundi Award		Won
Valenciennes Festival 2 Cinéma, France	2014	Come il vento	Best Actress Award		Won
Vasto Film Festival, Italy	2012	–	Honorary Award		Won
Venice Film Festival, Italy	2015	For Your Love	Volpi Cup	Best Actress	Won
Venice Film Festival, Italy	2015	For Your Love	Pasinetti Award	Best Actress	Won
Venice Film Festival, Italy	1986	A Tale of Love	Best Actress Award		Won
Venice Film Festival, Italy	1986	A Tale of Love	Golden Ciak	Best Actress	Won
Viareggio EuropaCinema Festival, Italy	2003	Take Me Away	EuropaCinema Award	Best Actress	Won
Vittorio De Sica Awards, Italy	2013	Honey	Vittorio De Sica Award		Won
Vittorio De Sica Awards, Italy	1986	–	Vittorio De Sica Award		Won

== See also ==
- List of female film and television directors
