= The Gold Rimmed Glasses =

- Theatrical release poster
- Directed by: Giuliano Montaldo
- Screenplay by: Enrico Medioli; Valerio Zurlini
- Based on: The Gold Rimmed Glasses by Giorgio Bassani
- Produced by: Leo Pescarolo
- Starring: Philippe Noiret; Rupert Everett; Valeria Golino; Stefania Sandrelli
- Cinematography: Armando Nannuzzi
- Edited by: Alfredo Muschietti
- Music by: Ennio Morricone
- Distributed by: Reteitalia
- Release date: 24 September 1987 (Italy)
- Running time: 110 minutes
- Countries: Italy; France; Yugoslavia
- Language: Italian

Gli occhiali d'oro (internationally released as The Gold Rimmed Glasses) is a 1987 Italian drama film directed by Giuliano Montaldo, starring Philippe Noiret, Rupert Everett and Valeria Golino. Set in Ferrara and in a nearby seaside resort in 1938, the plot follows a Jewish student and a homosexual doctor who suffer persecution in Fascist Italy. The film is an adaptation of Giorgio Bassani's novel The Gold Rimmed Spectacles (Gli occhiali d'oro).

It entered the main competition at the 1987 Venice Film Festival, where it won two Golden Osellas for Best Costume Design and Best Set Design. For his soundtrack Ennio Morricone won the David di Donatello for Best Score.

== Plot ==
The corpse of a man, drowned in the river Po, is brought to shore by fishermen. The man's broken gold rimmed glasses lie stuck in the mud next to him. His story is told in flashback.

Ferrara, 1938 – Doctor Athos Fadigati is a middle age otolaryngologist with a prosperous pediatric practice. Cultured and well off, he belongs to the city's bourgeois society. While walking around town, Dr Fadigati meets Nora, the only daughter of one of his friends. The warmhearted doctor purchases a painting and gives it to Nora as a gift for her ailing father. Nora is the last member of the Treves, a Jewish family whose fortune has fluctuated through the years. Nora is in love with Davide Lattes, a young literature student at the university of Bologna, who dreams of becoming a writer. Davide is also Jewish and lives comfortably with his parents and young sister. Their way of life is threatened as the fascist regime of Mussolini begins to apply antisemitic measures. Davide is worried particularly after one of his university professor is laid off for being Jewish and none came to his defense. Davide's concerns are not shared by his father, who plays down the news of the persecution of Jews in Germany. The father thinks that something similar could not take place in Italy, where the Jewish community has lived undisturbed for centuries. Nora's father dies and her attitude changes as she takes over her father's business deals. She and Davide are very much in love. One night after making love, Nora is able to tell Davide that she loves him for the first time.

Davide, as many young students in Ferrara, commutes daily by train to the university in Bologna. Twice a week, the solitary bespectacled Fadigati takes the same train. Eventually the doctor befriends the students, some of which were his patients when they were children. There are rumors around town that the bachelor doctor is homosexual. One of the students, Eraldo, is certain that the doctor is gay and he is sometimes insolent towards Fadigati. Eraldo, an amateur boxer, invites Dr. Fadigati to see him fight. Although he dislikes boxing, the doctor accepts the invitation. At the end of the boxing match, when he goes to greet the young man, Fadigati finds Eraldo taking a shower. Eraldo is ambitious and befriends Fadigati, sharing his confidences with him. Eraldo comes from a humbler background than most of his friends. He was abandoned by his father, who emigrated to America, but has been spoiled by his mother, a housemaid who has worked hard to give him what he wants. Eraldo has never gone on vacation away from Ferrara and Dr Fadigati, smitten with him, invites him to go together to a nearby resort town.

At the sea-side resort town in the Adriatic coast, the pairing of Fadigati and Eraldo arouses the malicious gossip of Signora Lavezzoli, an obnoxious but influential member of Ferrara's society. Eraldo quickly leaves the doctor alone to pursue girls. Davide, seeing Eraldo's exploitation of Fadigati and the vengeful attitude of Signora Lavezzoli, takes pity on the doctor. Carlotta, a flirty but well-intentioned friend, accompanies Davide while Nora arrives. At a gala, taking place at the local hotel, Nora is invited to dance by a fascist leader, leaving Davide alone and offended. The same night, Fadigati confronts Eraldo, who makes a scene punching the doctor in the face, leaving him bleeding and humiliated. Back in his hotel room accompanied by Davide, Fadigati discovers that Eraldo has stolen all he could. The scandal at the hotel completely destroys Fadigati's reputation.

Back in Ferrara, the fascist regime's grip over the Jewish community tightens. Davide like all Jewish students is expelled from the university. Nora breaks definitely with him; she chooses survival over love. To escape the persecution of the Jews, she decides to convert to Catholicism and to marry her fascist suitor. Davide is left heartbroken. Marked by the scandal, the life of Dr Fadigati has completely collapsed. He is outcast by his former friends and the society of Ferrara turn its back on him. Fired from the clinic where he used to work, Fadigati is morally and economically in ruins. The doctor befriends a street dog, but he is eventually abandoned even by his pet. Only Davide comes to visit the fallen doctor. They make plans for an excursion to the river Po, but it has to be cancelled due to the rain. In spite of the rain Fadigati takes a bus to the shore of the river Po and begins to walk towards his death. A title informs viewers that Nora married her fascist lover and died two years later during childbirth. Eraldo emigrated to France where he started a career as a boxer, but without success. Davide became a well-known writer. Many members of the Jewish community of Ferrara were killed in concentration camps.

== Cast ==
- Philippe Noiret as Doctor Athos Fadigati
- Rupert Everett as Davide Lattes
- Valeria Golino as Nora Treves
- Nicola Farron as Eraldo
- Stefania Sandrelli as Signora Lavezzoli
- Rade Markovic as Bruno Lattes (Davide's father)
- Roberto Herlitzka as Professor Amos Perugia
- Luca Zingaretti as Molon
- Ivana Despotovic as Carlotta
