= Schauspielhaus Wien =

Theatre in Vienna, Austria

Coordinates: 48°13′12″N 16°21′41″E

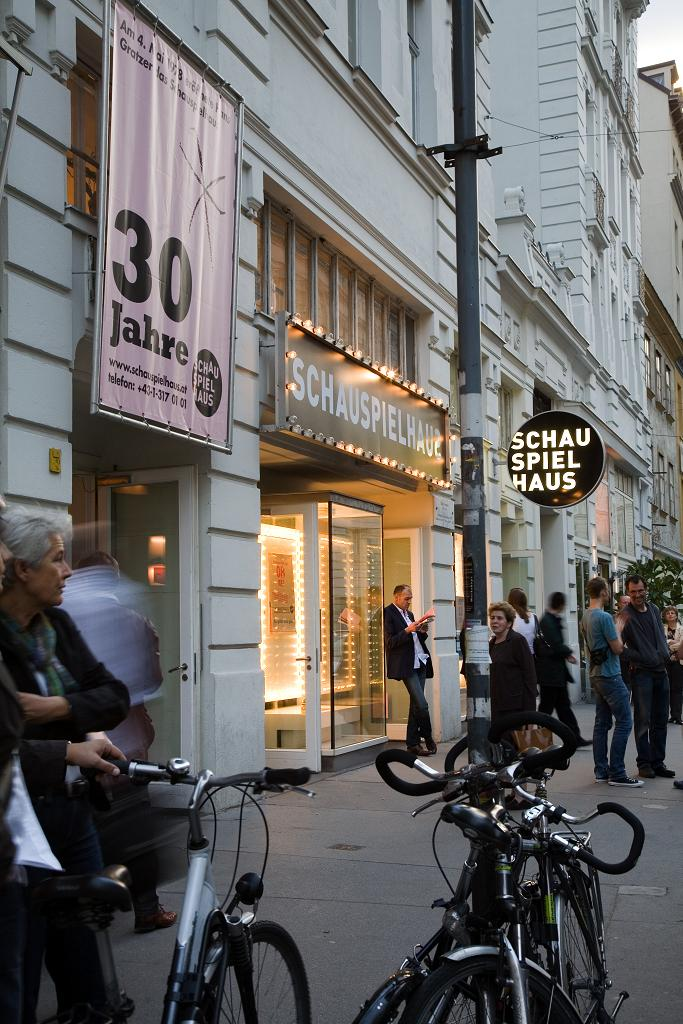
Frontage of the theatre

Schauspielhaus Wien is a theatre in Vienna, Austria, located at 19 Porzellangasse in the 9th District of Vienna (Alsergrund).

As of the 2023/24 season, the artistic direction is collectively shared by director Marie Bues, dramaturge Martina Grohmann, director and dramaturge Tobias Herzberg, and author and dramaturge Mazlum Nergiz. Under their leadership, Schauspielhaus Wien has launched a new audience platform “Offenes^Haus” (Open House) which offers participatory projects for the neighbourhood and the general public.

== History ==
The history of the theatre extends back to the beginning of the 20th century, when there was a variety club located in the basement of 19 Porzellangasse. This was later adapted into one of Vienna's first cinemas and operated from 1913 to 1975 under the names Heimat-Kino ("Home Cinema") and Citta 2000 (including a period during the Third Reich where it was cleared of non-Aryan control). In the last year of its existence, it held seating for 597 people.

1979–1986

The actual theatre opened on 4 May 1978 with Jean Genet's play Der Balkon ("The Balcony") following its renovation by Hans Gratzer (1941 in Vienna Neustadt – 2005 in Rainfeld), leader of the theatre group Werkstatt ("Workshop") which operated out of the Neues Theater am Kärtnertor theatre. Hans Gratzer performed classic productions, contemporary drama and musical productions at the Schauspielhaus until 1986.

1987–1990

From 1987 until 1990, George Tabori (*1914 in Budapest; † 2007 in Berlin) installed his theatre group Der Kreis ("the Circle") in the theatre.

1991–2001

Hans Gratzer returned to the Schauspielhaus between 1991 and 2001 for a second spell as director. He tried to position the theatre as a first-class contemporary German-language theatre by hosting premiers and first performances. One of his greatest successes was in discovering the playwright Werner Schwab. In his final season, Gratzer, working alongside Martin Haselböck, produced only musical theatre from the theatre, while a completely new form of theatre, Der Schaufenster ("shop window"), was staged in the alleyway pub next door.

2001–2007

Airan Berg (*1961 in Tel Aviv) und Barrie Kosky (*1967 in Melbourne) were installed as artistic directors of the theatre in 2001. Their intercultural approach opened the theatre up to diverse interpretations of the most varied cultures. The campaign Hunger auf Kunst und Kultur ("Hunger for Art and Culture") was initiated in 2003 with cooperation from the National Anti-Poverty Conference, with the aim of making the arts accessible to people from socially disadvantaged backgrounds. Kosky departed in 2005 following creative differences with his co-director; Airan Berg led it until 2007 as an international coproduction stage. Theater für Alle ("Theatre for Everyone") started in 2005 through cooperation between the Schauspielhaus and the University of Vienna (Faculty of Education); this was a project aiming to open up theatre to the blind and partially-sighted through the use of trained cultural assistants.

2007–2015

Andreas Beck (*1965 in Mülheim an der Ruhr) became artistic director of the Schauspielhaus from 2007 until 2015. Under his direction, the Schauspielhaus saw itself as a theatre of the contemporary, as an author's theatre in the "classical" sense. The focus was on young and recent drama. Andreas Beck was commended for the new start in the Schauspielhaus Vienna with the Nestroy Special Prize 2008.

More Nestroy Theatre Awards followed; Kathrin Röggla won the Authors Prize 2010 (best play) for her writing on "worst case", produced by Lukas Bangerter. In 2011 Franziska Hackl was the winner of the Rising Star category for Flora in Grillenpark by Thomas Arzt. In the Best Actor category the same year, Max Mayer was commended for his role as the hunter/fisher in the same play, as well as different rolls in Bruno Schulz: Der Messias by Malgorzata Sikorska Miszuk. In 2014, the Authors Prize (Best Play) went to David Grieg for Die Ereignisse in its first German production by Ramin Gray. The Nestroy for the Best Set Design 2015 was awarded to Ivan Bazak for Johnny Breitwieser, while the lead actor Martin Vischer was nominated for Best Actor.

Since 2015

Tomas Schweigen (*1977 in Vienna) has been artistic director of since July 2015. Jan-Christoph Gockel was nominated for the Nestroy Theatre Award in the category Best Director in 2016, for his work on Imperium, adapted from Christian Kracht's novel of the same name. The 2016/17 season was the first time in the history of the theatre that two productions – Cellar Door and Imperium – had been nominate for the Berliner Theatertreffen ("Berlin Theatre Festival"). In the same year, the production Città del Vaticano from Falk Richter/Nir de Volff was invited to the Lessingtagen theatre festival at Hamburg's Thalia Theatre, while Diese Mauer fasst sich selbst zusammen und der Stern hat gesprochen, der Stern hat auch was gesagt by Miroslava Svolikova (Director: Franz-Xaver Mayr) was invited to the Authors Theatre Festival at the Deutsches Theater in Berlin.

== Ensemble ==
The current ensemble of actors includes Tala Al-Deen, Iris Becher, Tina Keserović, Florentine Krafft, Kaspar Locher, Sissi Reich, Ursula Reiter, Maximilian Thienen and Sophia Löffler, who was already part of the previous directorial period at Schauspielhaus Wien.
