= Dragon Chow =

1987 drama film

- Directed by: Jan Schütte
- Screenplay by: Jan Schütte; Thomas Strittmatter
- Starring: Bhasker; Ric Young
- Cinematography: Lutz Konermann
- Edited by: Renate Merck; Andreas Schreitmüller
- Music by: Claus Bantzer
- Release date: 1987
- Language: German

Dragon Chow (German: Drachenfutter) is a 1987 drama film co-written and directed by Jan Schütte, in his feature directorial debut. A co-production between West Germany and Switzerland, it premiered at the 44th Venice International Film Festival.

== Cast ==
- Bhasker as Shezad
- Ric Young as Xiao
- Buddy Uzzaman as Rashid
- Wolf-Dietrich Sprenger as Herder
- Ulrich Wildgruber as Udo
- Frank Oladeinde as Dale

== Production ==
The film was shot in black and white in Hamburg. It was produced by Novoskop Film, Probst Film and Bern Production.

== Release ==
The film had its premiere at the 44th edition of the Venice Film Festival, in the Venice International Film Critics' Week, in which it won the Premio Cinecritica.

== Reception ==
A contemporary Variety review described the film as 'a modest enterprise of surprising impact', and noted: ' Schutte’s film doesn't preach and doesn’t point accusing fingers inany specific direction, except to the vultures who make money out of the misfortune of others. In spite of the grim subject and unflattering scenery in which evolves, both direction and performances [...] preserve a human, at times humorous dimension that works to the picture’s advantage'. La Stampa's film critic Lietta Tornabuoni also praised the film, referring to it as 'never overly-sentimental, poignant and moving, showing stylistic maturity'. German film critic Harry Rowohlt wrote: 'The film ends on a sad note, of course, but it leaves you feeling happy: finally, a successful German film, [which is] neither too long nor too loud, subtle, yet well-made'.
