= Long Live the Lady! =

- Directed by: Ermanno Olmi
- Written by: Ermanno Olmi
- Cinematography: Ermanno Olmi; Maurizio Zaccaro
- Edited by: Giulia Ciniselli; Ermanno Olmi
- Music by: Georg Philipp Telemann
- Release date: 1987
- Language: Italian

Long Live the Lady! (Italian: Lunga vita alla signora!) is a 1987 Italian coming-of-age drama film written and directed by Ermanno Olmi.

The film was entered into the main competition at the 44th edition of the Venice Film Festival, where it got the Silver Lion and the FIPRESCI Prize.

== Cast ==
- Marco Esposito as Libenzio
- Simona Brandalise as Corinna
- Stefania Busarello as Anna
- Simone Dalla Rosa as Mao
- Lorenzo Paolini as Ciccio
- Tarcisio Tosi as PG (Pigi)
- Marisa Abbate as La 'Signorina'
