= Roger Scholes =

Australian filmmaker (1950–2022)

Roger Scholes (11 December 1950 – 3 June 2022) was an Australian independent filmmaker. He worked as a producer, director, writer, script editor, cinematographer, and editor in drama and documentary projects for cinema and television.

== Early career ==
Scholes graduated from the Swinburne Film and TV School, now the University of Melbourne Faculty of VCA and MCM, in 1971 and worked at Fred Schepisi’s Film House in Melbourne. During the 1970s, he worked in France, Switzerland, U.K. and United States. In 1982, he returned to Swinburne for the post-graduate course and was awarded Best Director at his graduation. In December 1982, Scholes directed and edited a short film, The Franklin River Blockade, about the Franklin Dam.

== Career ==
During the 1980s, Scholes directed his first and only feature film, The Tale of Ruby Rose. The film won four critics prizes at the Venice Film Festival in 1987, including Best Actress and Best Director. In 1988, Scholes and his partner, Katherine Scholes, formed their production company, Edward Street Films. Together, they produced numerous documentaries, including The Valley, The Last Tall Forests and Home of the Brave, the latter of which won First Prize at the International ITVA American Film Awards in 1993.

In 1996, Scholes co-wrote and directed The Coolbaroo Club, a dramatised documentary for cinema and television release. It won the 1996 Human Rights Award for Media. In 1998, he co-wrote and directed The Human Journey, a three-hour documentary series for ABC TV and Discovery Channel, which won the 2000 Eureka Prize for Science Media. He also wrote and directed the teleseries Stories from the Stone Age for ABC TV, S4c and Channel 4. He directed the documentary series Last Port of Call and Future Shack for ABC in 2006 and The Passionate Apprentices for SBS in 2010.

In 2014, Scholes was cinematographer on the ABC documentary Defendant 5 and production designer on the series Death or Liberty. He worked as a cinematographer for over 35 years, with experience in both celluloid and digital formats.

== Personal life and death ==
Scholes was married to Katherine Scholes and raised two sons. The couple first met in 1975, when Roger was 25 years old and Katherine was 16 years old, but their relationship began five years later while scouting locations in the Tasmanian wilderness for the future feature film The Tale of Ruby Rose. He died on 3 June 2022 after a long illness.
