= Invitation au voyage =

1982 film

- French theatrical release poster
- Directed by: Peter Del Monte
- Written by: Peter Del Monte; Jean Bany; Franco Ferrini
- Produced by: Mario Gallo
- Starring: Laurent Malet
- Cinematography: Bruno Nuytten
- Edited by: Agnès Guillemot
- Music by: Gabriel Yared
- Release date: 19 May 1982
- Running time: 93 minutes
- Countries: France; Italy; West Germany
- Language: French

Invitation au voyage is a 1982 French drama film directed by Peter Del Monte. It was entered into the 1982 Cannes Film Festival, where it won the prize for the Best Artistic Contribution.

== Cast ==
- Laurent Malet - Lucien
- Aurore Clément - The young woman
- Mario Adorf - Timour
- Corinne Reynaud - Nina Scott (as Nina Scott)
- Franca Maresa
- Raymond Bussières - Le vieil homme
- Robin Renucci - Gérard
- Serge Spira - Un représentant
- Boris Azais
- Gérald Denizeau - (as Gérard Denizot)
- Guy Dhers
- Ben D'Jackis
- Malek Kateb - (as Malek Eddine Kateb)
- Marcel Gassouk - L'homme au chariot
- Manuela Gourary - La patronne caféteria
