= Jan Schütte =

German film director

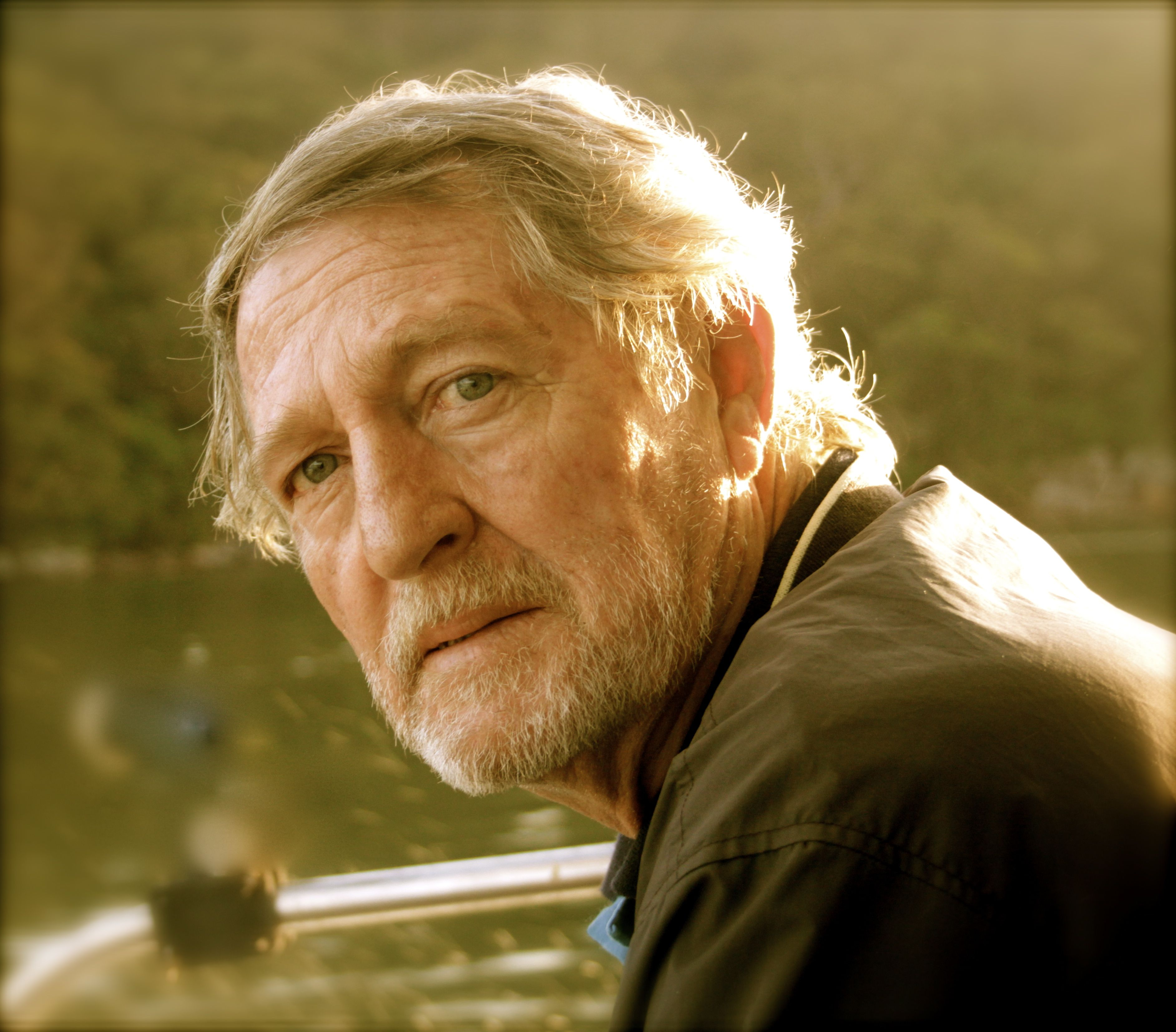
- Born: 26 June 1957 (age 68); Mannheim, West Germany
- Occupations: Film director Screenwriter
- Years active: 1982–present

Jan Schütte (born 26 June 1957) is a German film director and screenwriter. He has directed twelve films since 1982. After graduating from high school, he studied literature, philosophy and art history in Tübingen, Zurich and Hamburg. From 1979 he worked as a television reporter for regional TV programs. His first feature film Dragon Chow premiered at the Venice Film Festival in 1987. His film The Farewell was screened in the Un Certain Regard section at the 2000 Cannes Film Festival. Schütte was director of the German Film and Television Academy and is the director of the American Film Institute in Los Angeles.

Schütte lives with his wife Christina Szápáry in Los Angeles and Berlin.

== Filmography ==
- Ugge Bärtle – Bildhauer (1982, documentary)
- Dragon Chow (1987) — (screenplay with Thomas Strittmatter)
- Lost in America (1989, documentary)
- Winckelmann's Travels (1990) — (screenplay with Thomas Strittmatter)
- Nach Patagonien (1991, documentary) — (based on In Patagonia by Bruce Chatwin)
- Bye Bye America (1994) — (screenplay with Thomas Strittmatter)
- Eine Reise in das Innere von Wien (1995, documentary) — (based on a novel by Gerhard Roth)
- Fat World (1998) — (based on a novel by Helmut Krausser)
- The Farewell (2000) — (film about Bertolt Brecht's last summer)
- Old Love (2001, short) — (based on a short story by Isaac Bashevis Singer)
- SuperTex (2003) — (based on a novel by Leon de Winter)
- Love Comes Lately (2007) — (based on short stories by Isaac Bashevis Singer)
