= Peter Del Monte =

Italian film director (1943–2021)

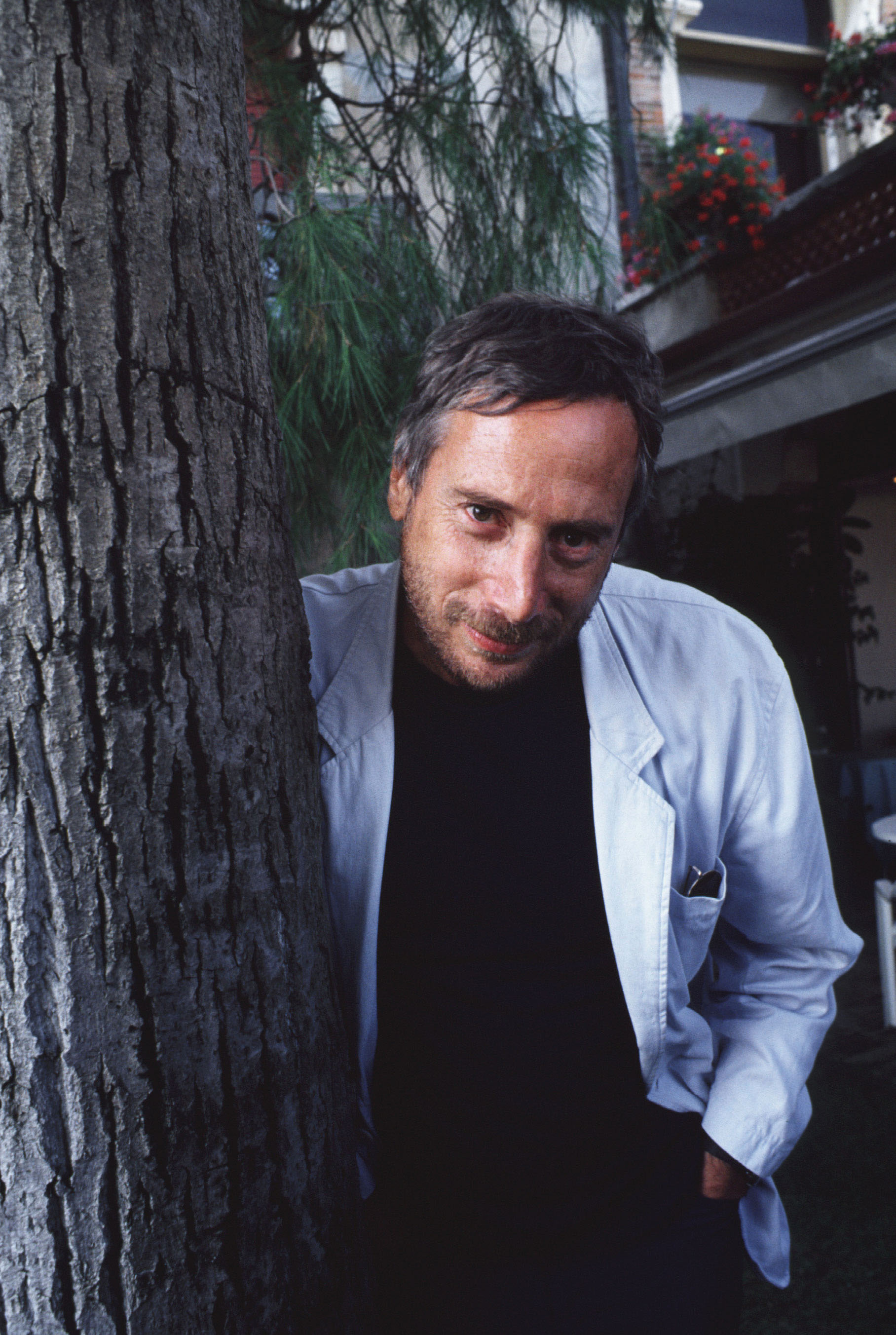
- Born: 29 July 1943; San Francisco, California
- Died: 31 May 2021 (aged 77); Rome, Italy
- Occupations: Film director Screenwriter
- Years active: 1969–2021

Peter Del Monte (29 July 1943 – 31 May 2021) was an Italian film director and screenwriter. He directed fifteen films between 1969 and 2021. His 1982 film Invitation au voyage won the prize for the Best Artistic Contribution at the 1982 Cannes Film Festival.

== Filmography ==
- Fuoricampo (1969)
- Le parole a venire (1970)
- Le ultime lettere di Jacopo Ortis (1973)
- Irene, Irene (1975)
- L'altra donna (1980)
- Sweet Pea (1981)
- Invitation au voyage (1982)
- Little Flames (1985)
- Julia and Julia (1987)
- Etoile (1988)
- Traces of an Amorous Life (1990)
- Traveling Companion (1996)
- The Ballad of the Windshield Washers (1998)
- Against the Wind (2000)
- In Your Hands (2007)
- No one Can Brush My Hair Like the Wind (2014)
