= 30th Venice International Film Festival =

Italian film festival in 1969

- Location: Venice, Italy
- Founded: 1932
- Artistic director: Ernesto G. Laura
- Festival date: 23 August – 5 September 1969
- Website: Website

Venice Film Festival chronology
- 31st 29th

The 30th annual Venice International Film Festival was held from 23 August to 5 September 1969. There was no jury because from 1969 to 1979 the festival was not competitive.

== Official Selections ==
The following films were selected to be screened:

=== Main selection ===
English title	Original title	Director(s)	Production country
The Ambush	Zaseda	Živojin Pavlović	Yugoslavia
Benito Cereno		Serge Roullet	France
Boy	少年	Nagisa Ōshima	Japan
Cardillac		Edgar Reitz	West Germany
Children's Games		Walter Welebit	United States
Day Stars	Дневные звёзды	Igor Talankin	Soviet Union
An Event	Događaj	Vatroslav Mimica	Yugoslavia
The Father	Fadern	Alf Sjöberg	Sweden
Fellini Satyricon		Federico Fellini	Italy
The First Charge of the Machete	La primera carga al machete	Manuel Octavio Gómez	Cuba
Forbidden Ground	Tiltott terület	Pál Gábor	Hungary
Génius		Štefan Uher	Czechoslovakia
The Heirs	Os Herdeiros	Carlos Diegues	Brazil
Honor and Glory	Čest a sláva	Hynek Bočan	Czechoslovakia
Love and Other Solitudes	Del amor y otras soledades	Basilio Martín Patino	Spain
Paulina Is Leaving	Paulina s'en va	André Téchiné	France
Pigsty	Porcile	Pier Paolo Pasolini	Italy
Prologue		Robin Spry	Canada
Sierra Maestra		Ansano Giannarelli	Italy
Subject for a Short Story	Сюжет для небольшого рассказа	Sergei Yutkevich	Soviet Union, France
Sweet Hunters	Ternos caçadores	Ruy Guerra	Portugal
Two Gentlemen Sharing		Ted Kotcheff	United Kingdom
Blood of the Condor	Yawar mallku	Jorge Sanjinés	Bolivia
Under the Sign of Scorpio	Sotto il segno dello scorpione	Paolo and Vittorio Taviani	Italy
A Very Curious Girl	La fiancée du pirate	Nelly Kaplan	France
Winter Wind	Sirokkó	Miklós Jancsó	Hungary

=== Informativa ===
English title	Original title	Director(s)	Production country
The Axe	Baltagul	Mircea Muresan	Romania
Bhuvan Shome		Mrinal Sen	India
Double Suicide	心中天網島	Masahiro Shinoda	Japan
A Gentle Woman	Une femme douce	Robert Bresson	France
The Gladiators	Gladiatorerna	Peter Watkins	Sweden
Glory Day	La sua giornata di gloria	Edoardo Bruno	Italy
L'indiscret		François Reichenbach	France, West Germany
Macunaima		Joaquim Pedro de Andrade	Brazil
Rose Spot	Una macchia rosa	Enzo Muzii	Italy
Salesman		Albert Maysles, David Maysles, Charlotte Zwerin	United States
Story of a Girl Alone	Historia de una chica sola	Jorge Grau	Spain
The Year of the Cannibals	I cannibali	Liliana Cavani	Italy
A Woman's Case	Mikreh Isha	Jacques Katmor	Israel

== Awards ==
=== Omaggio per il complesso dell'opera ===
The Omaggio per il complesso dell'opera (a lifetime achievement award) was awarded to Luis Buñuel.

=== Pasinetti Award ===
- Best Foreign Film: Cest a sláva by Hynek Bocan
- Best Italian Film: Fellini Satyricon by Federico Fellini

=== CIDALC Award ===
- Zaseda by Zivojin Pavlovic

=== Golden Rudder ===
- Blood of the Condor by Jorge Sanjinés

=== Luis Buñuel Award ===
- La primera carga al machete by Manuel Octavio Gómez
