= 31st Venice International Film Festival =

Italian film festival in 1970

- Festival poster
- Location: Venice, Italy
- Founded: 1932
- Festival date: 19 August – 1 September 1970
- Website: Website

Venice Film Festival chronology
- 32nd 30th

The 31st annual Venice International Film Festival was held from 19 August to 1 September 1970. There was no jury because from 1969 to 1979 the festival was not competitive.

== Official Selections ==
The following films were selected to be screened:

=== Main selection ===
English title	Original title	Director(s)	Production country
Bube u glavi		Miloš Radivojević	Yugoslavia
Crime and Punishment	Преступление и наказание	Lev Kulidzhanov	Soviet Union
Deep End		Jerzy Skolimowski	West Germany, United Kingdom
Kesäkapina		Jaakko Pakkasvirta	Finland
The Lion Has Seven Heads	Der Leone Have Sept Cabeças	Glauber Rocha	Brazil
Lokis	Lokis. Rekopis profesora Wittembacha	Janusz Majewski	Poland
Lovefilm	Szerelmesfilm	István Szabó	Hungary
The Mad Heart	Le coeur fou	Jean-Gabriel Albicocco	France
The Man in Hiding	El hombre oculto	Alfonso Ungría	Spain
Mr. President	El señor Presidente	Marcos Madanes	Argentina
Mortal Sin	Pecado mortal	Miguel Faria Jr.	Brazil
Petit à petit		Jean Rouch	France
The Spider's Stratagem	La strategia del ragno	Bernardo Bertolucci	Italy
Three Sisters		Laurence Olivier, John Sichel	United Kingdom
Wanda		Barbara Loden	United States
The Wedding Ring	L'Alliance	Christian de Chalonge	France

=== Special screenings ===
English title	Original title	Director(s)	Production country
Don Giovanni		Carmelo Bene	Italy
The Shadow Within	影の車	Yoshitaro Nomura	Japan
Urtain, el rey de la selva... o así		Manuel Summers	Spain

Fuori programma

English title	Original title	Director(s)	Production country
The Clowns	I Clowns	Federico Fellini	Italy
Socrates	Socrate	Roberto Rossellini	Italy

== Awards ==
=== Career award ===
The Omaggio per il complesso dell'opera (a lifetime achievement award that preceded the Golden Lion for Lifetime Achievement, was awarded to Orson Welles.

=== Pasinetti Award ===
- Best Foreign Film: Wanda by Barbara Loden
- Best Italian Film: The Clowns by Federico Fellini
