= Gelmetti =

Gelmetti is a surname. Notable people with the surname include:

- Gianluigi Gelmetti (1945–2021), Italian-Monégasque conductor and composer
- Vittorio Gelmetti (1926-1992), Italian composer
