= Wanda (film) =

1970 film by Barbara Loden

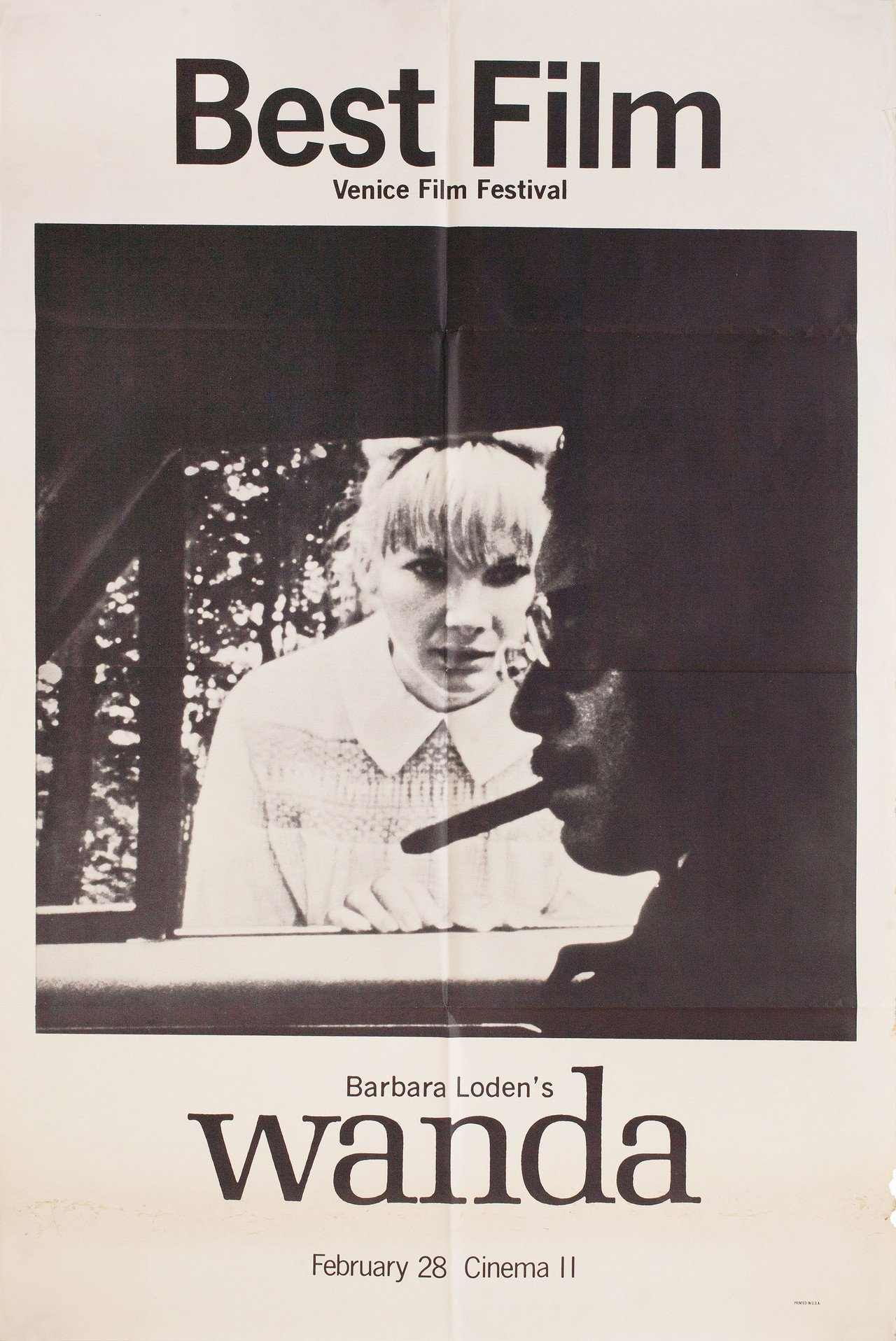
- American theatrical poster
- Directed by: Barbara Loden
- Written by: Barbara Loden
- Produced by: Harry Shuster; Barbara Loden
- Starring: Barbara Loden; Michael Higgins
- Cinematography: Nicholas Proferes
- Edited by: Nicholas Proferes
- Music by: Dave Mullaney (uncredited)
- Production company: Foundation for Filmmakers
- Distributed by: Bardene International Films
- Release dates: September 1, 1970 (Venice); February 28, 1971 (United States)
- Running time: 103 minutes
- Country: United States
- Language: English
- Budget: c. $115,000

Wanda is a 1970 American independent drama film written and directed by Barbara Loden, who also stars in the title role. Set in the anthracite coal region of eastern Pennsylvania, the film focuses on an apathetic woman with limited options who inadvertently goes on the run with a bank robber.

Inspired by her own past feelings of aimlessness, as well as a newspaper article detailing a woman's participation in a bank robbery, Loden wrote the screenplay for Wanda before securing financing through Harry Shuster, a Los Angeles–based producer. The film was shot on location with a small crew of around seven people, primarily in eastern Pennsylvania and Connecticut, and much of the dialog and filming was improvised, with Loden only loosely referring to the screenplay.

Wanda was chosen for the 31st Venice International Film Festival, where it won the Pasinetti Award for Best Foreign Film. A restored version of the film was screened out of competition at the 67th Venice International Film Festival in 2010. In 2017, the film was selected for preservation in the United States National Film Registry by the Library of Congress for being "culturally, historically, or aesthetically significant".

== Plot ==
Wanda Goronski, an unhappy housewife from rural eastern Pennsylvania, stays on her sister’s couch after leaving her husband. After walking across a coal field and hitching a ride, she arrives late to a divorce court hearing, relinquishes her rights to her children, and grants her husband a divorce.

After losing her job at a sewing factory, Wanda runs away with a man she had a one-night stand with, only for him to abandon her at an ice cream shop. Nearly penniless, she takes a nap in a movie theater, where she is robbed while asleep. Desperate, she goes to a bar to use the restroom and clings to an older man she mistakes for the bartender. The man, Norman Dennis, is a criminal in the process of robbing the bar. Unable to shake Wanda off, he takes her on the run with him. Even after learning about his criminal lifestyle, Wanda decides to stay with Norman, whom she calls "Mr. Dennis."

Wanda spends some time on the road with Norman, during which he becomes physically and emotionally abusive. He sends her to a mall to shop for new clothes while he robs cars in the parking lot. Later, they visit the Holy Land USA theme park, where Norman meets his Evangelical Christian father, to whom he shows unusual courtesy and respect. Afterward, Norman convinces Wanda to act as his accomplice for a kidnapping and getaway driver for a bank robbery. The robbery goes wrong, and Norman is shot in the lobby, dying a short time later in hospital. Wanda arrives late and watches from the street as police swarm the scene and onlookers gather.

Once again alone, Wanda hitchhikes with a man who attempts to sexually assault her. She escapes and flees through the woods. At nightfall, she stumbles upon a backwoods roadhouse, where strangers offer her food, alcohol, and cigarettes.

== Cast ==
- Barbara Loden as Wanda Goronski
- Michael Higgins as Norman Dennis
- Frank Jourdano as The soldier
- Valerie Manches as The girl in the roadhouse
- Dorothy Shupenes as Wanda's sister
- Peter Shupenes as Wanda's brother-in-law
- Jerome Thier as Wanda's husband
- Marian Thier as Miss Godek
- Anthony Rotell as Tony
- M. L. Kennedy as Judge

== Production ==
=== Concept ===
Loden said the film was semi-autobiographical and that she was inspired to write it after reading a newspaper report that a woman had thanked a judge after he sentenced her to 20 years in prison for her participation in a bank robbery. Her husband Elia Kazan claimed to have written the initial script and then Loden "rewrote it many times, and it became hers."

According to Loden, the character of Wanda was "created out of herself." In a 1971 interview, she said, "It was sort of based on my own personality...A sort of passive, wandering around, passing from one person to another, no direction—I spent many years of my life that way and I felt that... well, I think that a lot of people are that way. And not just women, but men too. They don't know why they exist." In crafting the relationship between Wanda and Norman, Loden avoided integrating any legitimate romance between the characters, as she felt it was unrealistic. Wanda's complete submissiveness to Norman was also partly inspired by a nonfiction book Loden had read about the upbringings of several prostitutes, one of whom recounted finding joy in her foster mother's severe overbearingness, as she was "the first person who ever told [her] what to do. She appreciated it, even though the woman was mean."

=== Filming ===
"I don't see how anybody can predetermine how their movie is going to turn out, or why anybody would want to, because it's a creative thing that is changing every day, and you're changing every day while you work on it. You start to make a movie, and when you finish it you'll be a different person."

— Loden speaking at the American Film Institute, 1971

The film was shot on 16mm stock, on a budget of roughly $100,000 (Note: Contemporaneous newspaper sources state a budget of $100,000, though the American Film Institute notes an estimated $115,000 budget.) with a crew of four: Loden, cinematographer Nicholas Proferes, who also edited the film, Lars Hedman doing lighting and sound, and production assistant Christopher Cromin. Loden and Michael Higgins were the only two professional actors in the production and most of their scenes were a result of improvisation. Loden recalled the logistics of the production as difficult, and said she ended up "using the [actors] as they were" and quit referring to the script shortly after beginning. Loden worked for union scale, and Higgins's costumes came from Kazan's castoffs. Loden said the film's visual style was inspired by several Andy Warhol films.

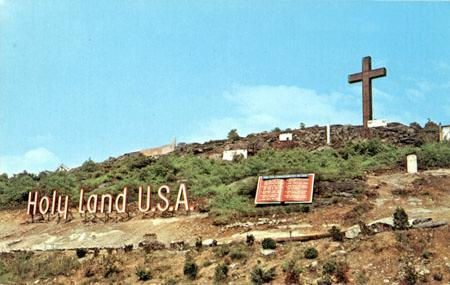
A sequence in the film was shot at the Holy Land USA theme park in Waterbury, Connecticut

The film was financed by Harry Shuster, who formed Bardene International Films specifically to distribute it. Shuster had a one-third interest in the film; the other two-thirds was held by Loden, Kazan, and attorney Milton Kazan's nonprofit Foundation for Filmmakers. Any profits after recoupment that went to the foundation were to be put into a fund to finance future films.

Originally slated to be set in the South, the high cost of filming there and the production's need to be near the film processing houses in New York City prompted a change to the coal-mining regions of Pennsylvania. Location shooting took place in fall 1969 in Scranton, Pennsylvania, Carbondale, Pennsylvania, and Waterbury, Connecticut. Several of the performers in the film were non-actors who were arbitrarily asked to partake in the film; among these are the man Wanda speaks with in the film's opening sequence on the coal field, as well as the actor portraying Norman's father, whom Loden and Proferes invited to play the part after finding him in a retirement home in Carbondale. The final scene was filmed at an actual roadhouse in Sandy Hook, Connecticut. Loden filmed an alternate ending in which Wanda is accosted by the police at the roadhouse, but she ultimately deemed it "too corny" and opted to conclude the film with a morose Wanda being regaled by the tavern patrons.

Post-production of Wanda occurred in Loden's home.

== Release ==
Wanda premiered at the 31st Venice International Film Festival, where it was the only American entry and won the International Critics' Prize for Best Film. It was also exhibited at the London Film Festival and the San Francisco Film Festival.

=== Restoration ===
In 2007, the Hollywood Film and Video laboratory in Los Angeles formally closed, and began purging film elements from its archive dating to the 1950s. The original 16mm Kodak Ektachrome ECB film elements of Wanda were uncovered during this purging, and subsequently acquired by the UCLA Film & Television Archive, saving them from being disposed of in a landfill. The film elements were restored, and the film was subsequently screened at the Museum of Modern Art in 2010.

In August 2018, the film was re-released theatrically in Los Angeles.

=== Home media ===
Wanda was released on DVD in 2006 by Parlour Pictures. In December 2018, the Criterion Collection announced it was releasing the film on Blu-ray and DVD on March 19, 2019.

== Reception and legacy ==
In Loden's recollection, European critics who saw the film at its Venice Film Festival premiere interpreted it as a political statement on the existential nature of American life, which she refuted. Critics Judith Crist, Kathleen Carroll, and Pauline Kael wrote unfavorably of the film, recounted by Loden as they disliked the protagonist for being "dumb, and stupid, and all the things people used to say about me... I think they're jealous, I really do... They were so vicious, it went over call of duty."

Upon its American theatrical release in 1971, the New York Daily News awarded the film two and a half out of four stars, noting Wanda as a "sharply-etched" character, but concluded that the film "remains a rather pointless dirge, for there never is any question that Wanda will end her journey from no-place to nowhere." Jean Dietrich of the Louisville Courier-Journal praised the film for its portrayal of its characters, writing: "Wanda is a classic loser, underprivileged and underintelligent, who, in her hopelessness, turns to prostitution. Miss Loden's performance of this pathetic creature will stick with me, I think, forever...nothing is more depressing than empty, stunted lives, and Miss Loden shows a sincere concern in recording them so honestly."

Stanley Kauffmann of The New Republic called Wanda "a small, good work of art".

The Hackensack Record's John Crittenden praised Loden's performance but felt the film would not resonate with many American moviegoers: "Sitting in judgment of the character, as audiences are apt to do, I doubt anyone will really like Wanda and sympathize with her. Nobody likes a victim."

The film is a favorite of actress Isabelle Huppert, who championed its release on DVD in France in 2004. The film has also been cited as a favorite by filmmaker John Waters, who presented it as his annual selection within the 2012 Maryland Film Festival. Wim Wenders selected it as one of his choices from his appearance on the Criterion Closet video series.

The film was restored by the UCLA Film & Television Archive with funding provided by The Film Foundation and Gucci, and screened at the 67th Venice International Film Festival. The film has a 92% approval rating on Rotten Tomatoes, based on 36 reviews.

In a retrospective review, Justin Chang of the Los Angeles Times wrote: "To say that Wanda deglamorizes the American crime film is both entirely accurate and something of an understatement. Loden’s first and only film as a director is a searingly honest character study whose jagged, unvarnished aesthetic—inspired in part by Jean-Luc Godard’s Breathless and the films of Andy Warhol—stood in stark contrast to the slick Hollywood dramatic tradition epitomized by, among others, Loden’s husband, the director Elia Kazan."

In 2022, the film appeared on Sight and Sound's critics poll for the Top 100 Films of All Time, tied for #48.

== Awards and honors ==
Year	Institution/Award	Category	Result	Ref.
1970	Venice Film Festival	Best Foreign Film	Won	
