= His Day of Glory =

1969 film

- Directed by: Edoardo Bruno
- Written by: Edoardo Bruno
- Starring: Carlo Cecchi
- Cinematography: Romano Scavolini
- Edited by: Edoardo Bruno
- Music by: Vittorio Gelmetti
- Release date: 1969
- Running time: 82 minutes
- Country: Italy
- Language: Italian

His Day of Glory (Italian: La sua giornata di gloria) is a 1969 Italian drama film directed by Edoardo Bruno. It was entered into the 19th Berlin International Film Festival.

== Cast ==
- Carlo Cecchi - Claude
- Maria Manuela Carrilho - Marguerite
- Raúl Martínez - Richard
- Sergio Serafini - Michele
- Alberto Hammermann - Paul
- Angelica Ippolito - Anita
- Luigi Antonio Guerra - Mario (as Luigi Guerra)
- Umberto Silva
- Philippe Leroy - The Commander
- Pierre Clémenti - Introduction
