= Antonio Salines =

Italian actor and director (1936–2021)

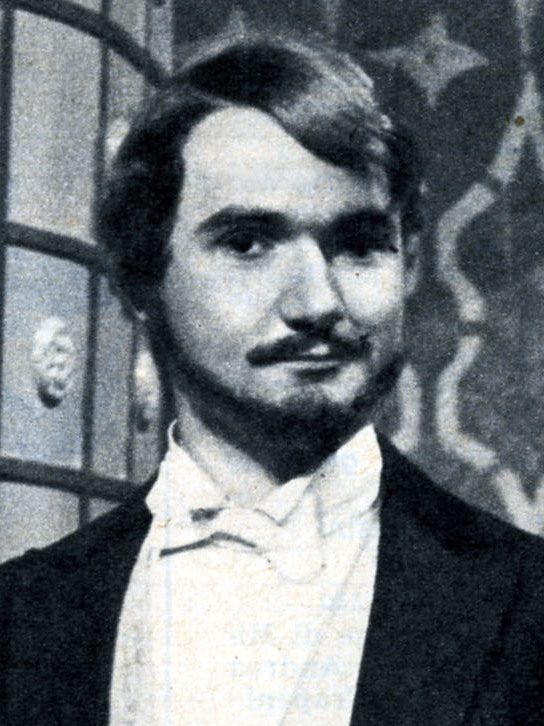
- Salines in 1963
- Born: 1 July 1936; La Spezia, Italy
- Died: 22 June 2021 (aged 84); Rome, Italy

Antonio Salines (1 July 1936 – 22 June 2021) was an Italian actor and director.

== Biography ==
Born in La Spezia, the son of the composer Enrico, at ten years old Salines started his career as a child actor, appearing in several stage works in the theatrical company of Franco Sportelli. In 1959 he graduated from the Silvio D'Amico Academy of Dramatic Arts in Rome, and in 1960 he entered the stage company of Vittorio Gassman. Alongside a busy career on stage, Salines has appeared in a large number of television movies and series and in several films. Salines was also a stage director, and in 1991 he directed the film Zio Vanja, based on Anton Chekhov's Uncle Vanya. He was married to the actress Flavia Milante. Salines died in Rome on 22 June 2021, aged 84.

== Filmography ==
- Sierra Maestra (1969) - Franco
- Matalo! (1970) - Ted
- La stirpe di Caino (1971)
- Non ho tempo (1973)
- The Gamecock (1974) - Carlo Amatriciani
- Liebeskonzil (1982) - Teufel / Dr. Panizza
- Un marziano a Roma (1983)
- Zio Vania di Anton Cechov (1990) - Ivan Petrovich Voinitsky (Uncle Vanya)
- The Voyeur (1994) - Doctor
- Monella (1998) - Pepè
- Trasgredire (2000)
- Sister Smile (2001) - Vitale
- Senso '45 (2002) - Carlo
- Fallo! (2003) - Mr. Noel (episode "Honni soit qui mal y pense" in Cap d'Agde)
- Terapia Roosevelt (2006)
- I nostri ragazzi (2014)
- Spectre (2015) - Fiat Driver
- Los Feliz (2016) - Cardinal 1
- Happy as Lazzaro (2018) - Nicola anziano
