= Golden Lion for Lifetime Achievement =

Italian honorary award

- Leone d'oro alla carriera (Italian)
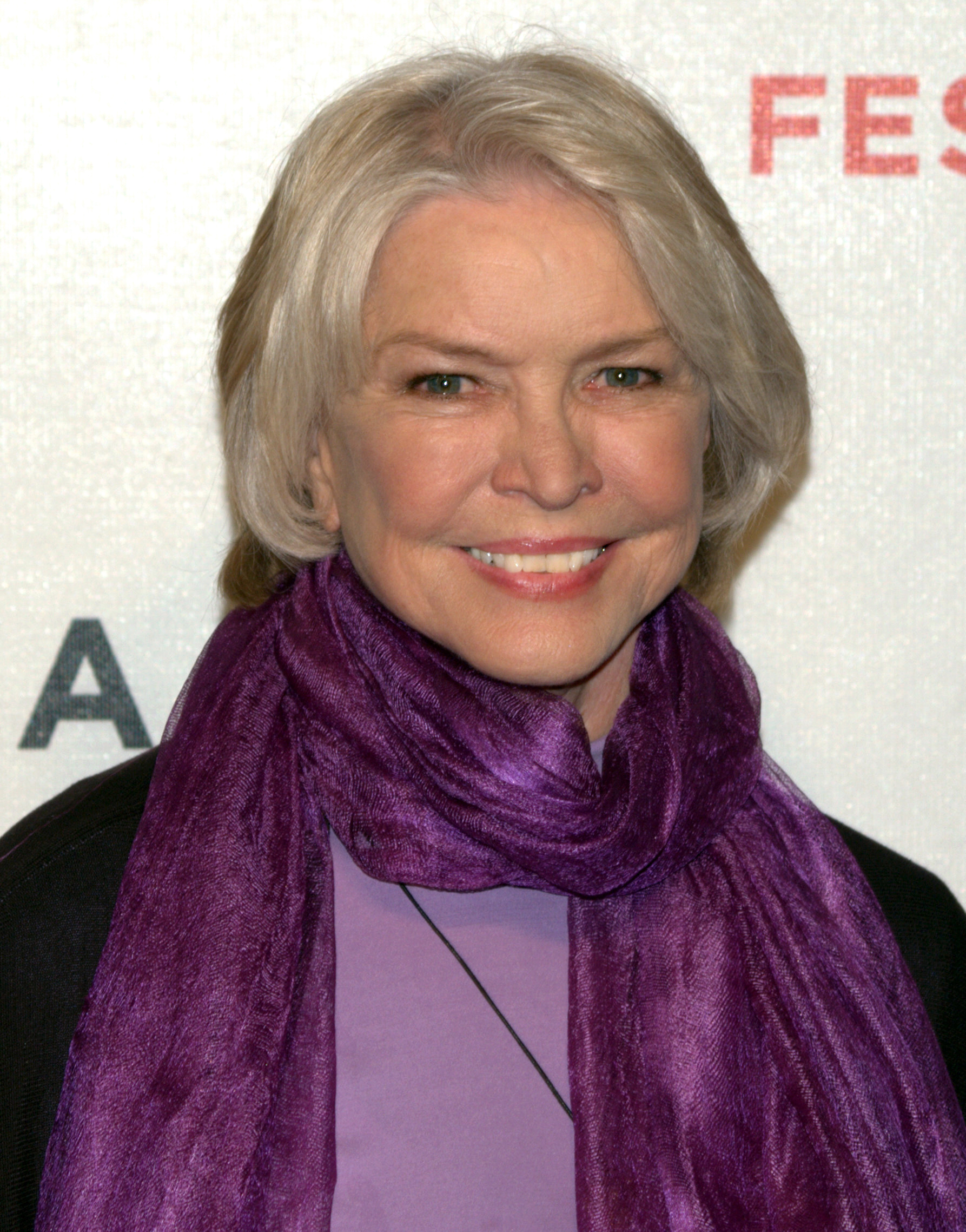
- 2026 recipients: Ellen Burstyn and George Clooney
- Location: Venice
- Country: Italy
- Presented by: Venice Film Festival
- First award: 1969
- Currently held by: Ellen Burstyn and George Clooney (2026)
- Website: labiennale.org/cinema

The Golden Lion for Lifetime Achievement (Italian: Leone d'oro alla carriera, lit. 'Career Golden Lion') is an award given at the Venice Film Festival. The award was established under this name in 1971, succeeding an equivalent prize, known as the Omaggio per il complesso dell'opera, awarded in 1969 and 1970. It is one of several Golden Lions given at the film festival as well as other festivals under the Venice Biennale umbrella.

The most recent recipients were American actors Ellen Burstyn and George Clooney at the 83rd Venice International Film Festival in 2026.

== History ==
The Golden Lion for Lifetime Achievement is awarded to directors, actors, and other personalities from the world of cinema who have distinguished themselves in the art. It joins the Golden Lion, the festival's highest prize, which is instead awarded to a film in competition.

Initially, tributes to an artist for a lifetime of work were given in the form of retrospectives. An equivalent prize, known as the Omaggio per il complesso dell'opera, was awarded in 1969 and 1970, Luis Buñuel and Orson Welles respectively.

The prize was established with its present name in 1971, with American director John Ford receiving the award. It was not given between 1973 and 1981, nor in 1984. In 1982, there were twelve winners.

Among the winners include filmmakers such as Charlie Chaplin, Orson Welles, Ingmar Bergman, Billy Wilder, Stanley Kubrick, Woody Allen, Martin Scorsese, Steven Spielberg, David Lynch, Hayao Miyazaki, and Pedro Almodovar and actors which include Sophia Loren, Catherine Deneuve, Robert De Niro, Dustin Hoffman, Jane Fonda, Al Pacino, Julie Andrews, and Tilda Swinton as well many other figures of international film.

== Recipients ==
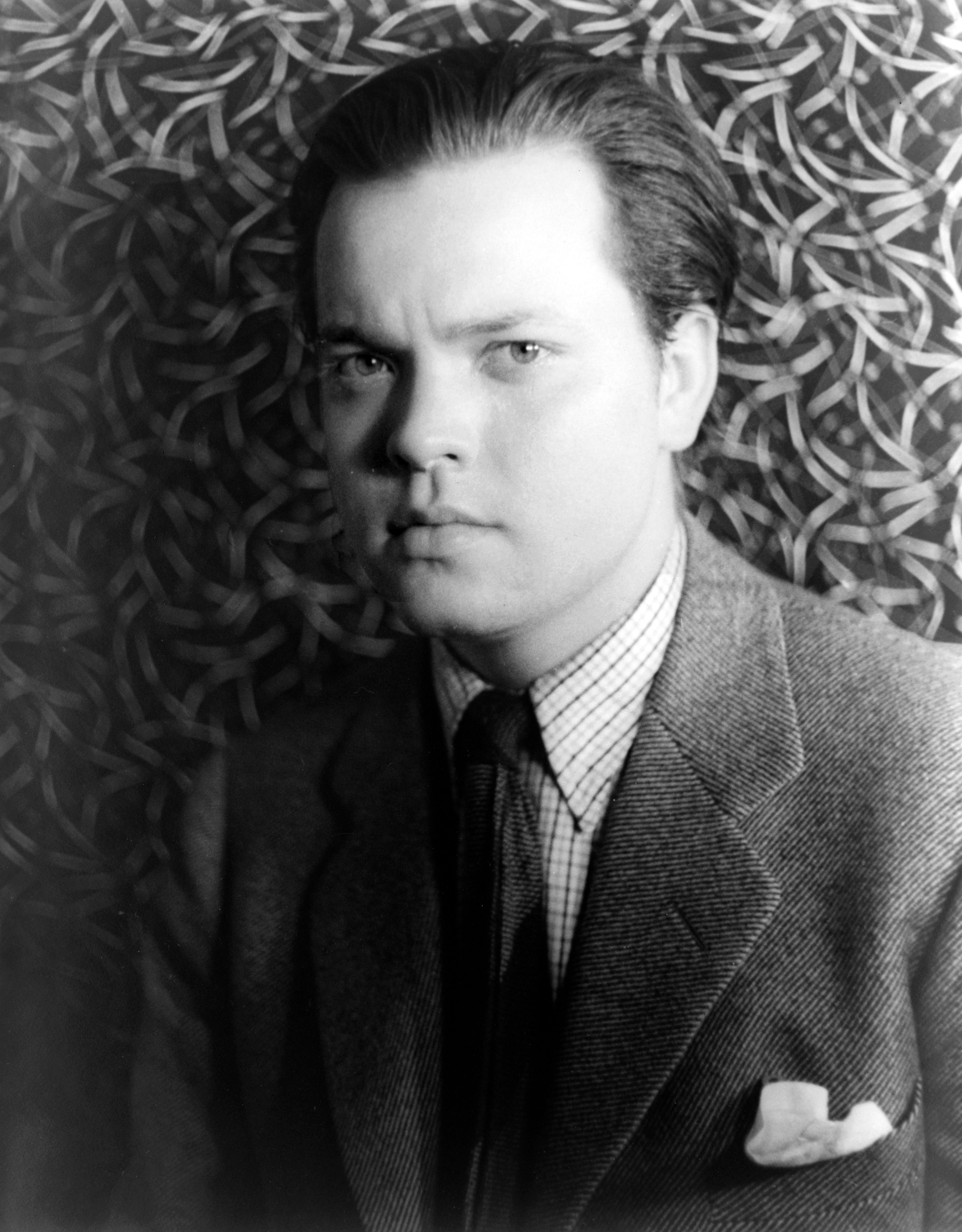
Orson Welles won in 1970.

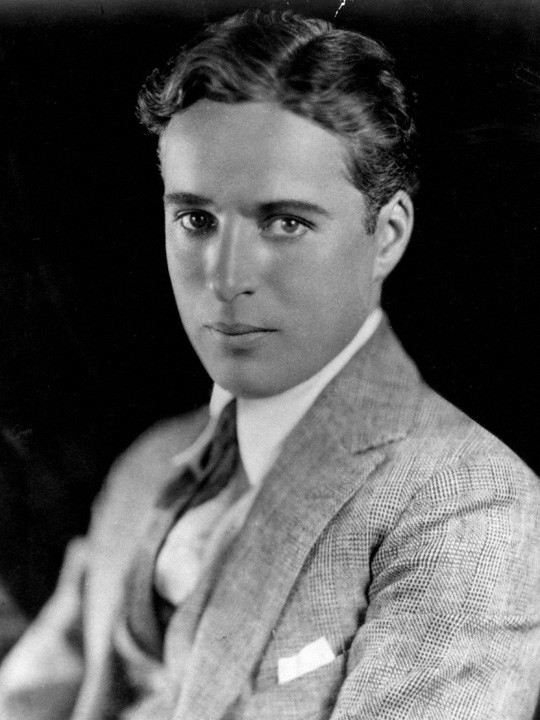
Charlie Chaplin won in 1971.

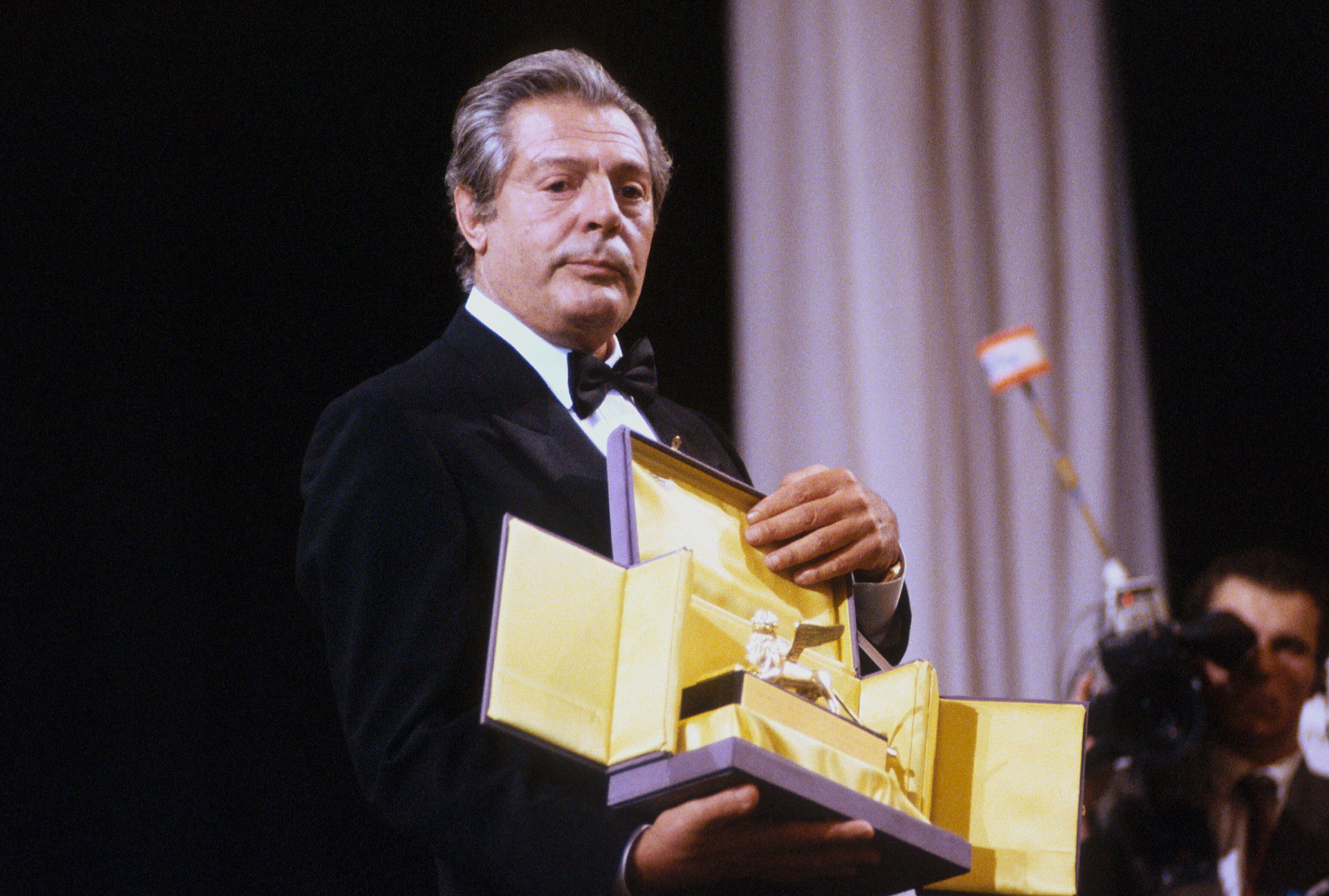
Marcello Mastroianni receiving the prize in 1990

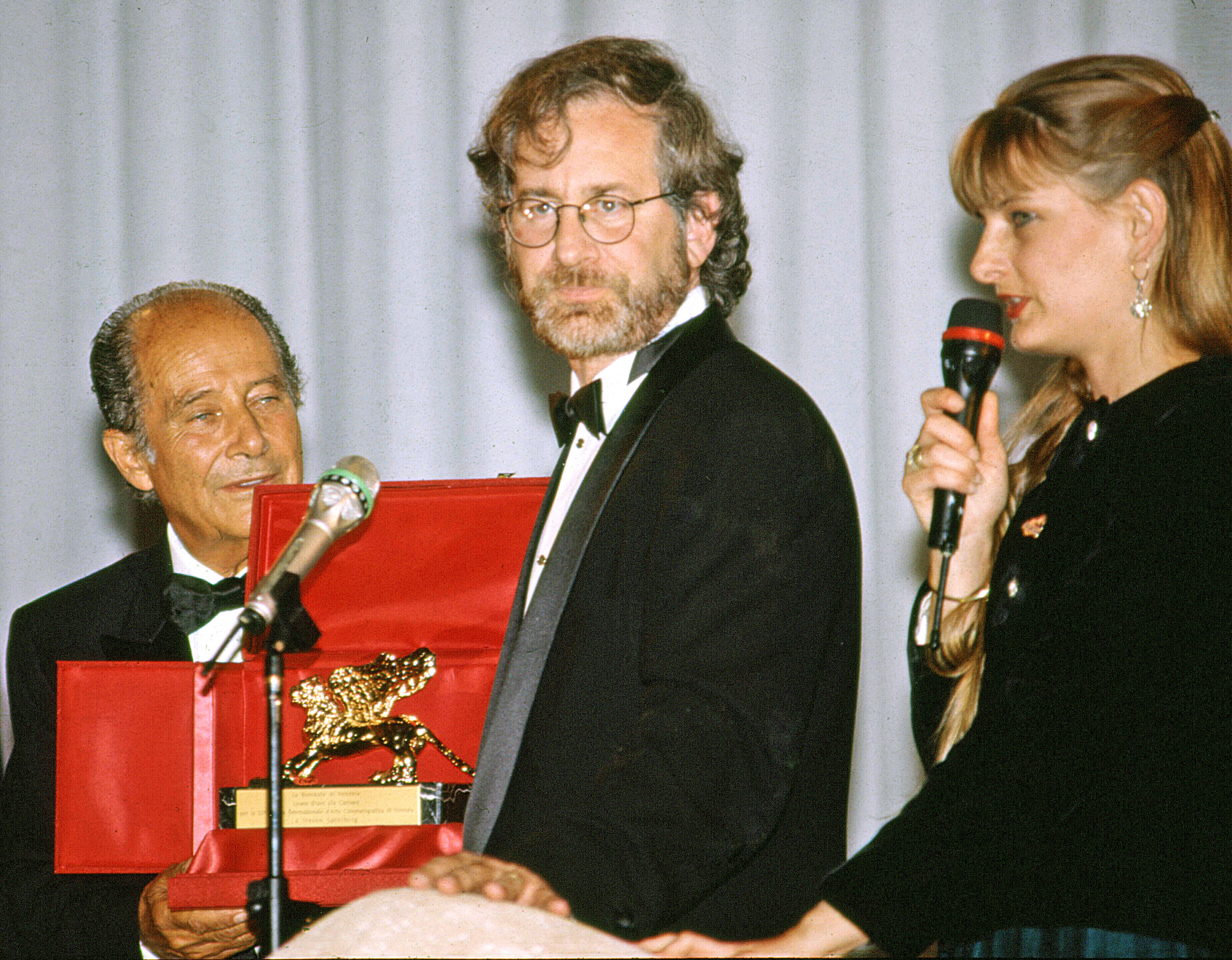
Steven Spielberg receiving the prize from Gillo Pontecorvo in 1993

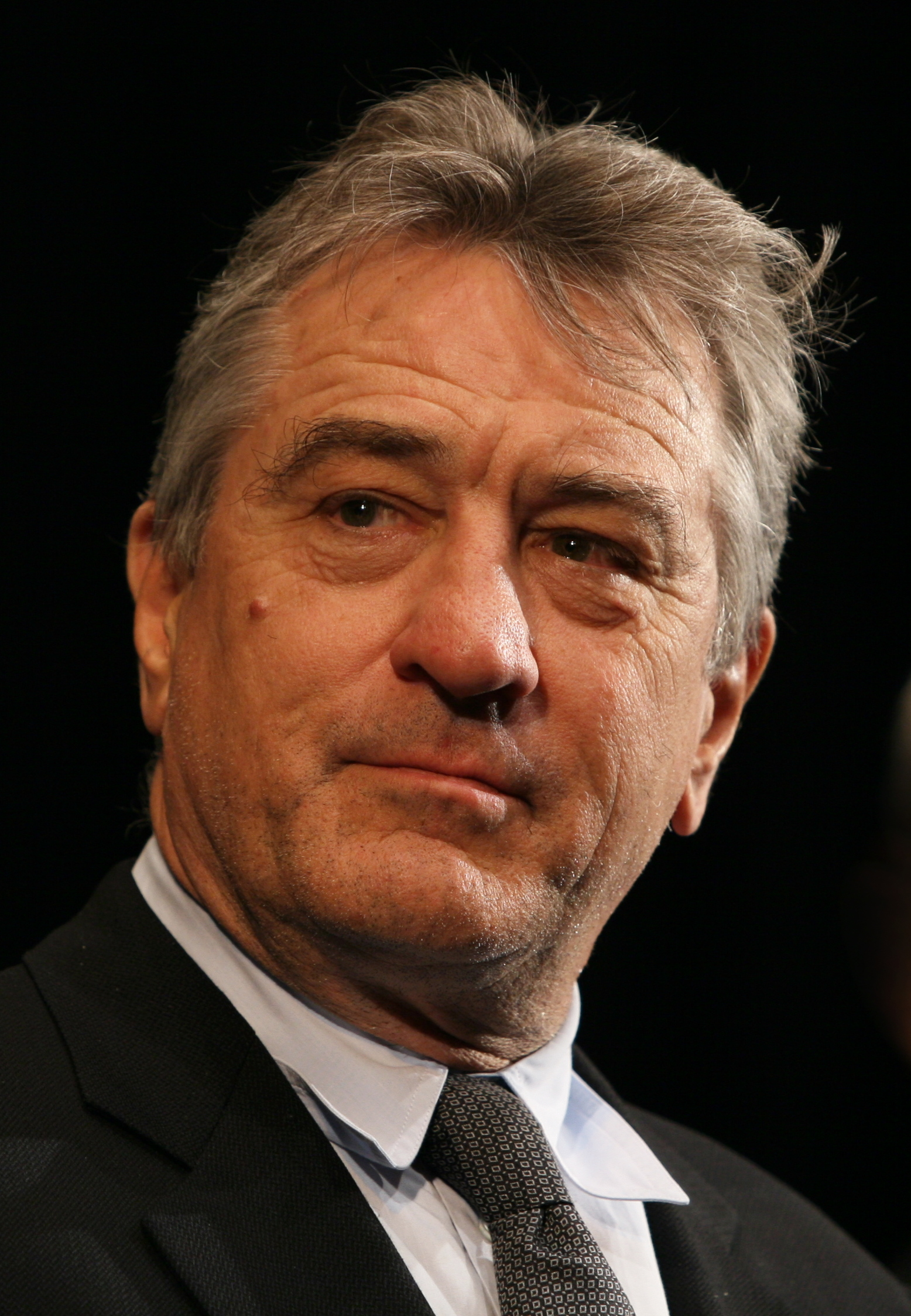
Robert De Niro won in 1993.

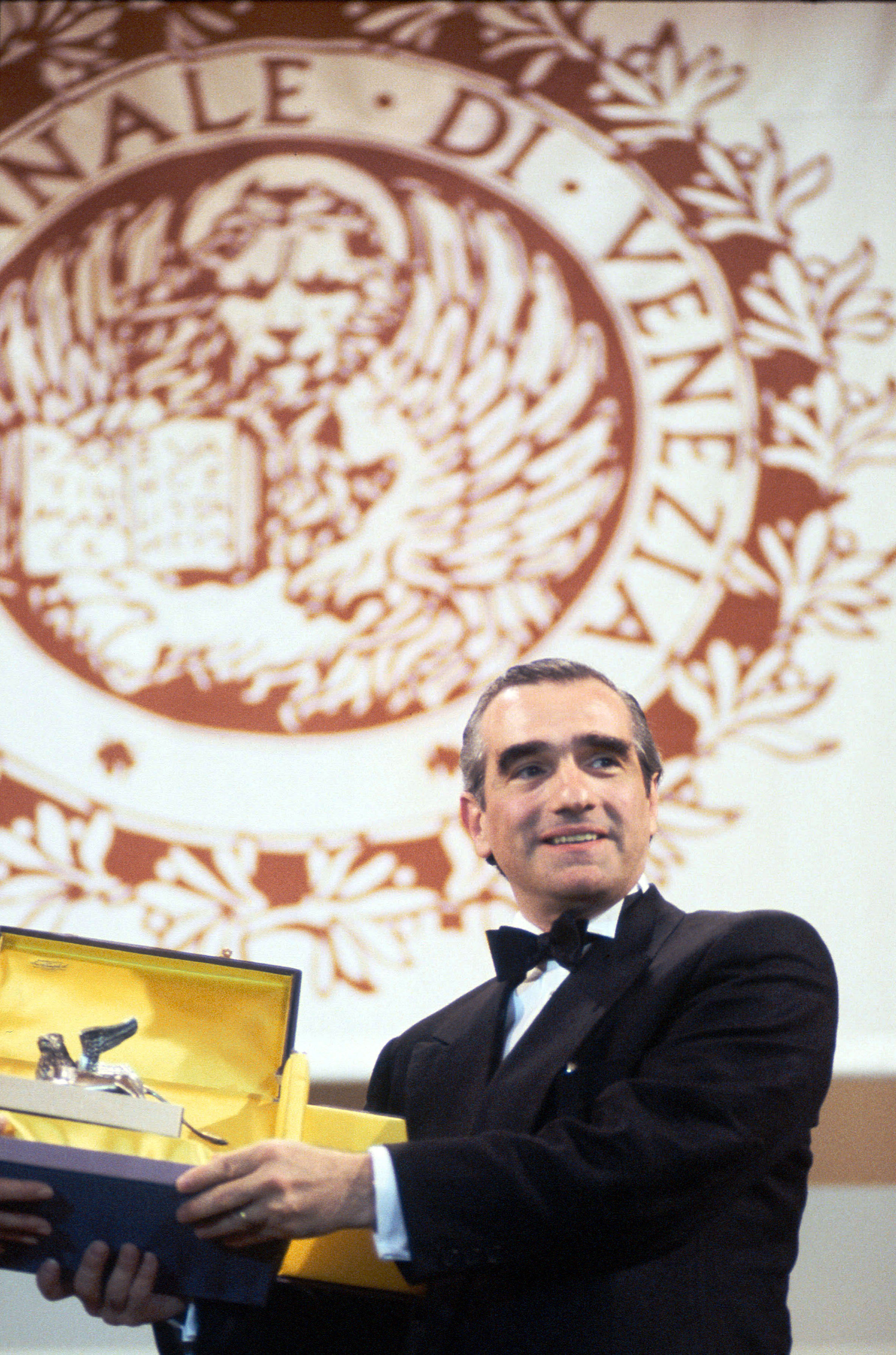
Martin Scorsese won in 1995.

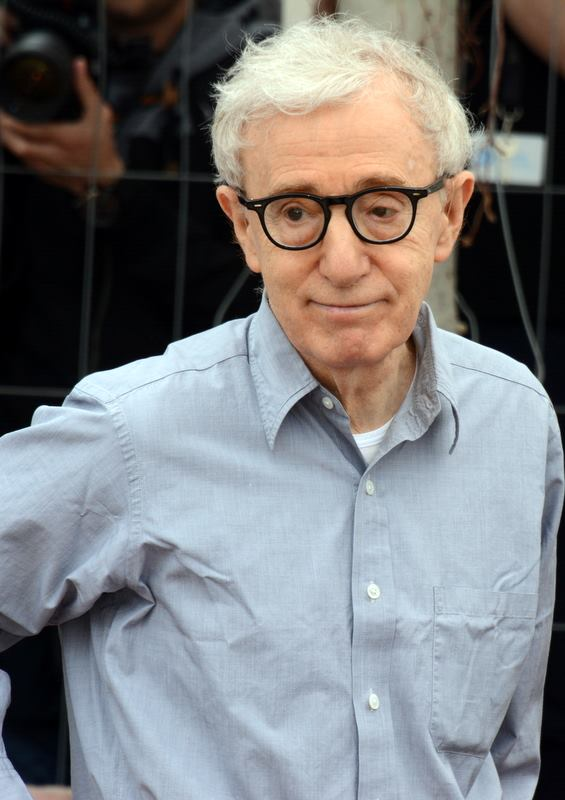
Woody Allen won in 1995.

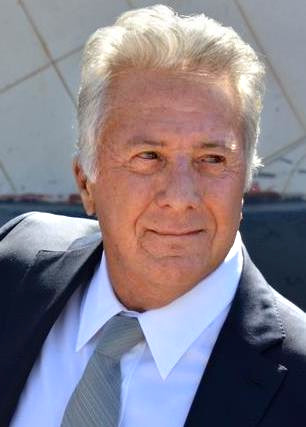
Dustin Hoffman won in 1996.

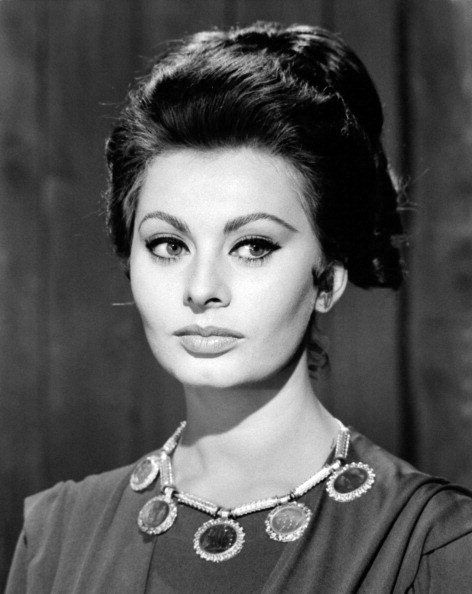
Sophia Loren won in 1998.

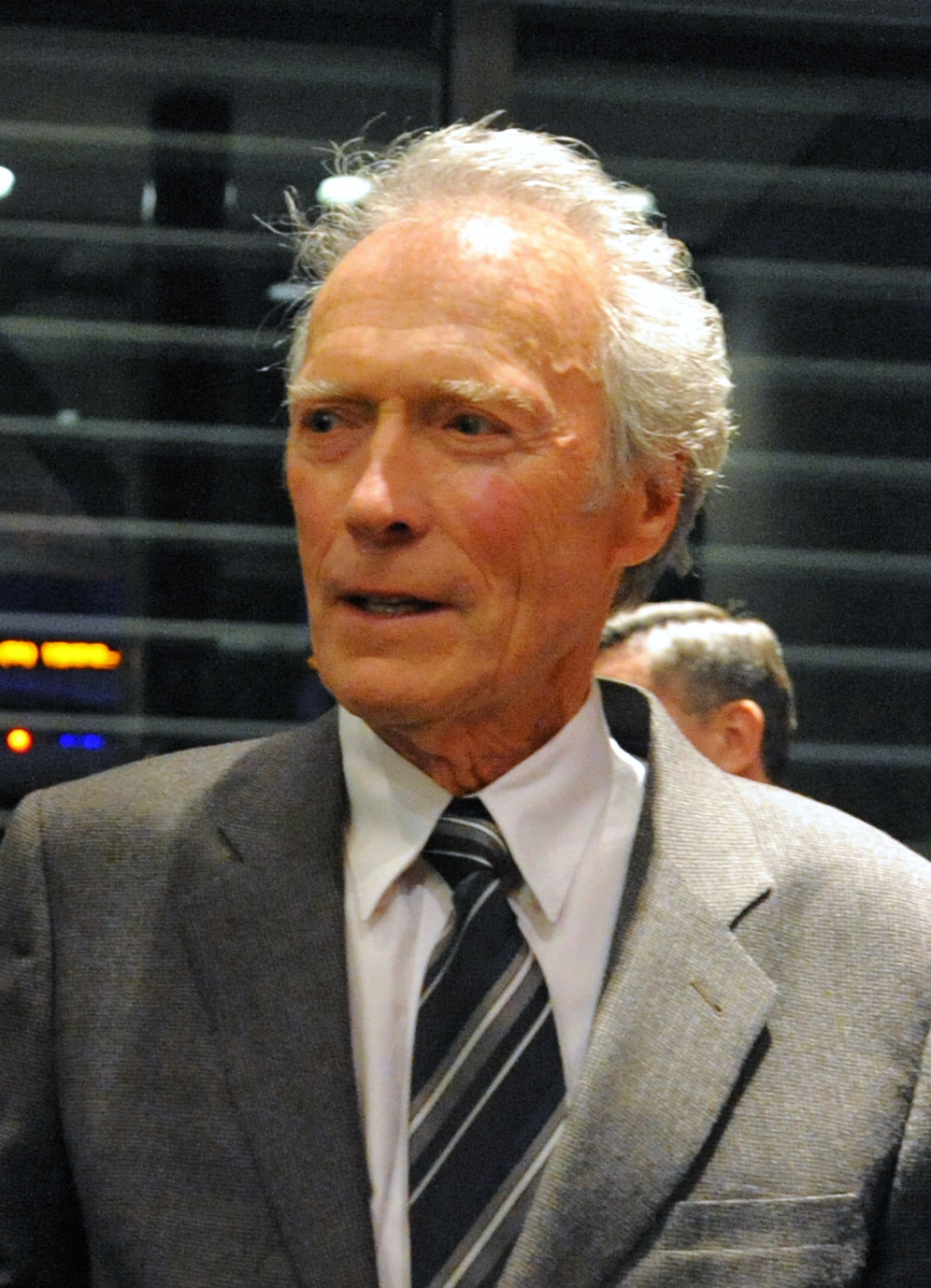
Clint Eastwood won in 2000.

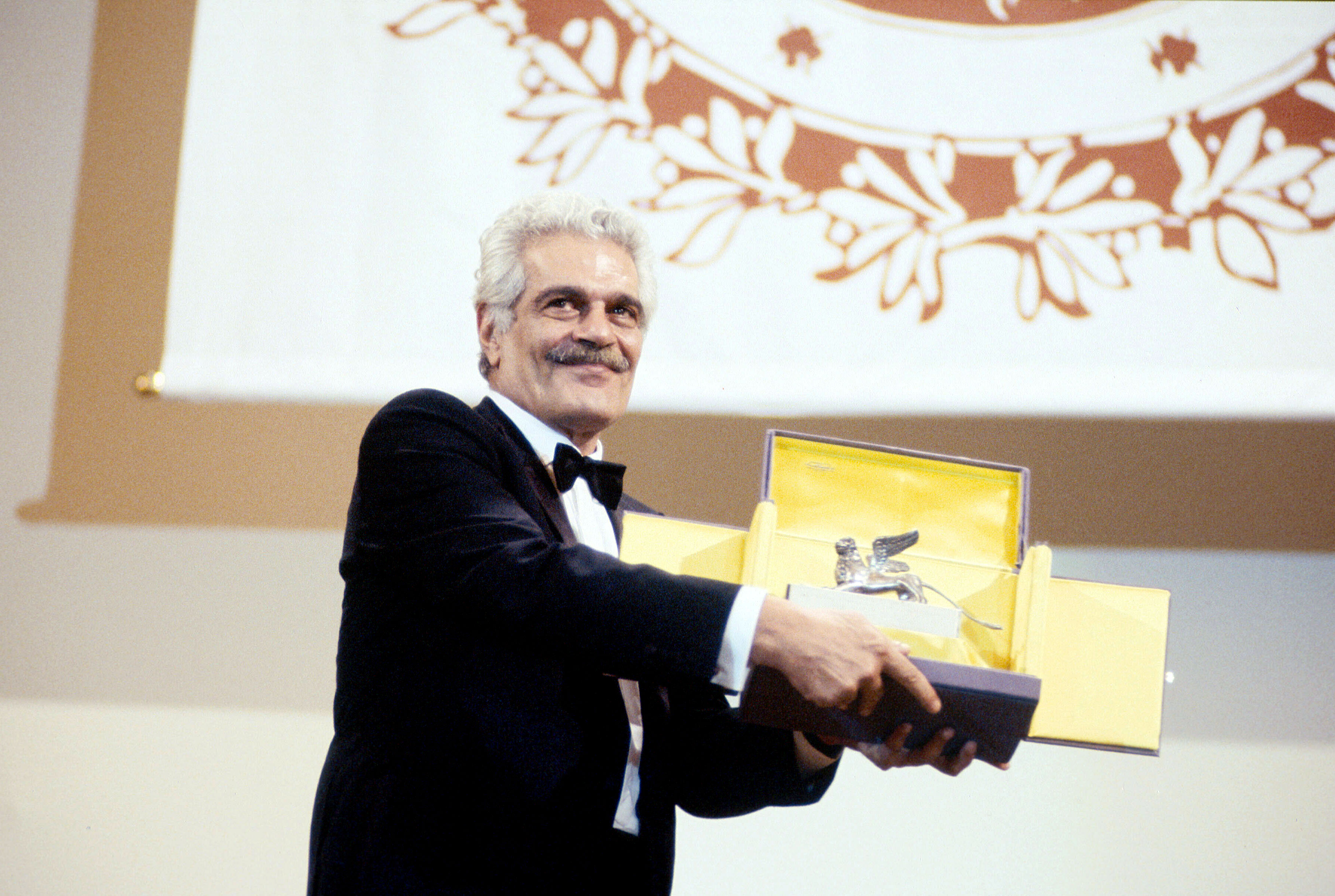
Omar Sharif receiving the prize in 2003

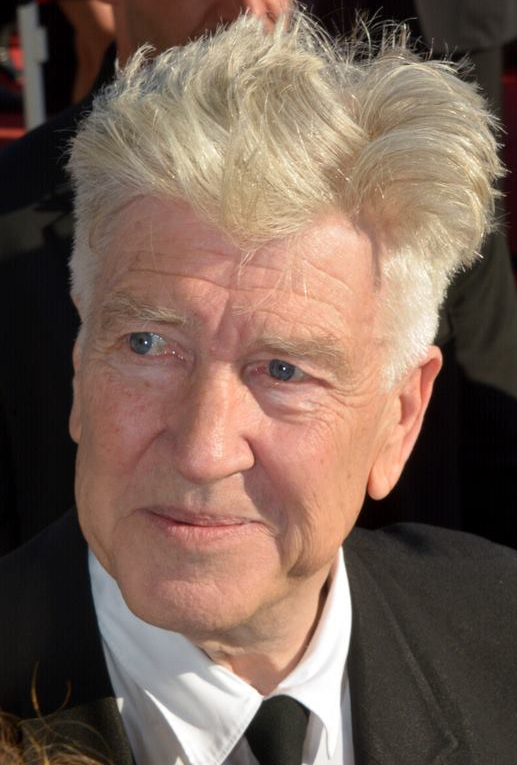
David Lynch won in 2006.

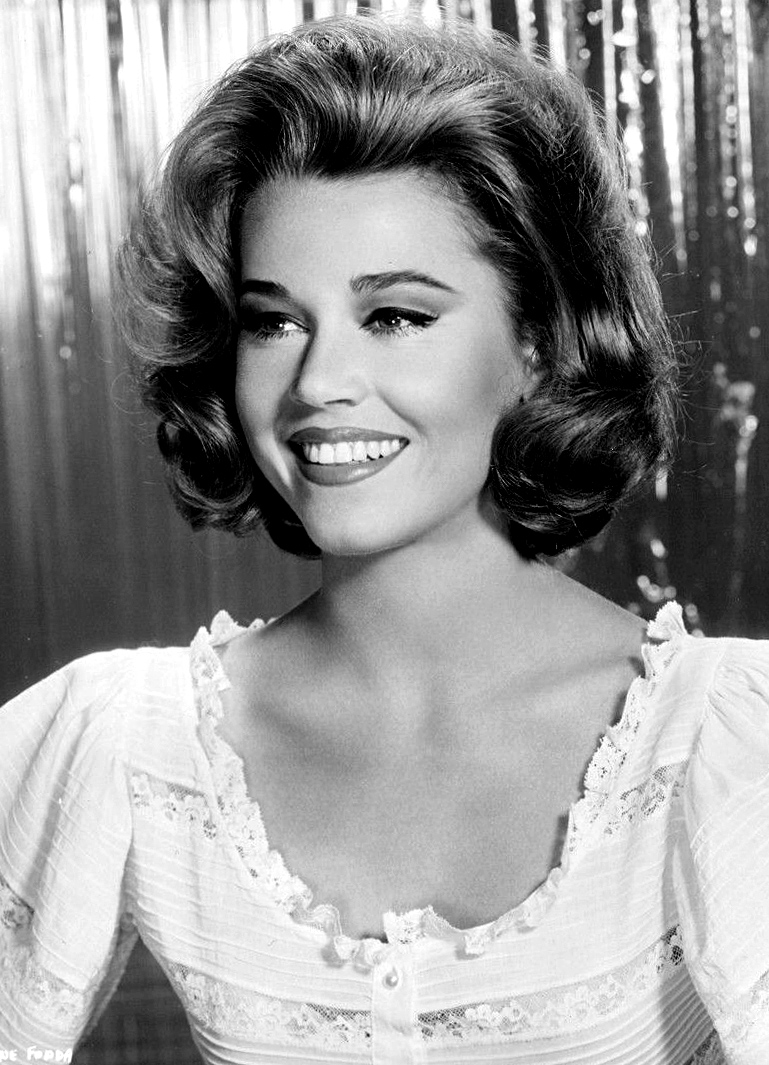
Jane Fonda won in 2017.

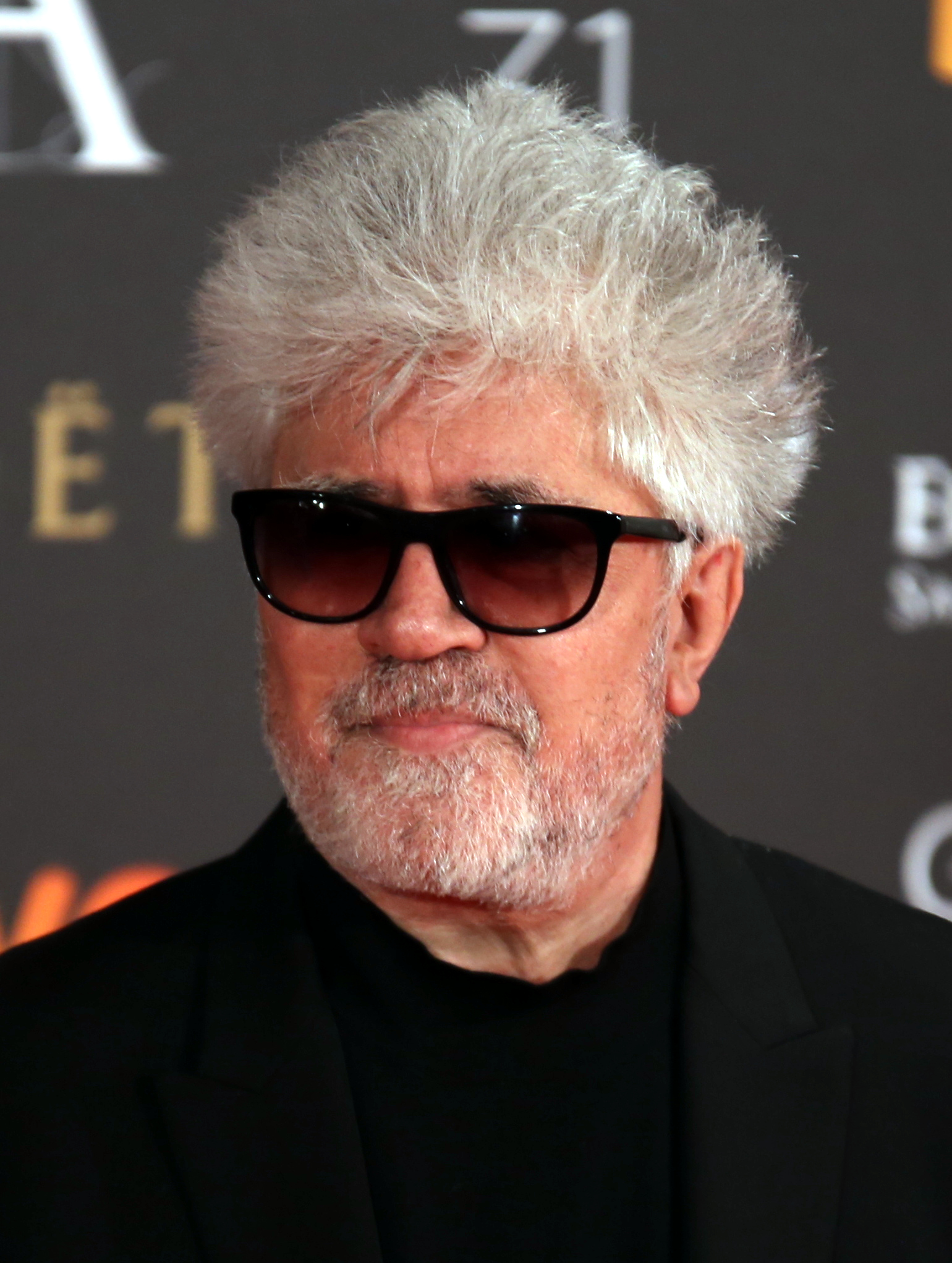
Pedro Almodóvar won in 2019.

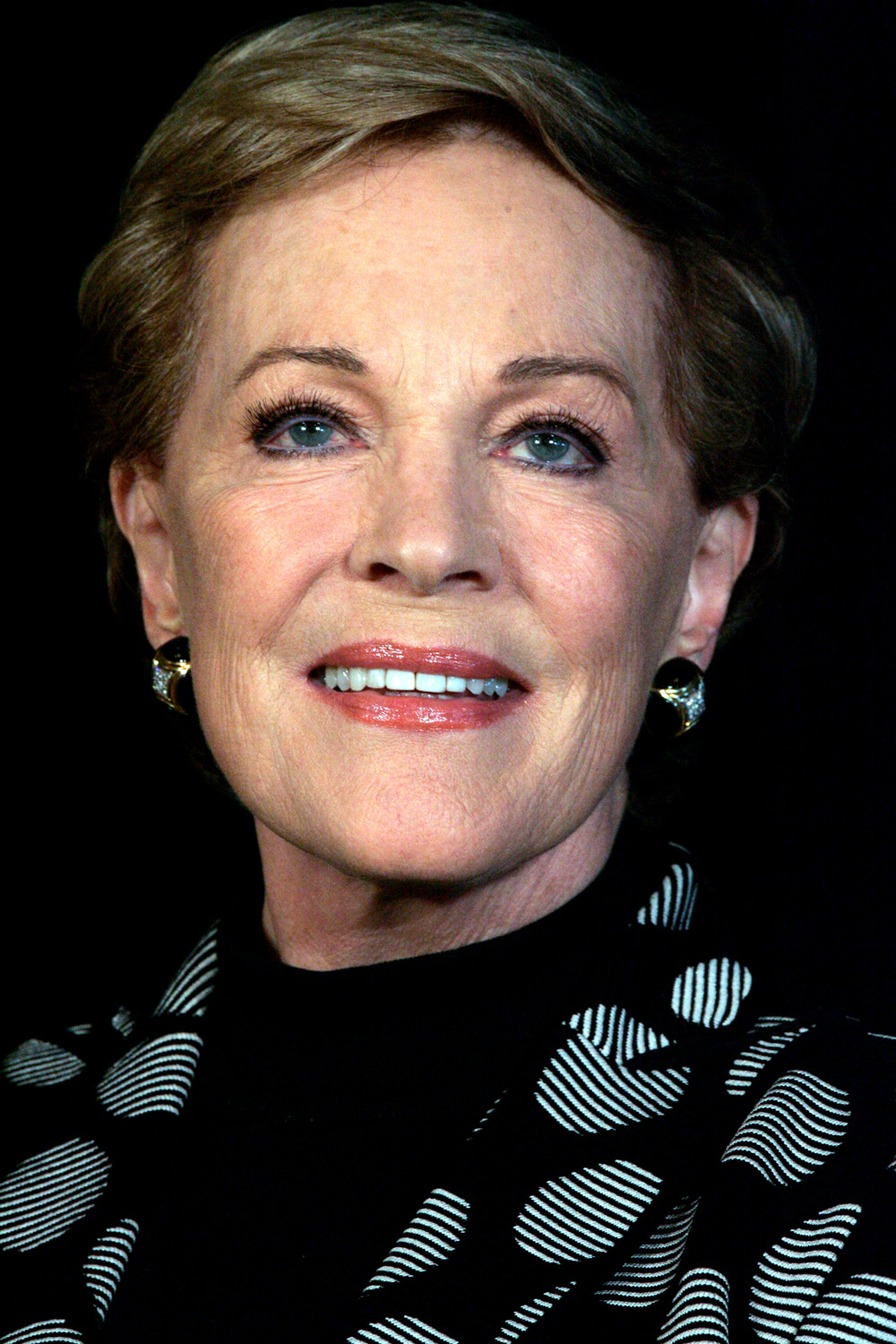
Dame Julie Andrews won in 2019.

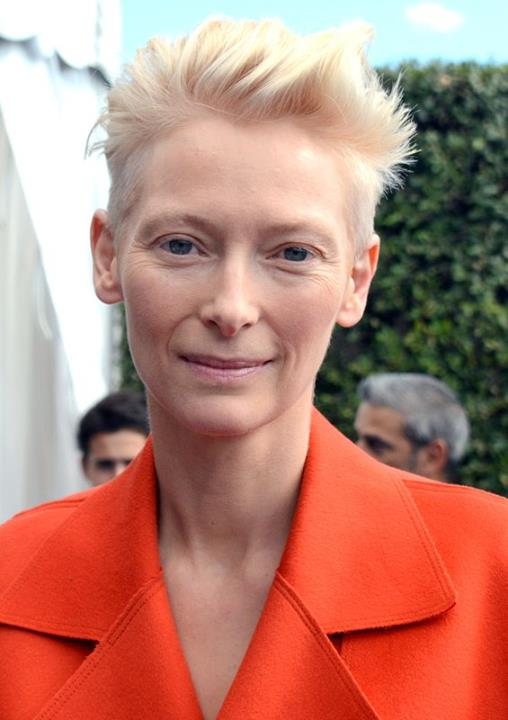
Tilda Swinton won in 2020.

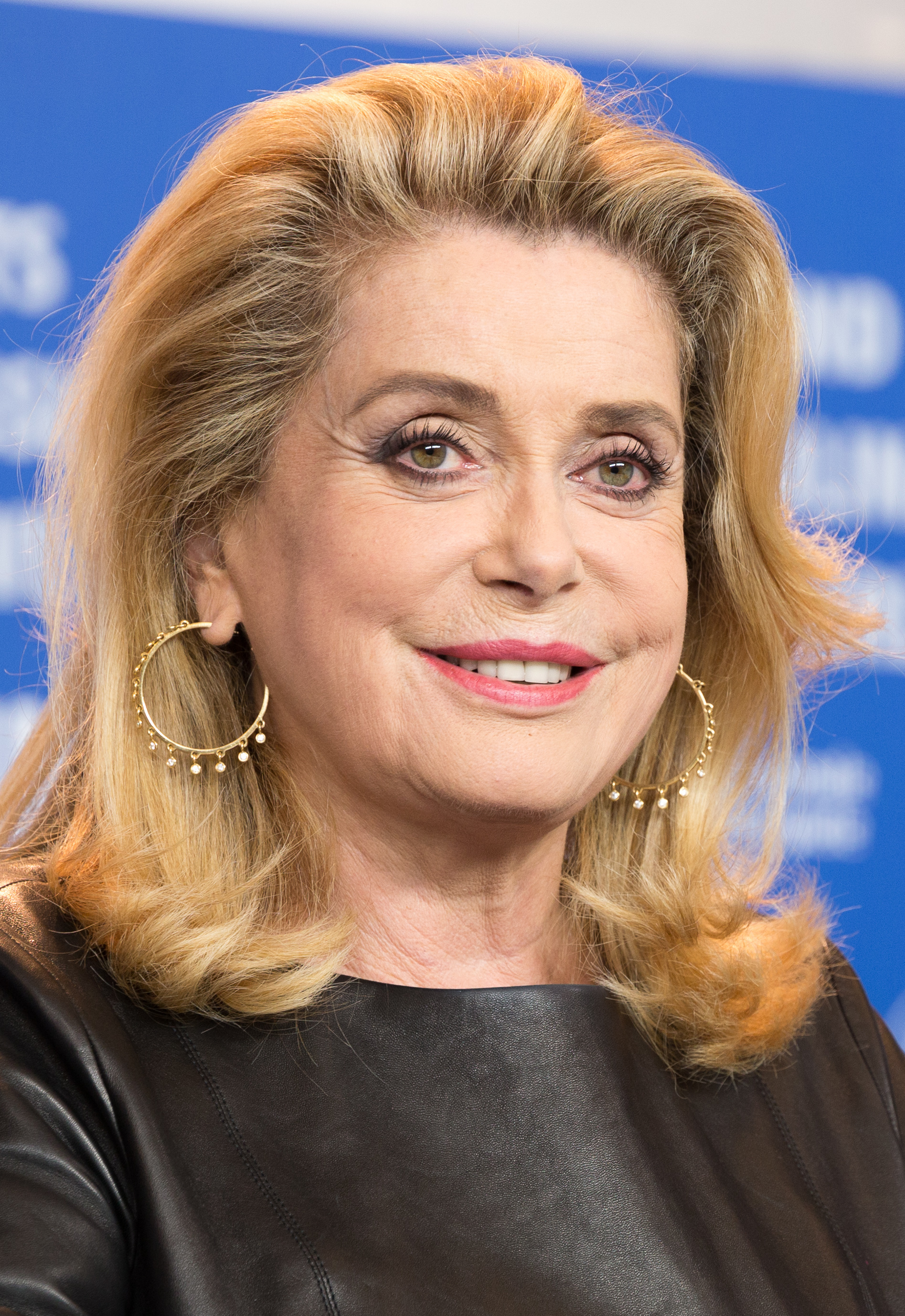
Catherine Deneuve won in 2022.

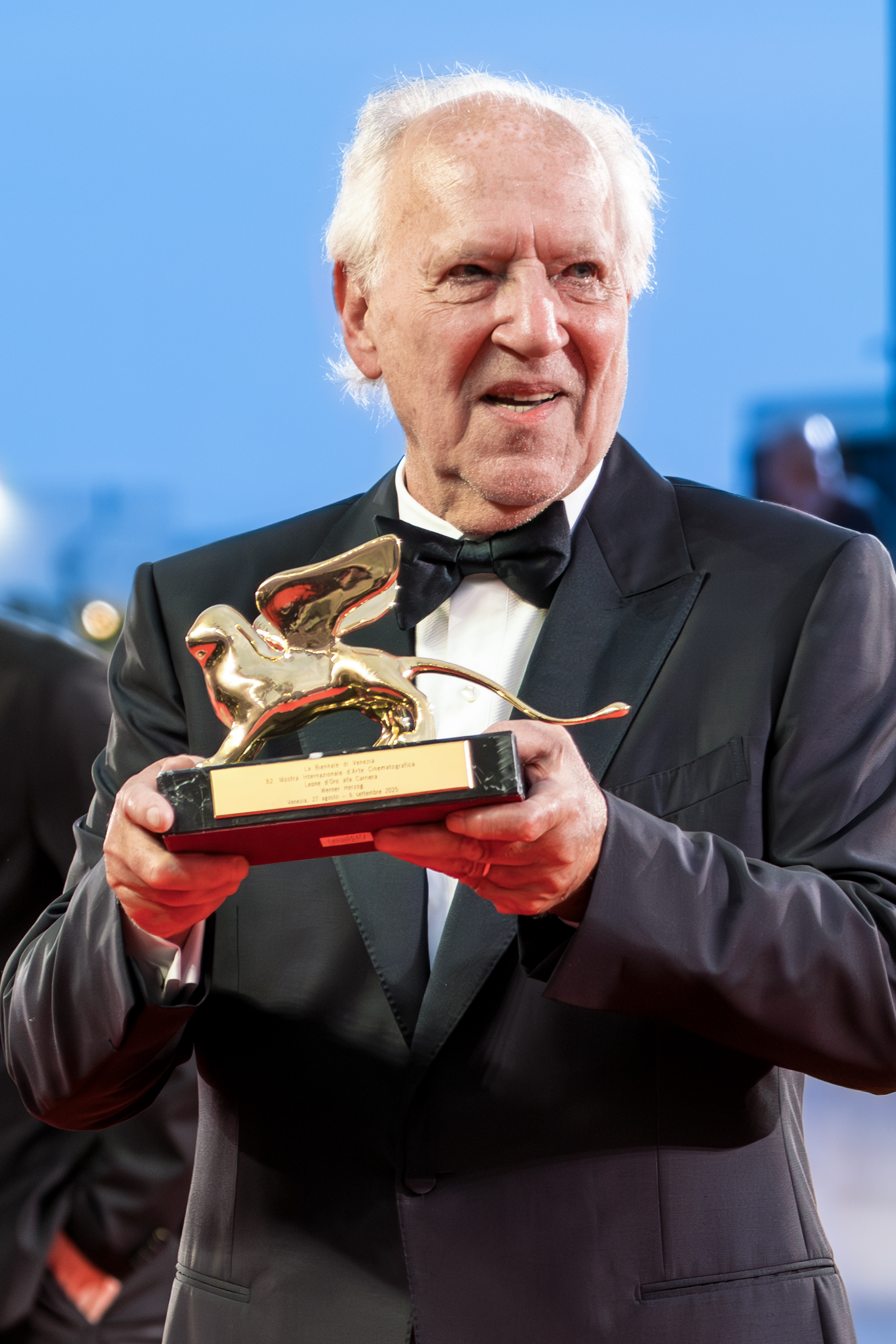
Werner Herzog won in 2025.

=== 1960s ===
Year	Recipient	Profession	Nationality
1969: Awarded as "Omaggio per il complesso dell'opera"
1969	Luis Buñuel	Filmmaker	Spain, Mexico

=== 1970s ===
Year	Recipient	Profession	Nationality
1970: Awarded as "Omaggio per il complesso dell'opera"
1970	Orson Welles	Filmmaker and actor	United States
1971–present: Awarded as "Leone d'oro alla carriera"
1971	Ingmar Bergman	Filmmaker	Sweden
1971	Marcel Carné	Filmmaker	France
1971	John Ford	Filmmaker	United States
1972	Charlie Chaplin	Filmmaker and actor	England
1972	Anatoli Golovnya	Cinematographer	Soviet Union
1972	Billy Wilder	Filmmaker	Austria, United States

=== 1980s ===
Year	Recipient	Profession	Nationality
1982	Alessandro Blasetti	Filmmaker	Italy
1982	Luis Buñuel	Filmmaker	Spain, Mexico
1982	Frank Capra	Filmmaker	Italy, United States
1982	George Cukor	Filmmaker	United States
1982	Jean-Luc Godard	Filmmaker	France, Switzerland
1982	Alexander Kluge	Filmmaker	Germany
1982	Akira Kurosawa	Filmmaker	Japan
1982	Michael Powell	Filmmaker	England
1982	Satyajit Ray	Filmmaker	India
1982	King Vidor	Filmmaker	United States
1982	Sergei Yutkevich	Filmmaker	Soviet Union
1982	Cesare Zavattini	Screenwriter	Italy
1983	Michelangelo Antonioni	Filmmaker	Italy
1985	Federico Fellini	Filmmaker	Italy
1986	Paolo and Vittorio Taviani	Filmmakers	Italy
1987	Luigi Comencini	Filmmaker	Italy
1987	Joseph L. Mankiewicz	Filmmaker	United States
1988	Joris Ivens	Filmmaker	Netherlands
1989	Robert Bresson	Filmmaker	France

=== 1990s ===
Year	Recipient	Profession	Nationality	Ref.
1990	Miklós Jancsó	Filmmaker	Hungary	
1990	Marcello Mastroianni	Actor	Italy	
1991	Mario Monicelli	Filmmaker	Italy	
1991	Gian Maria Volonté	Actor	Italy	
1992	Francis Ford Coppola	Filmmaker	United States	
1992	Jeanne Moreau	Actress and director	France	
1992	Paolo Villaggio	Actor and screenwriter	Italy	
1993	Claudia Cardinale	Actress	Italy	
1993	Robert De Niro	Actor and producer	United States	
1993	Roman Polanski	Filmmaker	France, Poland	
1993	Steven Spielberg	Filmmaker	United States	
1994	Suso Cecchi d'Amico	Screenwriter	Italy	
1994	Ken Loach	Filmmaker	England	
1994	Al Pacino	Actor	United States	
1995	Woody Allen	Filmmaker and actor	United States	
1995	Giuseppe De Santis	Filmmaker	Italy	
1995	Goffredo Lombardo	Producer	Italy	
1995	Ennio Morricone	Composer	Italy	
1995	Alain Resnais	Filmmaker	France	
1995	Martin Scorsese	Filmmaker	United States	
1995	Alberto Sordi	Actor and director	Italy	
1995	Monica Vitti	Actress	Italy	
1996	Robert Altman	Filmmaker	United States	
1996	Vittorio Gassman	Actor	Italy	
1996	Dustin Hoffman	Actor	United States	
1996	Michèle Morgan	Actress	France	
1997	Gérard Depardieu	Actor	France	
1997	Stanley Kubrick	Filmmaker	United States	
1997	Alida Valli	Actress	Italy	
1998	Warren Beatty	Actor and filmmaker	United States	
1998	Sophia Loren	Actress	Italy	
1998	Andrzej Wajda	Filmmaker	Poland	
1999	Jerry Lewis	Comedian	United States	

=== 2000s ===
Year	Recipient	Profession	Nationality	Ref.
2000	Clint Eastwood	Actor and filmmaker	United States	
2001	Éric Rohmer	Filmmaker, critic	France	
2002	Dino Risi	Filmmaker	Italy	
2003	Dino De Laurentiis	Producer	Italy, United States	
2003	Omar Sharif	Actor	Egypt	
2004	Stanley Donen	Filmmaker and choreographer	United States	
2004	Manoel de Oliveira	Filmmaker	Portugal	
2005	Hayao Miyazaki	Filmmaker	Japan	
2005	Stefania Sandrelli	Actress	Italy	
2006	David Lynch	Filmmaker	United States	
2007	Tim Burton	Filmmaker	United States	
2008	Ermanno Olmi	Filmmaker and cinematographer	Italy	
2009	John Lasseter (Note: Presented to Lasseter alongside the Disney•Pixar directors Brad Bird, Pete Docter, Andrew Stanton and Lee Unkrich.)	Filmmaker and producer	United States	

=== 2010s ===
Year	Recipient	Profession	Nationality	Ref.
2010	John Woo	Filmmaker	Hong Kong	
2011	Marco Bellocchio	Filmmaker	Italy	
2012	Francesco Rosi	Filmmaker	Italy	
2013	William Friedkin	Filmmaker	United States	
2014	Thelma Schoonmaker	Editor	United States	
2014	Frederick Wiseman	Filmmaker	United States	
2015	Bertrand Tavernier	Filmmaker and critic	France	
2016	Jean-Paul Belmondo	Actor	France	
2016	Jerzy Skolimowski	Filmmaker	Poland	
2017	Jane Fonda	Actress	United States	
2017	Robert Redford	Actor and filmmaker	United States	
2018	David Cronenberg	Filmmaker	Canada	
2018	Vanessa Redgrave	Actress	England	
2019	Pedro Almodóvar	Filmmaker	Spain	
2019	Julie Andrews	Actress	England	

=== 2020s ===
Year	Recipient	Profession	Nationality	Ref.
2020	Ann Hui	Filmmaker and actress	Hong Kong	
2020	Tilda Swinton	Actress	Scotland	
2021	Roberto Benigni	Filmmaker and actor	Italy	
2021	Jamie Lee Curtis	Actress	United States	
2022	Catherine Deneuve	Actress	France	
2022	Paul Schrader	Filmmaker	United States	
2023	Liliana Cavani	Filmmaker	Italy	
2023	Tony Leung Chiu-wai	Actor	Hong Kong	
2024	Sigourney Weaver	Actress	United States	
2024	Peter Weir	Filmmaker	Australia	
2025	Werner Herzog	Filmmaker	Germany	
2025	Kim Novak	Actress	United States	
2026	Ellen Burstyn	Actress	United States	
2026	George Clooney	Filmmaker and actor	United States	

== See also ==
- Golden Lion
- Academy Honorary Award
- Golden Globe Cecil B. DeMille Award
- Honorary César
- Honorary Golden Bear
- Honorary Goya Award
- Nastro d'Argento Lifetime Achievement Award
- Honorary Palme d'Or
