= Sierra Maestra (film) =

1969 drama film

- Directed by: Ansano Giannarelli
- Screenplay by: Ansano Giannarelli; Fernando Birri; Vittorina Bortoli
- Produced by: Marina Piperno
- Starring: Antonio Salines; Carla Gravina
- Cinematography: Marcello Gatti
- Edited by: Velia Santini
- Music by: Vittorio Gelmetti
- Release date: 1969
- Language: Italian

Sierra Maestra is a 1969 Italian political drama film co-written and directed by Ansano Giannarelli, in his feature directorial debut. It premiered at the 30th Venice International Film Festival.

== Cast ==
- Antonio Salines as Franco
- Carla Gravina as Carla
- Fabian Cevallos as Emilio
- Giacomo Piperno as Giacomo
- Fernando Birri as Manolo
- Barbara Pilavin
- Franco Graziosi
- Bruno Cirino

== Production ==
Set in Bolivia, the film was shot between Venezuela, Casale Filonardi near Rome, and the little Sardinian town of Loculi, in the Province of Nuoro.
