= The Glass Menagerie (1966 film) =

1966 CBS television film

- Genre: Drama
- Based on: The Glass Menagerie by Tennessee Williams
- Directed by: Michael Elliott
- Starring: Shirley Booth; Barbara Loden; Hal Holbrook; Pat Hingle
- Music by: Paul Bowles
- Country of origin: United States
- Original language: English

Production
- Producers: David Susskind; Jacqueline Babbin
- Running time: 104 minutes
- Production companies: Talent Associates Ltd. Rediffusion Television Ltd.

Original release
- Network: CBS
- Release: December 8, 1966

The Glass Menagerie is a 1966 American made-for-television drama film based on the 1944 play of the same name by Tennessee Williams. It is directed by Michael Elliott and stars Shirley Booth, Hal Holbrook, Barbara Loden and Pat Hingle. Sponsored by Xerox, it originally aired on December 8, 1966 as an installment of CBS Playhouse. The adaptation received two Primetime Emmy Award nominations for Outstanding Dramatic Program and Outstanding Actress (Booth).

== Cast ==
- Shirley Booth as Amanda Wingfield
- Hal Holbrook as Tom Wingfield
- Barbara Loden as Laura Wingfield
- Pat Hingle as Jim O'Connor

== Reception ==
The New York Times' Jack Gould wrote that it was "an evening of superb theater....The delicate delineation of the loneliness of the frustrated Wingfield family was brought to television with lean beauty and eloquence." He had mostly praise for Booth, describing her portrayal of Amanda Wingfield as "fluttery" and "appropriately intrusive as the perennial Mrs. Fix-it." On the downside, he added that "her belle seemed a shade mechanized and not intuitively Southern."

== Restoration ==
Since the premiere airing, the original master copy has been presumed to be lost. The Paley Center for Media's research manager Jane Klain had received numerous requests to watch this version over the years. One such request came in 1999 from Broadway Theatre Archive which wanted to release the broadcast on DVD. That began a search in which Klain contacted the estate of telecast co-producer David Susskind, CBS, the Library of Congress, Xerox, Elia Kazan who was married to Barbara Loden and various archives. The results at each turn were not successful.

The creation of a replacement master copy began in autumn of 2015 when Klain spotted an entry labeled "Glass Menagerie, U.S.C." while scanning the Susskind estate's database. She contacted the archivists at the University of Southern California's Cinematic Arts Library who found several quadruplex videotapes, one of which was damaged, containing six hours of raw takes. Klain then discovered a bootleg audio of the entire telecast on the Internet Archive. Los Angeles-based preservationist Dan Wingate restored the damaged reel and matched the audio with the corresponding takes to complete the project by early-November 2016.

This adaptation was shown twice on Turner Classic Movies (TCM) on the evening of December 8, 2016, exactly fifty years after its original broadcast. Legal permission to air the recording had been granted just eight days earlier on November 29. The Paley Center for Media got to keep a copy of the replacement master.
