= A Woman's Case =

- DVD cover
- מקרה אישה
- Directed by: Jacques Katmor
- Written by: Jacques Katmor; Amnon Salomon
- Produced by: Avraham Deshe; Mati Raz
- Starring: Helit Yeshurun; Yossi Spector; Igael Tumarkin; Ann Tochmeyer; Tirzeh Arbel; Adar Eshet; Aharon Almog; Aviva Paz; Gad Kaynar; Ika Yisraeli; Abraham Plata; Ester Zbako; Anat Zagórski; Avraham Inhaber; Nora Jantzen; Smadar Dror; Daniella Doron; Tatiana Lifshitz; Joseph Ben-Gal; Rachel Efrati; Margaret Gary; Ester Safkow; Ahuva Zimmerman; Susie Hulk; Els Salla; Urs Plang; Nitza Ernst; Raquel Shore; Yael Grinfeld; Rachel Levy; Gila Peles; Cornelia Kristal
- Cinematography: Amnon Salomon
- Edited by: Nellie Gilad
- Music by: The Churchills; Yohanan Zaray
- Production company: Lamut Le'at Ltd.
- Release date: 1969 (Israel)
- Running time: 82 Minutes
- Country: Israel
- Language: Hebrew

A Woman's Case (Hebrew: מקרה אישה, tr. Mikreh Isha) is a 1969 black and white Israeli independent underground experimental dramatic art film, the first Israeli film to be screened at the Venice Film Festival, directed by Jacques Katmor, and, usually, categorized as belonging to the bohemian/counterculture and New Sensibility movement. The film was released on DVD by NMC Music. Cinematographer and coscreenwriter Amnon Salomon stated, during an interview, held late in life, that the film's origin is in Katmor's early exhibition, dealing with the female body, and, that the filmmakers had no commercial motivations.

== Synopsis ==
This modernist and non-linear film, influenced by the French New Wave, and, especially, by films such as Jules and Jim and Breathless, tells the story of an advertiser (Yossi Spector), in his forties, who meets Helit (Helit Yeshurun), a model in her twenties, and together the two spend a day in Tel Aviv and Jerusalem. The model leads the advertiser into cafés and drug-fueled orgies, while, he leads her into the workshops of sculptors, so, that they could create sculptures, modeled on her body, out of gypsum. While she tries to liberate his mind, he attempts to stay where he is. The film ends with the advertiser strangling Helit to death, during a sadomasochistic session.

== Reception ==
Maariv compared the film to the works of James Joyce, Jean-Luc Godard, and, Michelangelo Antonioni, with the acting of Helit Yeshurun being compared to that of Monica Vitti, writer Yoram Kaniuk wrote that the film is a critique of the horrors of the modern world, and, Davar compared the film to painting. The film, however, was a commercial failure, with only 38,000 tickets sold, due to its highly avant-garde nature. University of Haifa sociologist, Prof. Dr. Oz Almog, wrote that film's main theme is the independent woman's, unsuccessful, attempt to free the man, from the shackles of his masculinity, and, noted that it was one of the first Israeli films to express their director's personal view.
