= Jacques Katmor =

Israeli experimental filmmaker, painter and multimedia artist

Jacques Mory-Katmor
- ז׳אק מורי־קתמור
- Born: 4 September 1938; Cairo, Cairo Governorate, Egypt
- Died: 6 September 2001 (aged 63); Tel Aviv Sourasky Medical Center, Tel Aviv, Tel Aviv District, Israel
- Education: École nationale supérieure des Beaux-Arts
- Occupations: Artist; Filmmaker; Painter; Soldier
- Years active: 1963–2001
- Known for: Filmmaking
- Notable work: A Woman's Case 1969
- Style: Art film
- Movement: New Sensitivity
- Spouses: Helit Yeshurun (m. 1963; div. 1969) (born in Tel Aviv, Jaffa Subdistrict, Lydda District, Mandatory Palestine on 2 April 1942) Ann Tochmeyer (m. 1969; died 2001) (born in the Russian Soviet Federative Socialist Republic, Soviet Union on 2 May 1948; died in Amsterdam, North Holland, Netherlands on 28 May 2004)
- Military career
- Allegiance: Israel
- Branch: Israel Defense Forces
- Unit: Artillery Corps
- Conflicts: Six-Day War

Jacques Mory-Katmor (Hebrew: ז׳אק מורי־קתמור; 4 September 1938 in Cairo, Egypt – 6 September 2001 in Tel Aviv, Israel was an Israeli bohemian/counterculture experimental filmmaker, painter, and multimedia artist of anarchical, underground, and, independent leanings.

== Biography ==
Jacques Mory was born into a wealthy, Jewish, family in Cairo. His father was a realtor and tile factory owner. He attended a Jesuit school. Upon turning 18, he travelled to Paris and Switzerland to study art at the École nationale supérieure des Beaux-Arts. In 1960, he immigrated to Israel. He served in the Artillery Corps, taking part in the Six-Day War.

== Art career ==
During the 1960s and 1970s, he organized a group of artists and intellectuals who called themselves "The Third Eye," a commune dedicated to the ideas of Timothy Leary. He claimed to be strongly influenced by Friedrich Nietzsche and the Marquis de Sade. At Avoth Yeshurun's suggestion, he turned his last name into a phonetic rendering of quatre mortes, French for "four deaths."

His apartment on Dizengoff Street in Tel Aviv, where his only film was shot, was a hub of city life during that time.

He married translator, model, and, editor Helit Yeshurun, daughter of poet Avoth Yeshurun, while working on his avant-garde 1969 film A Woman's Case. He met Ann Tochmeyer during that period. She was a model who appeared on the covers of magazines such as HaOlam HaZeh. She appeared in his film and he married her after his divorce from Yeshurun. The film was a commercial failure, and, hindered his ability to pursue his career as a filmmaker. Other works included creating television programs showcasing the works of artists such as Moshe Gershuni, Yosl Bergner (1971), Yaacov Agam (1973), and, Michail Grobman (1974).

Around 1974, he left Israel for Cambodia, Canada, and, Thailand, with Tochmeyer leaving for San Francisco, and, finally, later, around 1975, for Amsterdam, together with Tochmeyer, returning in 1991. Reportedly, while abroad, they both became addicted to cocaine and heroin, while, in poverty, amongst Amsterdam squatters, forcing him to work in, and, with Tochmeyer, to work as a stripper. Together with artists as Buki, they managed to survive. Buki Greenberg. At a certain stage Jacques and Ann were relocated to Israel. Officially, the cause of his death in Israel was listed as alcoholism-related.

== Legacy ==
Retrospective held in Katmor's honor at the Nahum Gutman Museum of Art in 2012

The Horse Hospital held a retrospective in his honor between 12 October and 9 November 2013.
