= Holy Land USA =

American amusement park

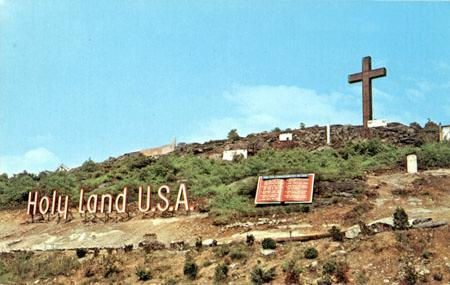
- Holy Land USA sign and cross in 1960
- Interactive map of Holy Land USA
- Location: Waterbury, Connecticut, U.S.
- Coordinates: 41.547°N 73.030°W
- Opened: 1955
- Closed: 1984, reopened 2014

Holy Land USA is an 18-acre (7.3 ha) Catholic theme park in Waterbury, Connecticut, inspired by selected passages from the Bible. It consists of a chapel, stations of the cross, and replicas of catacombs and Israelite villages constructed from cinder blocks, bathtubs, and other discarded materials.

The park closed to the public in 1984 and fell into disrepair. On September 14, 2014, the site reopened to the public for the first time in 30 years with an inaugural Mass. The area is now open to the general public during daylight hours.

== Creation and peak years ==
Holy Land USA was conceived by John Baptist Greco, a Waterbury-based attorney, with the purpose of creating an attraction that would replicate Bethlehem and Jerusalem of the Biblical Era. Construction commenced in 1955 with the help of a volunteer organization called Companions of Christ. Bob Chinn, the grounds chairman at Holy Land USA, recalled Greco's mission in a 2001 interview with The New York Times: "He was a very spiritual man. He wanted to do this for the people of the community. He felt no one, no matter the race, creed or color, should be separated. He wanted a place for all people to sit and be peaceful."

Among the original attractions at the site were a recreation of the Garden of Eden, a diorama depicting Daniel in the lions' den, and various recreations of the life and ministry of Jesus. The centerpiece of the site was a 56-foot (17 m) cross and an illuminated sign that read "Holy Land USA".

During its peak years in the 1960s and 1970s, Holy Land USA attracted upwards of 40,000 visitors annually. Greco closed Holy Land USA in 1984 with plans to improve and expand the site, but the work was left unfinished when Greco died in 1986. The property was left to the Religious Teachers Filippini.

== Closure and notable events ==
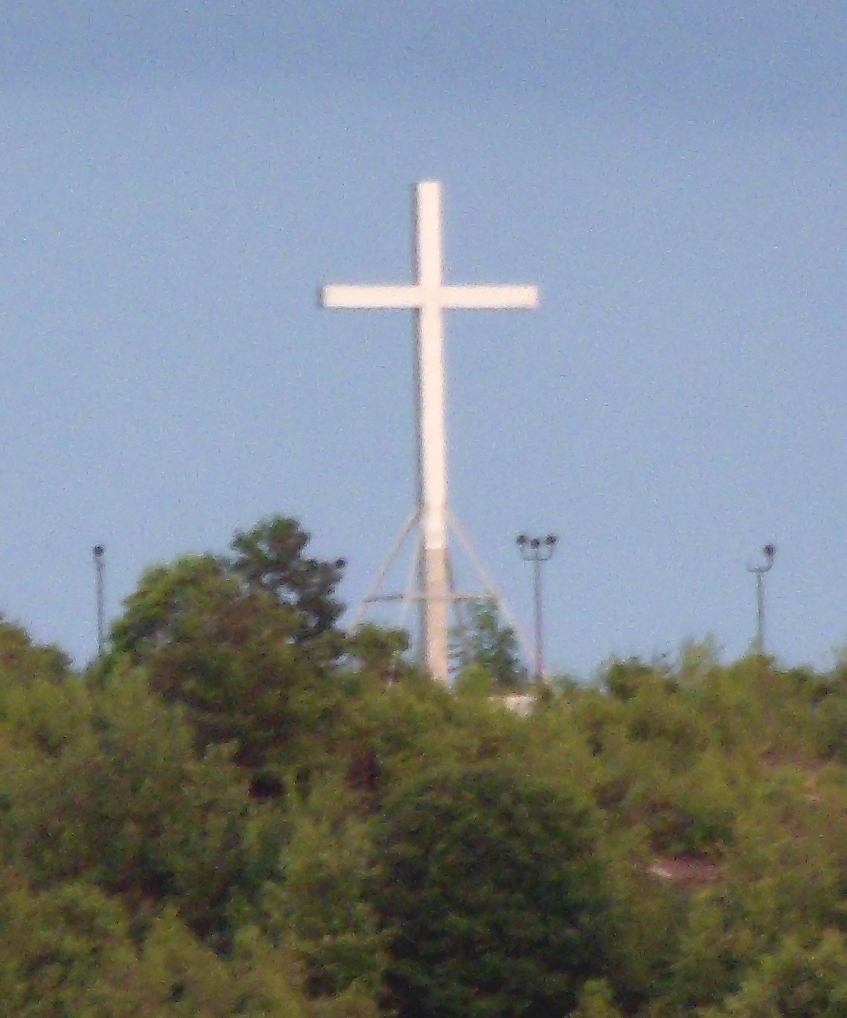
The stainless steel cross erected in 2008. The floodlights that illuminate the cross at night are visible. The Stainless Steel cross was removed in 2013 to make way for a new and larger lighted cross.

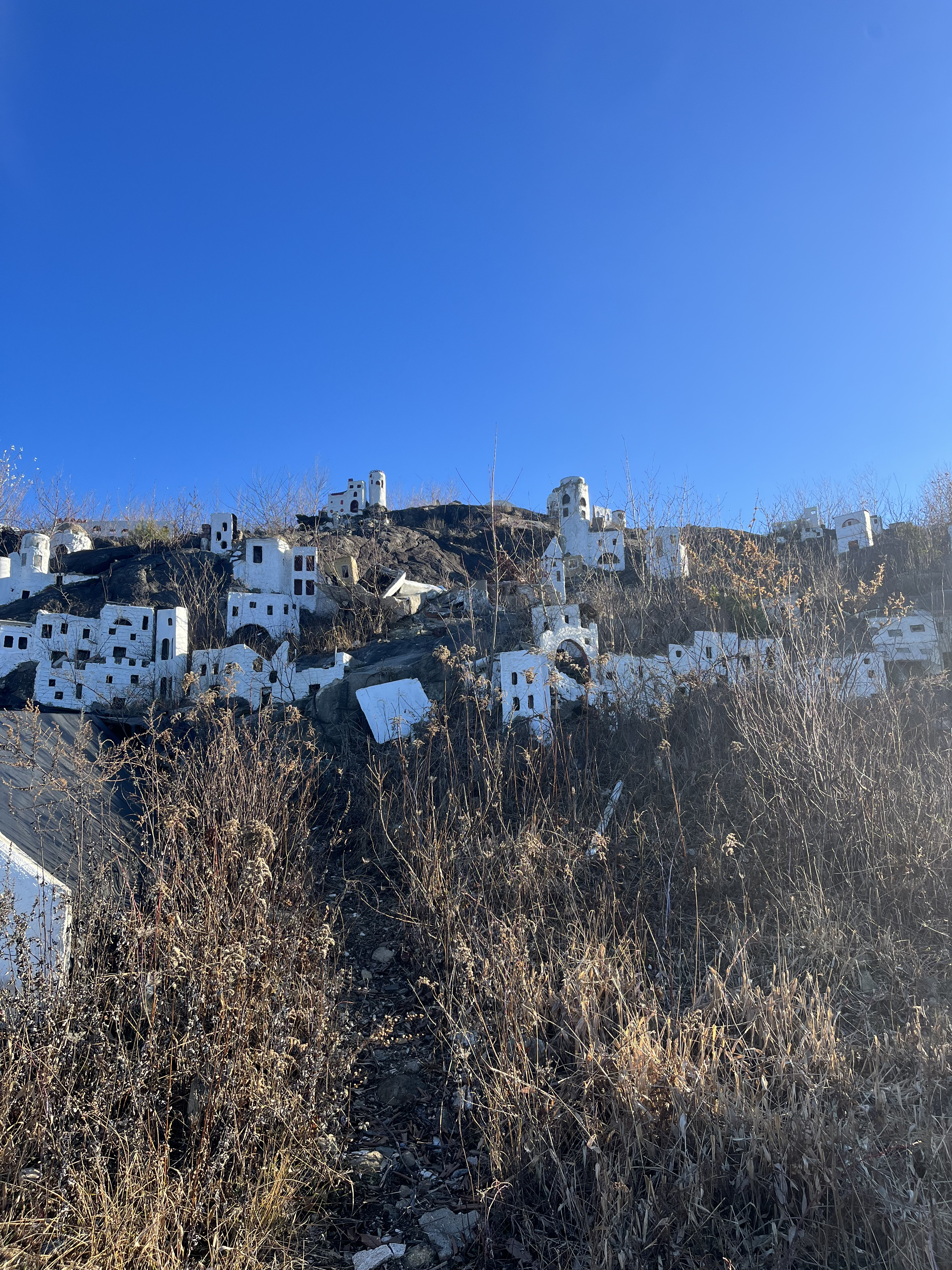
View of miniature Jerusalem and/or Bethlehem, Holy Land, USA

After its closure, Holy Land USA fell into a state of advanced disrepair, and many attractions and statues were vandalized. Although it was not open to the public, the site continued to attract attention. In 2002, the Waterbury Region Convention and Visitors Bureau received more than 150 calls asking for directions to the site. The website Roadside America included the park in coverage of offbeat attractions, albeit with the cautionary note that visitors should "explore with caution (and with an up-to-date tetanus shot)."

There was ongoing debate about the site's future. It was suggested that the park be preserved as folk art, and there were numerous failed attempts to restore the park, including one involving the Knights of Columbus in 2000. The Religious Sisters of Filippi Greco were accused of fearing "liability and being sued" and thereby turning away volunteers and stopping restoration efforts, but they also received support from those who believed that, although accepting the park reluctantly, they had been "good stewards" over it. The Sisters held weekly prayer meetings at the site, and the holy hours on Sundays were devoted to the Virgin of Revelation, an apparition of the Virgin Mary witnessed in 1947 by an Italian on his way to assassinate Pope Pius XII in Rome. The Sisters claimed that the statue of the Madonna in the chapel is one of three commissioned by Pope John Paul II.

Despite the lack of full restoration, some renovation projects were undertaken while the park was closed. In 1997 a group of Boy Scouts repaired the illuminated "Holy Land USA" sign as part of a community service project, and in 2008 the original 56-foot cross was replaced with a 50-foot (15 m) stainless steel one, which was dedicated in a ceremony led by Archbishop Henry J. Mansell.

=== Murder of Chloe Ottman ===
In July 2010, 19-year-old Francisco Cruz Jr. raped and murdered 16-year-old Chloe Ottman at the foot of the cross. Cruz proceeded to choke Ottman as he raped her. Out of fear of her screaming and alerting nearby citizens, he then fatally stabbed her multiple times in the neck. Her body was dragged into the woods where police discovered it following Cruz's confession. The rape and murder received widespread media coverage and generated interest in the park and its future use. Reports indicated that trespassing had reduced in the years before the murder.

== Revival ==
On June 20, 2013, Mayor Neil O'Leary and car dealer Fred "Fritz" Blasius purchased Holy Land from the Filippini Sisters for $350,000, announcing a plan to clean up and revitalize the site as part of a community effort. The plan included the installation of a new and larger lighted cross on the property.

In response to community outcry a new LED illuminated cross was installed in 2013. The new cross, funded by community donations and with work donated by local construction companies, is a steel structure that stands 65 feet (20 m) high and 26 feet (7.9 m) wide. The state of the art LED lighting system allows the cross to change color based on the Roman Catholic Liturgical colors.

On December 22, 2013, the new cross was illuminated. Since the revival of the cross, the once-overgrown land has been cleared of trees and underbrush. Smaller projects have been put in place to refurbish small areas of the property.

On September 14, 2014, the site reopened to the public for the first time in 30 years with an inaugural Mass. The area is now open to the general public during daylight hours.

On 11 August 2016, Archbishop Leonard Paul Blair of the Archdiocese of Hartford celebrated a Mass at the park honoring the legacy of Father Michael McGivney, who is under Vatican consideration for sainthood. McGivney was the founder of the Knights of Columbus and a native of Waterbury.

== See also ==
- Holy Land Experience, a defunct religious theme park in Florida
- Heritage USA, a defunct religious theme park
