= Edoardo Bruno =

Italian film critic and historian (1928–2020)

- Born: 11 September 1928; Rome, Italy
- Died: 16 September 2020 (aged 92); Rome, Italy
- Occupation: Film critic

Edoardo Bruno (11 September 1928 – 16 September 2020) was an Italian film critic and film historian.

== Life and career ==
Born in Rome, Bruno graduated in law at Sapienza University of Rome. He made his debut as a journalist and film critic in 1948, and collaborated with various magazines and newspapers, notably L'Avanti!, Schermi, Film.

In 1950, he founded the film critic journal Filmcritica, which he directed for 70 years and 700 issues. He collaborated with the Venice Film Festival, curing several retrospectives. In 1969, he directed his first and only film, His Day of Glory. He served as professor of history of theatre and entertainment at the Universities of Palermo and Salerno, professor of film history and criticism at his alma mater and professor of film history at the University of Florence. He died on 16 September 2020, at the age of 92.
