= Barbara Loden =

American actress and film and stage director (1932–1980)

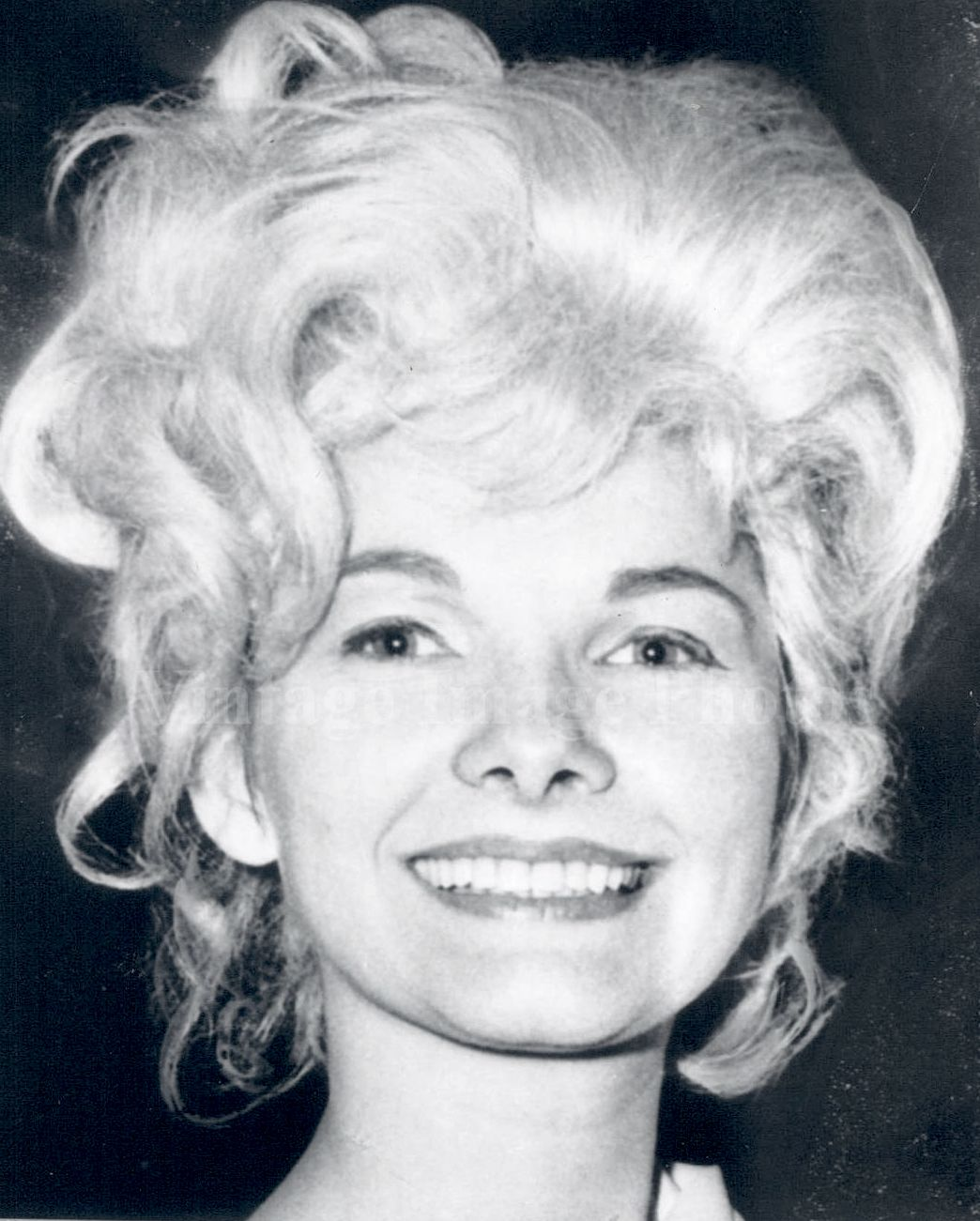
- Loden in 1964
- Born: Barbara Ann Loden; July 8, 1932; Asheville, North Carolina, U.S.
- Died: September 5, 1980 (aged 48); New York City, U.S.
- Occupations: Model; Actress; director
- Years active: 1957–1980
- Spouses: Laurence Joachim (m. 1954; divorced); Elia Kazan (m. 1967)
- Children: 2

Barbara Ann Loden (July 8, 1932 – September 5, 1980) was an American actress and director of film and theater. Richard Brody of The New Yorker described Loden as the "female counterpart to John Cassavetes".

Born and raised in North Carolina, Loden began her career at an early age in New York City as a commercial model and chorus-line dancer. She moved to New York after high school, using money she had received from being in a car accident to buy her railroad ticket. Loden earned a living through cheesecake modeling and posing for romance and detective magazines for a handful of years. Loden became a regular sidekick on the irreverent Ernie Kovacs Television Show in the mid-1950s and was a lifetime member of the Actors Studio. She appeared in several projects directed by her second husband, Elia Kazan, including Splendor in the Grass (1961). Her subsequent performance in the 1964 Broadway premiere of After the Fall earned her a Tony Award for Best Featured Actress.

In 1970, Loden wrote, directed, and starred in Wanda, an independent film that won the International Critics Award at the 1970 Venice Film Festival. Throughout the 1970s, she continued to work directing off-Broadway and regional theater productions and directed two short films. In 1978, Loden was diagnosed with breast cancer, from which she died two years later, aged 48.

== Life and career ==
=== 1932–1954: Childhood and early years ===
Loden was born on July 8, 1932, (Note: Most bibliographic sources state Loden's birth year as 1932. Her Associated Press obituary as well as a New York Times retrospective also state that she was 48 at the time of her death, supporting 1932 as her birth year, despite a 1964 article which notes that "she's 30 now," indicating her birth year as 1934.) in Asheville, North Carolina. Her father was a barber, and she described herself as a "hill-billy's daughter" from a "broken home". Upon her parents' divorce in her early childhood, Loden was raised by her religious maternal grandparents in the Appalachian Mountains in rural Marion, North Carolina. Her mother worked in a different town, her father moved away, and her brother was sent to school elsewhere, leaving Loden alone. She described her childhood as emotionally impoverished. Loden had no childhood friends and said, "I spent most of my childhood hiding behind the stove". She was described as a shy, humble, statuesque, and soft-spoken loner. She attended high school in Asheville and did not fit in with her peers, saying people saw her as cheap because of the makeup and tight clothing she wore in an attempt to emulate the women she saw in films. At 16, she moved to New York City, where she began working as a model for detective and romance magazines. Loden found minor success as a pin-up girl, model, and dancer at the Copacabana nightclub before studying at the Actors Studio, intending to become an actress. But because of her accent, Loden did not believe she would find success in acting. At the time, she professed to hate film, saying, "People on the screen were perfect and they made me feel inferior."

=== 1955–1959: Early theater and television work ===
Loden made her New York theater debut in 1957 in Compulsion and also appeared on stage in The Highest Tree with Robert Redford, as well as Night Circus with Ben Gazzara. She joined the cast of The Ernie Kovacs Show as a "scantily clad" sidekick to Kovacs, a job that her first husband, television producer and film distributor Larry Joachim, helped her obtain. Loden's job on the show was to walk around in bathing suits, and she said she believed this earned her the nickname "Dumb Barbara". She said she owed a lot to Kovacs, as another producer on the show had initially vetoed his decision to hire her. In interviews, Loden said, "Ernie felt sorry for me" and gave her another job as a stunt sidekick, rolling around in a rug or getting hit in the face with a pie.

=== 1960–1966: Film, marriage to Elia Kazan ===
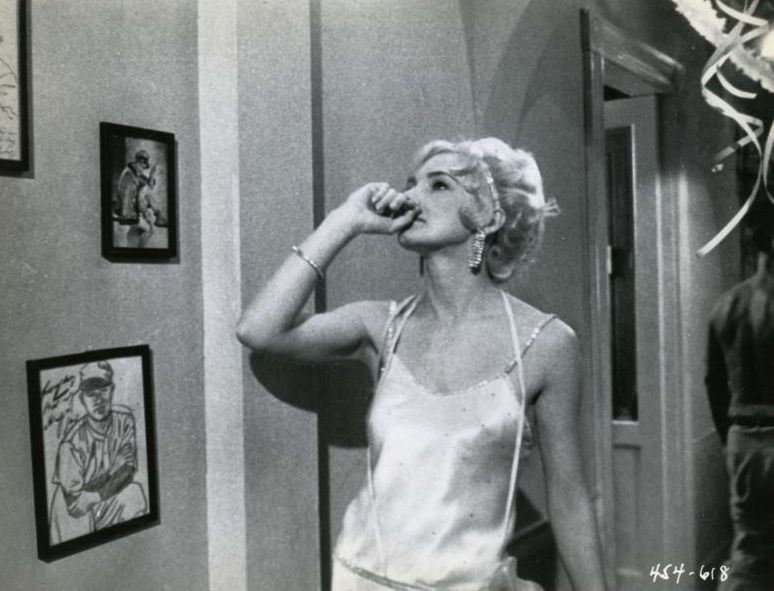
Loden in Splendor in the Grass (1961)

In 1960, Loden appeared in Elia Kazan's film Wild River as Montgomery Clift's secretary. Loden said she believed she got the part because of the relative closeness of Wild River's setting, Tennessee, to where she grew up. Wild River evidently helped her land her role in Splendor in the Grass (1961), in which she played Warren Beatty's sister.

She famously portrayed Maggie, a fictionalized version of Marilyn Monroe, in Kazan's Lincoln Center Repertory Company stage production of After the Fall (1964), which was written by Monroe's former husband, playwright Arthur Miller. Loden received a Tony award for best actress for her performance in After the Fall, as well as an annual award of the Outer Circle, an organization of writers who covered Broadway for national magazines. After the Fall reviews called Loden the "new Jean Harlow" and a "blonde bombshell". Loden recalled in 1980 that she was drawn to the part because the script reflected her own life experiences. Reviews raved about her performance in After the Fall. One said, "It is sometimes hard to tell where Barbara Loden begins and Marilyn Monroe leaves off"—not because of their physical likeness, but "in their approach to life, in their philosophy, in their desire to move up life's social and intellectual ladder". Loden never met Monroe, but said that was why her performance worked the way it did. Interviewers said that Loden's personal insecurities and rough married life resembled Monroe's, but Loden denied this. Loden argued that her performance derived instead from her five years of acting classes, though when she was taking acting classes, she did not have the nerve to fully pursue it.

Loden married her first husband, film and television producer and film distributor Larry Joachim, in the 1950s, and they had a son, Marco. Loden said she always wanted children, but never wanted to marry and "disapproved of marriage" due to her childhood. After an affair while they were both married to other people, Loden married film director Elia Kazan, who was 23 years her senior, in 1966. She had another son, Leo, with Kazan, and though estranged and considering divorce, they were still married at the time of her death from breast cancer at the age of 48.

Kazan could be contemptuous when describing his relationship with Loden. In his autobiography, Elia Kazan: A Life, he revealed his desire and inability to control her. Kazan wrote about Loden "with a mix of affection and patronization, emphasizing her sexuality and her backcountry feistiness." In a "condescending" way, Kazan bemoaned that Loden had depended on her "sexual appeal" to get ahead and that he was afraid of "losing her", but Kazan was also, in his words, "protective" of Loden. In turn, Loden felt inferior to Kazan.

Her acting career on film had a troubled history. Her first major film role was to be in the Frank Perry-directed The Swimmer starring Burt Lancaster, but during post-production, a dispute arose about the scene between producer Sam Spiegel and the film's writer-director team, the Perrys. According to notes by screenwriter Eleanor Perry, Spiegel began showing the troubled rough cut of the film around Hollywood, polling several of his famous film director friends about what he should do with it. Kazan was a major film director, who had great influence. He had also secretly been shown a private screening of the film by his friend and producer Spiegel (producer of Kazan's On the Waterfront) and had reportedly interfered with the final cut. Perry was ultimately fired from the film. Several of the film's scenes were recast and reshot by Sydney Pollack, who was hired to replace Perry, with Lancaster reportedly paying for some of the reshoots himself. Among the scenes that were entirely recast and reshot was the notorious Loden scene, with Broadway stage actress Janice Rule replacing Loden. Neither Loden nor Pollack was credited on the film. All that remains of the lost scene are still photos taken on set, which appear in Chris Innis's 2014 documentary The Story of The Swimmer.

=== 1967–1980: Film and theater directing ===
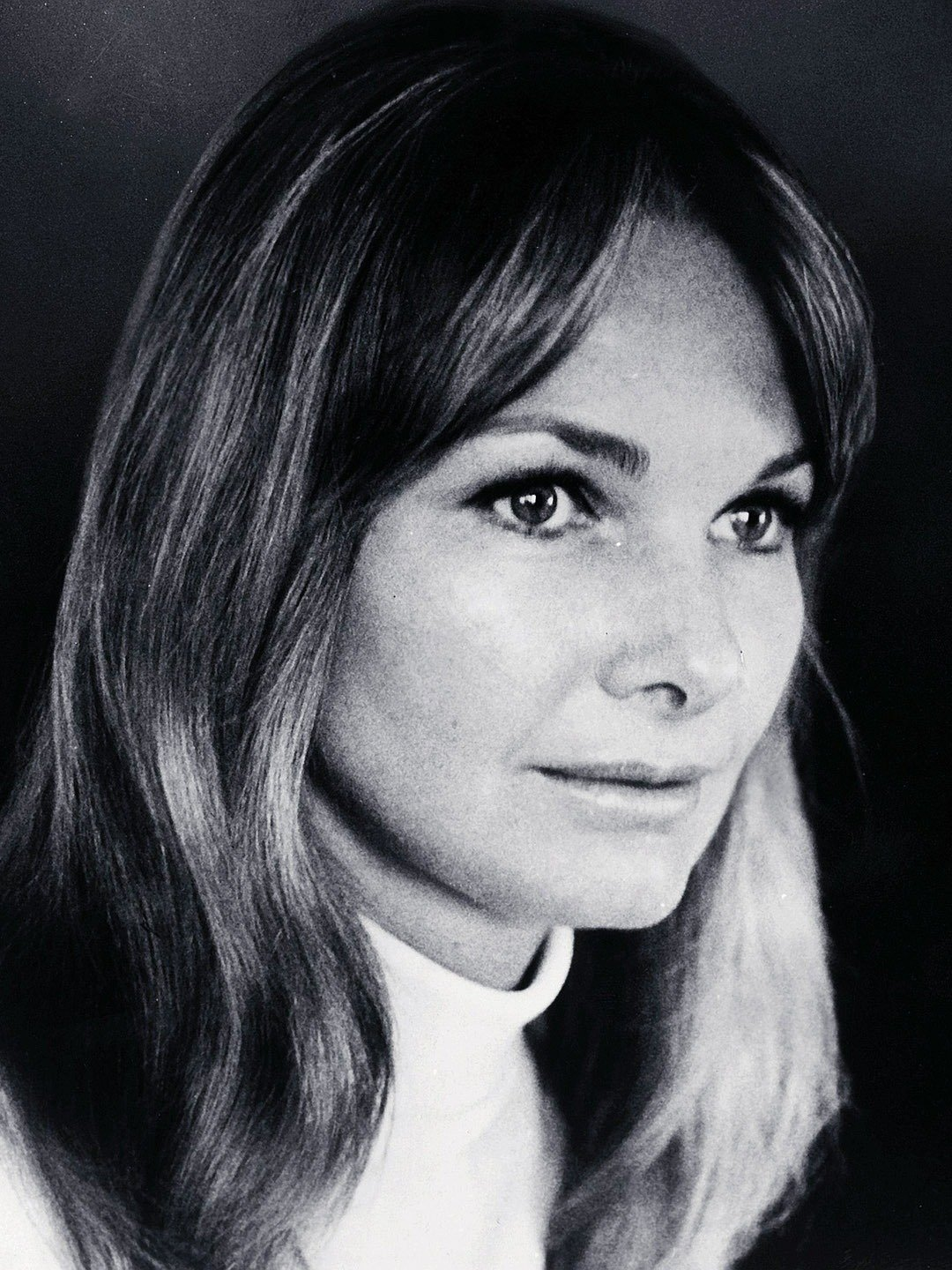
Loden in 1975

At some point during her acting career, Loden came across a newspaper article about a woman who, when on trial for accomplice to bank robbery, thanked the judge for her own sentencing. Intrigued by this story, she eventually wrote the screenplay for Wanda, a rumination on a poverty-stricken woman adrift in Pennsylvania coal country who becomes embroiled in a similar plot. The film asks, "what pain, what hopelessness could make a person desire to be put away? How could imprisonment be relief?" After sending the script to a number of potential directors, Loden felt that they "didn't seem to understand what this woman was about." She said that at first she was too afraid to say she was directing the film because of the reaction people had to women directing films. Despite the film's meager budget, Loden still struggled to raise money for Wanda. While looking for funding, she said, "when I went around and took people my script, I'd never hear from them again". But her friend Harry Schuster offered Loden financing for the film, so she directed it in collaboration with cinematographer and editor Nicholas T. Proferes on a meager $115,000 budget. Reviews at the time noted how unusual it was for a woman to direct, and Loden was quoted saying, "I really don't like to think of myself as a director, though; I'd rather think of myself as a filmmaker". Wanda was made as a nonunion film to keep costs down and Loden's vision intact. She worked with only one cameraman, one sound person, and one assistant on the film.

Wanda is a semiautobiographical portrait of a "passive, disconnected coal miner's wife who attaches herself to a petty crook." Innovative in its cinéma vérité and improvisational style, it was one of the few American films directed by a woman to be theatrically released at that time. Film critic David Thomson wrote, "Wanda is full of unexpected moments and raw atmosphere, never settling for cliché in situation or character." The film was the only American film accepted by the Venice Film Festival in 1970, where it won the International Critics' Prize, and the only American film presented at the 1971 Cannes Film Festival. In 2010, with support from Gucci, the film was restored by the UCLA Film and Television Archive and screened at the Museum of Modern Art in Manhattan.

Although Wanda never received proper distribution, screening briefly in New York and at universities, but never nationally on the theater circuit, it was noted for its groundbreaking anti-Hollywood view of a woman adrift in the American underworld. Loden said of her title character, "She's trying to get out of this very ugly type of existence, but she doesn't have the equipment"—an independent-minded idea for a cinematic heroine at the time, making Wanda an antiheroine. In 2017, Wanda was selected for preservation in the United States National Film Registry by the Library of Congress for being "culturally, historically, or aesthetically significant".

While Loden never made another feature film, she directed two educational short films for the Learning Corporation of America. The first one, The Frontier Experience, was released in 1975. It depicts a widowed pioneer woman, played by Loden, in Kansas attempting to survive the harsh winter with her children. Described as a "political prequel" to Wanda, the short explores similar themes. The second, The Boy Who Liked Deer, was released in 1978. It is a cautionary tale about vandalism, in which two boys accidentally poison a deer.

Four months before her death, Loden was interviewed in Katja Raganelli's 1980 documentary I Am Wanda. The film documents Loden's final months, when she taught acting classes.

== Death ==
In 1978, Loden was diagnosed with breast cancer. At the time, she had completed several other screenplays with Proferes that Kazan described as "devoted to the neglected side of American life." Kazan and she were estranged at the time of her cancer diagnosis and planning to divorce, but her illness precluded their separation. In June 1980, Loden was working with her acting teacher Paul Mann on a one-act play to be shown on off-off-Broadway. She had planned to work as director, producer, and leading actress, but lost the energy to complete the project. In a retrospective, she said, "my life was hard too much of the time", but also that she had made her peace with life.

At the time of her diagnosis, Loden was prepared to direct a feature about Kate Chopin's The Awakening, but her cancer treatments prevented her from starting it. She died at Mount Sinai Hospital in New York City from the disease on September 5, 1980.

== Style and themes ==
Wanda has a cinéma vérité style. Loden rejected Hollywood style, wanting to only present the world "as it actually is". She worked mainly with amateur actors, which resulted in the film's original script being loosely referenced. Loden believed that using amateurs helped the film stay uninhibited, and that using well-known actors would "get in the way of the story". The film was made with a skeleton crew of only four people. These two factors led to the film's improvisational style. The film's visuals were inspired by several Andy Warhol films. Loden said she valued content over technical aspects in film, arguing that "slick" films were not all they were built up to be. She said that more films should be shot in documentary-like styles to show "that was shot under real circumstances". According to Loden, everyone has the potential to make a film, and "everybody who wants to make a film should do it, instead of just being fed the stuff on television and movies. Just think, people could say, 'I made a film the other day. Why don't you come over and look at it?"

Loden's work as an actress and filmmaker drew inspiration from her own life. She said that the character Maggie, whom Loden won a Tony for portraying, was like her in that she was "not educated" and "had a very strong need to be accepted". Kazan said of Loden's work, "she's always dramatizing her own feelings about something." Like Maggie in After The Fall, Wanda and Delilah Fowler are also uneducated women.

The major theme of Wanda and The Frontier Experience is women's lack of agency. Both films feature mothers in difficult situations. An unmade play by Loden planned to explore these themes further, but was never finished due to her death.

Wanda has been described as a feminist work, but Loden did not intend it to be. It is notable for its portrayal of an unsympathetic woman, which garnered some criticism, notably from Pauline Kael, who called the character "dumb".

== Legacy ==
French writer and experimental filmmaker Marguerite Duras cited Wanda as an inspiration, particularly Loden's ability to inhabit her character onscreen, saying in an interview with Kazan, "I think that there is a miracle in Wanda. Usually there is a distance between the visual representation and the text, as well as the subject and the action. Here this distance is completely nullified; there is an instant and permanent continuity between Barbara Loden and Wanda." Duras described Loden's performance of Wanda's "demoralization" as "sacred, powerful, violent and profound."

Kazan compared Loden's acting technique to Marlon Brando: "There was always an element of improvisation, a surprise, in what she was doing. The only one, as far as I know, who was like that is Brando when he was young. He never knew exactly what he was going to say, therefore everything would come out of his mouth very alive."

Wanda never aspired to be a romanticized crime-spree vision, such as Arthur Penn's Bonnie and Clyde. Loden purposefully favored a gritty documentary approach:

I really hate slick pictures... They're too perfect to be believable. I don't mean just in the look. I mean in the rhythm, in the cutting, the music—everything. The slicker the technique is the slicker the content becomes, until everything turns into Formica, including the people.

With its hand-held camera, anonymous locations, available lighting on 16 mm (blown up to 35 mm), and improvisation by a mostly amateur cast, critic Richard Brody considers Wanda to be not so much in the tone of the concurrent French New Wave, but more like the improvisational directorial work of John Cassavetes.

Although Loden was one of the very few women directors of the late '60s/early '70s, she did not consider Wanda a feminist film at the time she was working on it, saying:

When I made Wanda, I didn't know anything about consciousness raising or women's liberation. That had just started when the film was finished. The picture was not about women's liberation. It was really about the oppression of women, of people... Being a woman is unexplored territory, and we're pioneers of a sort, discovering what it means to be a woman.

In 2012, Supplément à la vie de Barbara Loden by acclaimed French author Nathalie Léger was published. The book, taking Wanda and Loden's biography as its inspiration, combines fact and fiction to examine the nature of lived truth. It was translated into English by Natasha Lehrer and published as Suite for Barbara Loden in 2016. In 2021, Anna Backman Rogers's book Still Life: Notes on Barbara Loden's "Wanda" (1970) was published. It analyzes the themes of Wanda and discusses its lasting importance.

== Filmography ==
=== Film ===
| Year | Title | Role | Notes | Ref. |
|---|---|---|---|---|
| 1960 | Wild River | Betty Jackson | | |
| 1961 | Splendor in the Grass | Ginny Stamper | | |
| 1968 | The Swimmer | Shirley Abbott | (scenes reshot with Janice Rule) | |
| 1968 | Fade In | Jean | TV movie | |
| 1970 | Wanda | Wanda Goronski | Also writer and director | |
| 1975 | The Frontier Experience | Delilah Fowler | Short; also director and producer (final film role) | |
| 1975 | The Boy Who Liked Deer | | Short; director and producer | |

=== Television ===
| Year | Title | Role | Notes | Ref. |
|---|---|---|---|---|
| 1955–1957 | The Ernie Kovacs Show | | Series regular | |
| 1962 | Alcoa Premiere | Betty Johnson | Episode: "The Boy Who Wasn't Wanted" | |
| 1962 | Naked City | Penny Sonners | Episode: "Torment Him Much and Hold Him Long" | |
| 1966 | CBS Playhouse: The Glass Menagerie | Laura Wingfield | | |

=== Documentary appearances ===
| Year | Title | Notes | Ref. |
|---|---|---|---|
| 1980 | I Am Wanda | Documentary subject | |

== Stage credits ==
| Year | Title | Role | Notes | Ref. |
|---|---|---|---|---|
| 1957 | Compulsion | Bit part | Broadway | |
| 1958 | Night Circus | | Co-starring with Ben Gazzara | |
| 1959 | Look After Lulu! | Gaby | Broadway; directed by Noël Coward | |
| 1959 | The Highest Tree | | Broadway; co-starring Robert Redford | |
| 1960 | The Long Dream | White Girl | Broadway | |
| 1964–1965 | After the Fall | Maggie | Broadway; Tony Award for Best Featured Actress | |
| 1964 | But for Whom Charlie | Sheila Maloney | Broadway | |
| 1964 | The Changeling | Beatrice | Broadway | |
| 1968 | Winter Journey | | Broadway | |
| 1968 | The Country Girl | | Broadway | |
| 1969 | Home is the Hero | —N/a | Off-Broadway; director | |
| 1975 | The Love Death Plays of William Inge | —N/a | Off-Broadway; director | |
| 1976 | Berchtesgaden | —N/a | Off-off Broadway; director | |
| 1980 | Come Back to the Five and Dime, Jimmy Dean, Jimmy Dean | Mona | Off-Broadway | |

== Awards and nominations ==
- Tony Award – Best Featured Actress, 1964 (for After the Fall)
- International Critics Award — Venice Film Festival, 1970 (for Wanda)

== Works cited ==
- Acker, Ally (1991). Reel Women - Pioneers of the Cinema, 1896 to the Present. New York: The Continuum Publishing Company. ISBN 978-0-826-40499-2.
- Commire, Anne; Klezmer, Deborah (1999). Women in World History: A Biographical Encyclopedia. Vol. 9. Waterford, Connecticut: Yorkin. ISBN 978-0-787-64068-2.
- Garfield, David (1980). A Player's Place: The Story of the Actors Studio. New York: Macmillan. ISBN 978-0-025-42650-4.
- Guernsey, Otis L.; et al. (1968). The Best Plays of 1967–1968. Burns Mantle Yearbook. Vol. 49. New York: Dodd, Mead. OCLC 990510372.
- Hischak, Thomas (2012). Broadway Plays and Musicals: Descriptions and Essential Facts of More Than 14,000 Shows through 2007. Jefferson, North Carolina: McFarland. ISBN 978-0-786-45309-2.
- Jewell, James C.; Howard, Thomas E. (1977). Broadway and the Tony Awards: The First Three Decades, 1947-1977. Washington, D.C.: University Press of America. ISBN 978-0-819-10339-0.
- Kazan, Elia (1988). Elia Kazan: A Life. New York: Alfred A. Knopf. ISBN 978-0-394-55953-7.
- Kazan, Elia (2015). Devlin, Albert J.; Devlin, Marlene J. (eds.). The Selected Letters of Elia Kazan. New York: Knopf Doubleday Publishing Group. ISBN 978-1-101-91139-6.
- Leeson, Richard M. (1994). William Inge: A Research and Production Sourcebook. Westport, Connecticut: Greenwood Publishing Group. ISBN 978-0-313-27407-7.
- Spada, James (1984). The Films of Robert Redford. London: Citadel Press. ISBN 978-0-806-50898-6.
- Turner, Roland; Podell, Janet (1980). The Annual Obituary. New York: St. Martin's Press. ISBN 978-0-333-32502-5.
- Uglow, Jenny; Hendry, Maggy (2005). The Palgrave Macmillan Dictionary of Women's Biography (Fourth ed.). New York: Palgrave Macmillan. ISBN 978-0-230-50577-3.
