= Vittorio Gelmetti =

Italian composer

Vittorio Gelmetti (Milan, April 26, 1926 - Florence, February 4, 1992) was an Italian composer. In the late 1950's, Gelmetti composed electronic music and later on incorporated elements of this into music theater and instrumental works. He is best known for his soundtracks to movies, TV and radio.

== Works ==
=== Soundtracks ===
- Red Desert (1964)
- Ricordati di Haron (1966)
- La tana (1967)
- Hermitage (1968)
- His Day of Glory (1969)
- Come ti chiami, amore mio? (1969)
- Il sasso in bocca (1969)
- Sierra Maestra (1969)
- Under the Sign of Scorpio (1969)
- La llamada del vampiro (1972)
- Non ho tempo (1973)
- ...E di Saul e dei sicari sulle vie di Damasco (1973)
- Bene! Quattro diversi modi di morire in versi: Majakovskij-Blok-Esènin-Pasternak (1977) (TV)
- One Hundred Days in Palermo (1984)
- 0567 - Appunti per un documentario su Pozzuoli (1987)
- Angelus novus (1987)
