= Anneliese Eilers =

German anthropologist (1900–1953)

Anneliese Eilers (born 1900 in Hamburg; died 1953) was a German ethnologist known for her research on Micronesian culture. She was among the first women in Germany to receive an academic degree in anthropology and is known for her scientific contribution to the ethnography of Micronesia as results of the Hamburger Südsee-Expedition (Hamburg South Seas Expedition). She herself had never been to Oceania and compiled the ethnographic monographs she worked on “from notes, diary entries, photographs, and other “documents” of the expedition”. Paul Hambruch died in 1933.

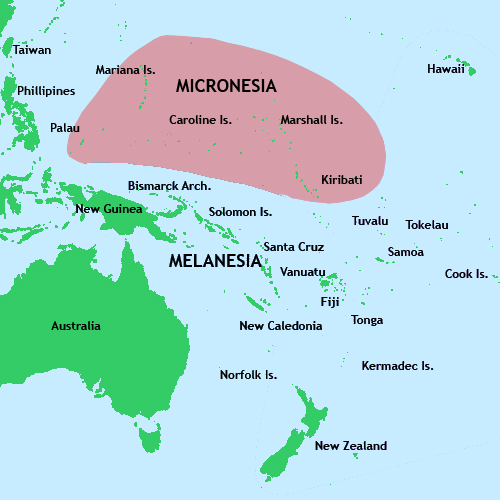
Micronesian Cultural Area (map)

== Life and education ==
Anneliese Eilers was born in Hamburg in 1900. Her father was a high-ranking clerk at the local German Post Office. She spent her childhood and youth in Hamburg and completed her secondary education in 1922.

In the same year, Eilers began her studies in anthropology, phonetics, and African languages at the newly founded Hamburg University. Her teachers included Carl Meinhof, Georg Thilenius, Paul Hambruch, and Maria von Tiling. In 1925, she continued her studies at the Eberhard Karl University of Tübingen, where Adolf Basler was among her instructors.

After returning to Hamburg, Eilers graduated in 1927 with a thesis on social relations among Bantu children. Her doctorate placed her among the first women in Germany to obtain an academic degree in anthropology.

== Career and research ==
Following her graduation, Eilers focused on ethnographic research in the South Pacific. She published three volumes on the remote Southwest Islands, which are culturally closer to Yap but politically part of the Republic of Palau. These studies were conducted during the Hamburger Südsee-Expedition (South Pacific expedition) of the Hamburg Ethnological Museum.

Eilers also edited, systematized, and published the ethnographic work of Paul Hambruch on Ponape Island (now Pohnpei), incorporating her comparative analyses of neighboring regions in Micronesia. Her research was financially supported by forerunner of the German Research Foundation (Deutsche Forschungsgemeinschaft, DFG).

When she wrote (in 1934) the report on Nukuoro for the Hamburg South Seas Expedition of 1908–1910, she drew on the reports of Kubary (1846–1896) and Jeschke (1877–1959), for — as she noted — “through the advance of the mission, of course, the indigenous cult on the island had been completely destroyed”.

Anneliese Eilers died in an accident in 1953.

According to a report of the German Federal Foreign Office (Auswärtiges Amt) in 2025, the so-called “Krämer” volumes of the German South Seas Expedition (1907–1910) by the German ethnologists Augustin Krämer (1864–1941) and Anneliese Eilers remain relevant today: The records contained in the seven volumes are still recognized by Palauan courts as the only authentic source in cases of land or tribal disputes. In the absence of written records, the “Krämer” records constitute the codified memory of Palauan culture and identity, which is threatened by modern ways of life. The German Federal Foreign Office financially supported the translation of these records into English.

== Publications ==
- Die sozialen Beziehungen des Kindes bei den Bantunegern. Helm & Torton, Leipzig, 1927 (Inaugural-Dissertation Universität Hamburg 1927).

In Ergebnisse der Südsee-Expedition 1908-1910 (in the subseries 2: Ethnographie B: Mikronesien):

- Band 7: Ponape. Paul Hambruch und Anneliese Eilers
  - Teilband 1: Allgemeiner Teil: Geschichte, Geographie, Sprache, Eingeborene Verfasser. Paul Hambruch. Friederichsen, De Gruyter, Hamburg 1932 (Online)
  - Teilband 2: Gesellschaft und geistige Kultur, Wirtschaft und stoffliche Kultur Verfasser. Paul Hambruch und Anneliese Eilers. Friederichsen, De Gruyter, Hamburg 1936
  - Teilband 3: Die Ruinen. Ponapegeschichten. Paul Hambruch. Friederichsen, De Gruyter, Hamburg 1936 (Online)
- Band 8: Inseln um Ponape: Kapingamarangi, Nukuor, Ngatik, Mokil, Pingelap. Anneliese Eilers. Friederichsen, De Gruyter, Hamburg 1934
- Band 9: Westkarolinen. Anneliese Eilers
  - Halbband 1: Songosor, Pur, Merir. Friederichsen, De Gruyter, Hamburg 1935
  - Halbband 2: Tobi und Ngulu. Anneliese Eilers. Friederichsen, De Gruyter, Hamburg 1936

== See also ==
- Hamburger Südsee-Expedition (in German)
- Richard Parkinson

== Bibliography ==
- Bettina Beer: Frauen in der deutschsprachigen Ethnologie: Ein Handbuch. Böhlau Verlag 2007 (pp. 84–88)
- Brigitta Hauser-Schäublin (ed.): Ethnologische Frauenforschung: Ansätze, Methoden, Resultate. Reimer, Berlin 1991
- Rainer F. Buschmann: Anthropology's Global Histories The Ethnographic Frontier in German New Guinea, 1870-1935. 2009 (in partial view)
