= Helge Burggrabe =

German recorder player

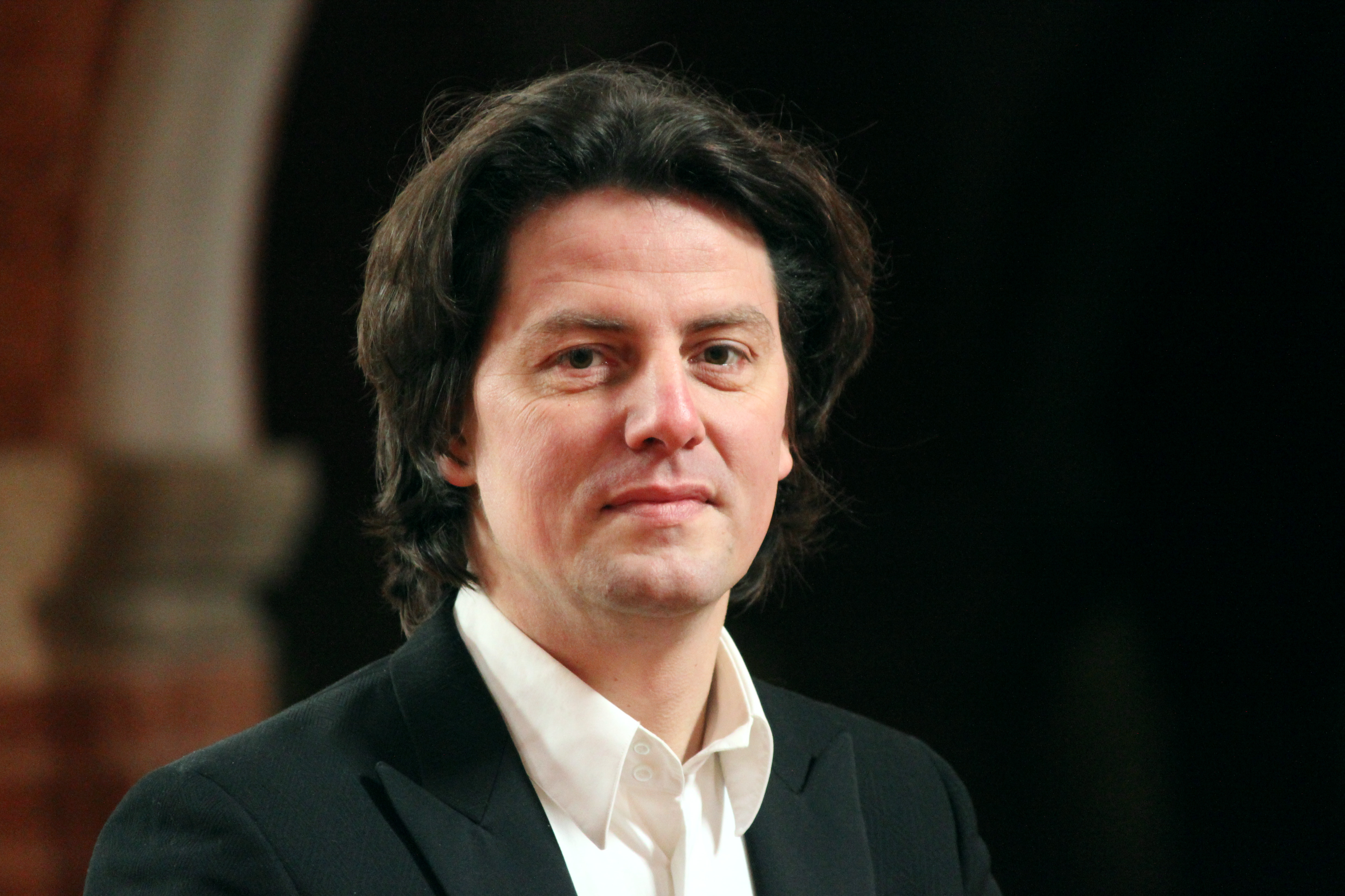
Helge Burggrabe, composer and flutist (2013)

Helge Burggrabe (born 17 June 1973) in Magstadt is a German composer, recorder player, stage designer and seminar leader.

== Life ==
As a child, Burggrabe lived for several years in Burma (Myanmar). Later he had lessons with Hans-Jürgen Hufeisen, among others, and studied at the Hochschule für Musik und Theater Hamburg with Evi Pfefferle-Darmstadt and Peter Michael Hamel. His diploma thesis dealt with Die Proportionsverhältnisse und ihre Widerspiegelung in Musik und Architektur am Beispiel der Kathedrale von Chartres. (Proportional relationships and their reflection in music and architecture using the example of Chartres Cathedral).

Since 1993, Burggrabe has performed throughout Europe with his own concert series, especially in Germany, France, Switzerland and Austria. Burggrabe works in various ensembles, including "Duo3" with the pianist Christof Fankhauser and the duo "Resonatus" with the singer Victoria Walker.

Since the mid-1990s, several projects have dealt with the symbol and cultural history of the labyrinth as well as with the Chartres Cathedral, where Burggrabe's Marian oratorio Stella Maris was premiered in 2006. As a stage designer and landscape artist, Burggrabe built several labyrinths, including two permanent ones in northern Germany.

== Work ==
Burggrabe's concert programmes are usually thematically oriented and often combine music with various other arts, for example poetry], with architecture, with photography and live painting, with dance performances.

Burggrabe's compositions can be roughly divided into two areas. In the joint works with Christof Fankhauser, his music is primarily characterised by a novel combination of classical music and jazz, often interspersed with improvisational elements that also reveal influences from folk music, klezmer and pop music. Examples of this are the concertante composition Rose - Hommage an einen Mythos (2003) and the children's music theatre project Kinderplanet/Planet Bunterkunt (1999 and 2006 respectively) as well as a joint tour with the crossover cellist Jost H. Hecker from the Modern String Quartet (2008).

Since 2004, Burggrabe's preoccupation with Chartres Cathedral and with philosophical and spiritual themes has been increasingly reflected in his music. For the project Resonatus, mainly performed in Romanesque churches, Burggrabe combined elements of Gregorian chant and his own compositions for flute, voice and monochord. Burggrabe wrote the libretto with the Benedictine monk Anselm Grün, with whom he later also published the joint book and CD project Zeiten der Stille.

== Stella Maris, Blaues Oratorium 2006 ==
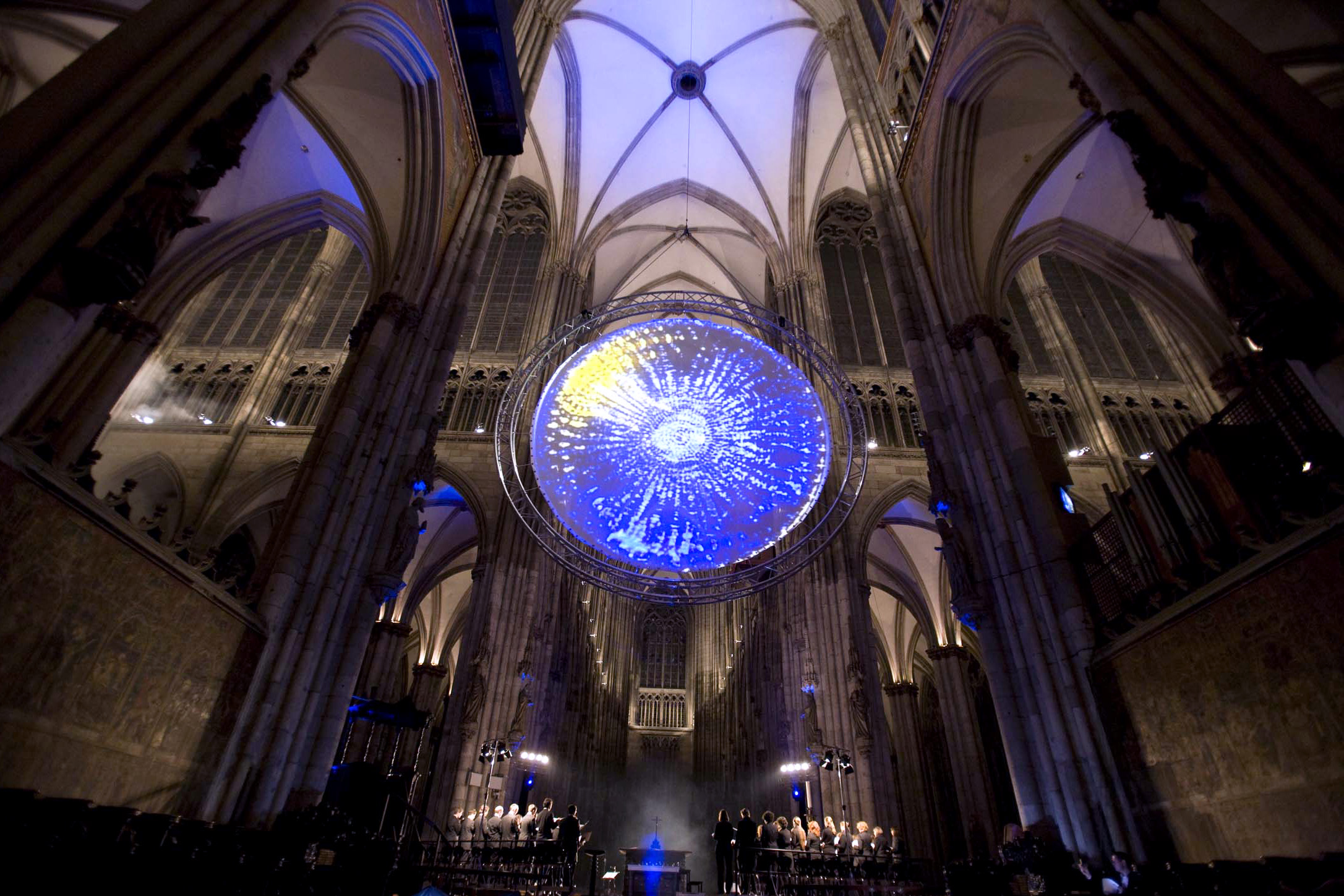
Picture from the performance of the oratorio Stella Maris by Burggrabe in Cologne Cathedral on 2 May 2008

Burggrabe achieved his own musical language with the Marian oratorio Stella Maris, 8 September 2006. Inspired by the colouring of the windows in Chartres, it is also called the Blue Oratorio In it, Burggrabe, who is also responsible for the libretto, combines texts handed down from Fulbert of Chartres with modern poetry and, on the musical side, medieval compositions with a very contemporary musical aesthetic (influenced among others by György Ligeti).

Participants in the premiere, which was conceived as a "concertante Gesamtkunstwerk for music, space, language, water and light", included others Graciela de Gyldenfeldt (soprano), Hiam Abbass (narration), Emmanuelle Bertrand (cello), Patrick Delabre (organ), the Harvestehuder Kammerchor and a choir from Chartres as well as Michael Batz (light installations) and Alexander Lauterwasser (WaterSoundProjections). The overall musical direction was by Claus Bantzer, Burggrabe himself was responsible for choreography and staging and played the flute parts.

The creation and premiere of the oratorio were documented in a film by NDR, which was first broadcast on Arte in March 2007.

The German premiere also took place in September 2006 in the St. Johannis Harvestehude Hamburg church. After two performances in autumn 2007 in the Maria, Königin des Friedens at Neviges, the largest performance to date took place in early May 2008 in the packed Cologne Cathedral. The new cathedral window by Gerhard Richter played an important role in the production there. The speaking role of Maria was taken over by the actress Iris Berben in the German-language concerts.

== Jehoschua, Rotes Oratorium 2008 ==
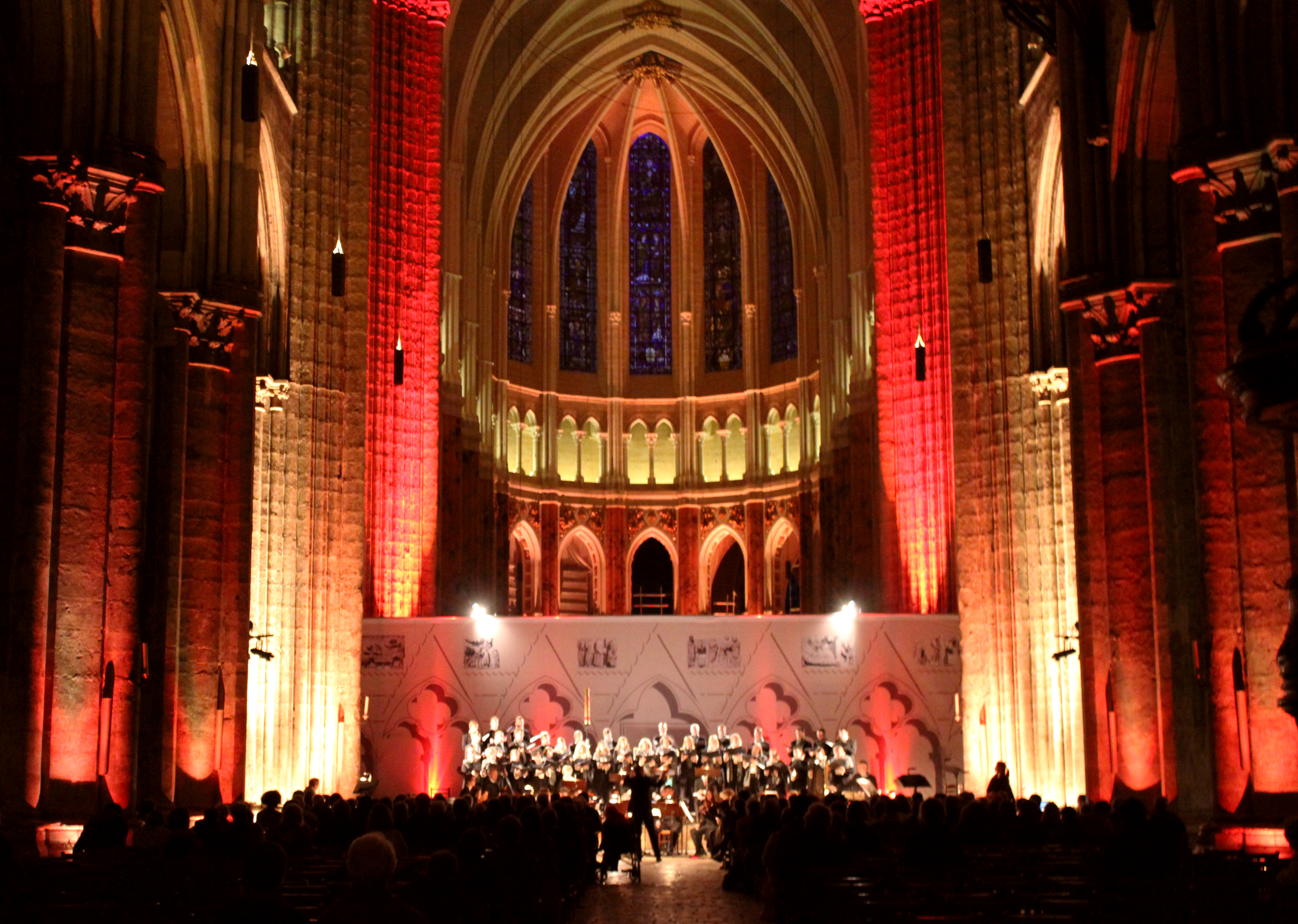
Picture from the performance of the oratorio Jehoshua by Burggrabe in Chartres Cathedral on 19 May 2012.

A new spiritual work by Burggrabe was premiered in May 2008. The libretto for Jehoshua - Oratorio of the Incarnation was written by the theologian Kurt Dantzer and consists of biblical texts and Psalms. The focus is on the life and work of Jesus Christ, the artistic starting point being the vowels I-E-O-U-A contained in his Hebrew name Jehoshua. The core pieces of the chapters are stories from the Gospels: Jesus heals a blind man, Jesus meets tax collectors, three women and teaches people with the parable of the Good Samaritan.

Musically, the combination of solo clarinet (in the premiere Johannes Peitz), cello, percussion and chamber orchestra as well as solo vocals (soprano, alto, tenor) and chamber choir is the focus of this commissioned work, which was created under the patronage of the then Prime Minister of Lower Saxony Christian Wulff. A painter contributed live calligraphies.

The Neue Presse Hanover wrote of the premiere: "Burggrabe's music has the seriousness and sublimity of church music by Johann Sebastian Bach. Fugue-like chorales and arias lean towards the style of the father of church music. At the same time, Burggrabe manages the balancing act to modernity and provides goosebumps with meditative choral pieces and promising, sometimes jubilant, sometimes lamenting solo arias." The Hannoversche Allgemeine Zeitung placed Jehoshua musically between John Rutter and Benjamin Britten.

== Lux in Tenebris, Weißes Oratorium 2015 ==
The work Lux in Tenebris (Light in the Darkness) was commissioned on the occasion of the 1200th anniversary of the Diocese of Hildesheim. The libretto for the two-hour work is a joint work by Helge Burggrabe, Reinhard Göllner and Angela Krumpen. All four choirs at the Hildesheim Cathedral were involved in the performance: the cathedral choir, chamber choir, girls' choir and Schola. The premiere took place with four performances on 14-17 May 2015. Participants in the premiere were Martina Gedeck (recitation), ElbtonalPercussion, Geraldine Zeller (soprano), Anne Bierwirth (alto), Manuel König (tenor), KMD Helmut Langenbruch (organ), string quartet, wind trio of the Hildesheim Cathedral Music conducted by Cathedral Music Director Thomas Viezens and Cathedral Cantor Dr. Stefan Mahr; light and video art: Michael Suhr and media.plus X.

== Publications ==
- 1999 Kinderplanet (CD, with Christof Fankhauser and Hartmut Burggrabe; Silberburg-Verlag, Tübingen)
- 2003 Rose - Hommage an einen Mythos (CD, with Christof Fankhauser; L'art du Piano, Bern)
- 2004 Resonatus - Oratorium der Stille für Flöte, Stimme und Monochord (CD, with Victoria Walker; Claudius Verlag, Munich)
- 2005 Klänge des Labyrinths (CD, with Christof Fankhauser; Kösel Verlag, Munich)
- 2006 Zeiten der Stille (book and 2 CDs, with Anselm Grün and Iris Berben; Claudius Verlag, Munich)
- 2006 Planet Bunterkunt (book, with Christof Fankhauser and Hartmut Burggrabe; Voggenreiter Verlag, Bonn)
- 2007 Planet Bunterkunt (CD, with Christof Fankhauser)
- 2008 Stella Maris - Chartres Oratorium (Double-DVD with two films and bonus material, Hänssler Classic & Claudius Verlag)
- 2008 Duo3 live! (CD, with Christof Fankhauser and Jost-H. Hecker)
- 2010 Jehoschua - Rotes Oratorium (Double-CD, Oehms Classics)
- 2011 Konzert der Stille (DVD, Concert filming from Bad Gandersheim Cathedral)
- 2011 Chartres - Lauschen mit der Seele: Eine spirituelle Entdeckungsreise (book, with Tilman Evers, Stefanie Spessart-Evers, Heike Radeck u. Ingrid Riedel; Kösel Verlag Munich)
- 2015 Lux in Tenebris - Weißes Oratorium (Double-CD and DVD, Bernward Medien / Hildesheimer Dommusik)
- 2015 Hagios - Gesungenes Gebet (CD, with Christof Fankhauser and vocal ensemble Elbcanto, Edel / Berlin Classics)
- 2018 Hagios II - Gesänge zur Andacht und Meditation (CD, with Christof Fankhauser, Vokalensemble Elbcanto und Streichensemble, edel / Berlin Classics)
- 2020 Stella Maris - Blaues Oratorium (first recording on double CD, with Dommusik Speyer, Julia Jentsch, Alexandra Busch, Olivia Jeremias among others, Hänssler Classic)
