= Hallerstraße station =

Railway station in Hamburg, Germany

Hallerstraße
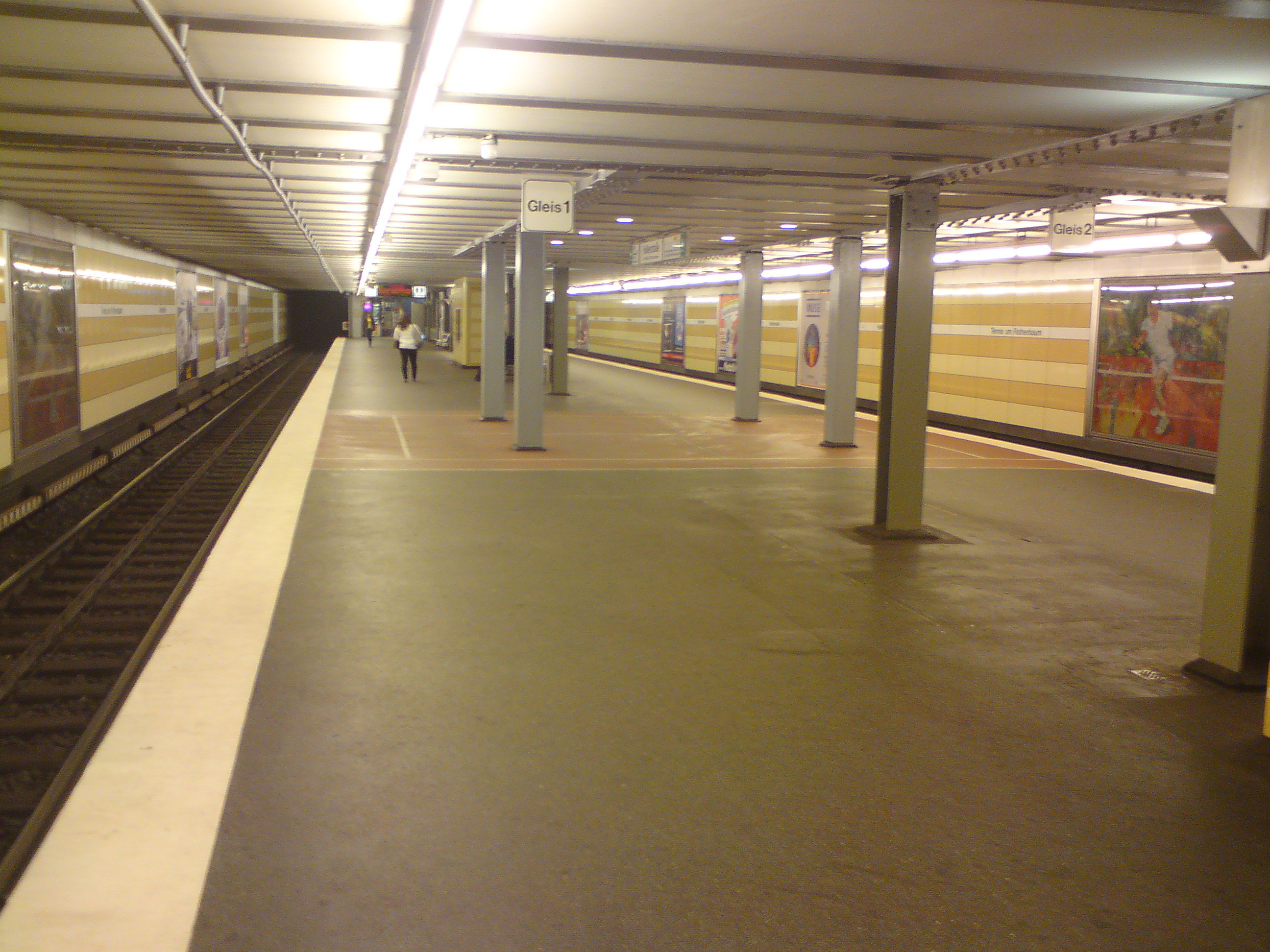

General information
- Location: Hamburg; Germany
- Coordinates: 53.572844°N 9.988998°E
- System: Hamburg U-Bahn station
- Operator: Hamburger Hochbahn AG
- Line: U1
- Platforms: 1 island platform
- Tracks: 2

Construction
- Structure type: Underground
- Accessible: Yes

Other information
- Station code: HHA: HR
- Fare zone: HVV: A/000

History
- Opened: 2 June 1929; 97 years ago
- Former names: 1938-1945 Ostmarkstraße

Services
Preceding station	Hamburg U-Bahn	Following station
Klosterstern towards Norderstedt Mitte	U1	Stephansplatz towards Großhansdorf or Ohlstedt
Location
- Location within Hamburg Location within Germany

Hallerstraße station is a metro station served by Hamburg U-Bahn line U1. It is located in Rotherbaum, in the Hamburg borough of Eimsbüttel was opened in 1929.

== Location ==
The station is located at the intersection of Rothenbaumchaussee, one of Hamburg's major thoroughfares, and Hallerstraße, famous for the tennis park complex Am Rothenbaum, venue of the annual German Open Tennis Championships. The street junction itself is also defined by the Rotherbaum Multimedia Centre, a large office complex designed by Norman Foster and completed in 1999.

== See also ==
- List of Hamburg U-Bahn stations

== Gallery ==
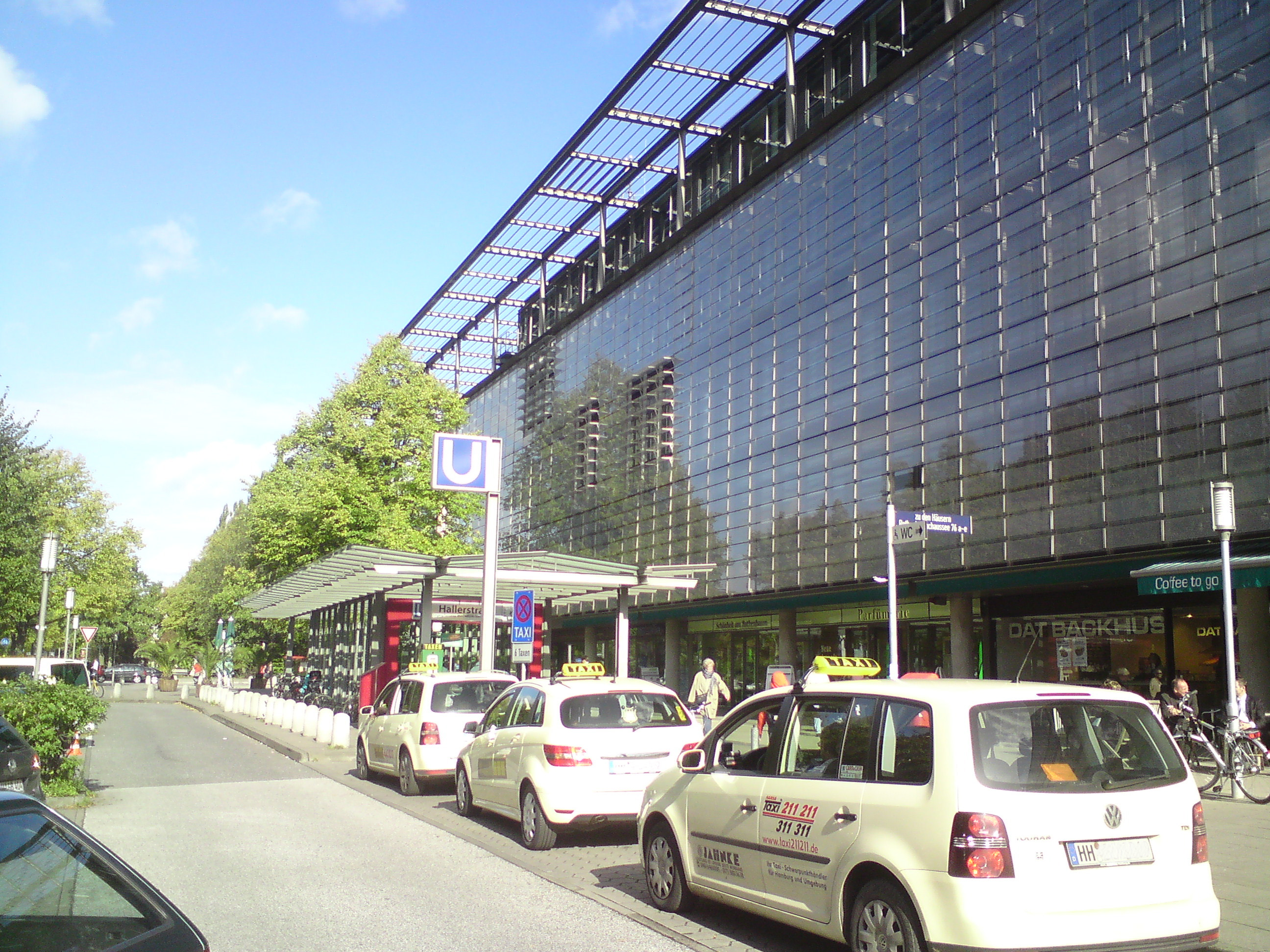
One of the station's entrances
