= Harvestehuder Kammerchor =

German mixed choir

The Harvestehuder Kammerchor is a mixed choir from Hamburg, which has existed since 1980.

== History and repertoire ==
The choir was founded in 1980 by Kirchenmusikdirektor and composer Claus Bantzer, who was cantor at St. Johannis Harvestehude Hamburg. The chamber choir rehearsed at this church, gave regular concerts and also played a musical role in church services. Until 2008, St. Johannis-Harvestehude was also the sponsor of the chamber choir; with Bantzer's retirement from St. Johannis, the sponsorship passed to a supporting association.

The focus of the chamber choir is on the performance of experimental music that combines different eras and styles, as well as bringing music together with other arts through forms of cross-over. The choir's repertoire includes classical and romantic choral music as well as numerous 20th century compositions, especially jazz music.

There have been among others concert tours to France and Italy. A highlight was the world premiere of the oratorio Stella maris by Helge Burggrabe in September 2006 in Chartres on the occasion of the 1000th anniversary of the Cathedral there.

Claus Bantzer relinquished the direction of the choir in December 2017. Since 2018, Edzard Burchards has been the choir's director, who is not professionally associated with St. Johannis-Harvestehude. With this, the chamber choir left the parish, and found a new home in the Epiphanienkirche in Hamburg-Winterhude.

== CD publications (selection) ==
- Jehoschua : Rotes Oratorium, composition Helge Burggrabe, conductor Claus Bantzer, Oehms Classics 2010.
- Symphony No. 2 in C minor : Resurrection Symphony by Mahler, direction Claus Bantzer, Musicaphon 2009.
- Reflections / Selbstbildnisse, composition and conducting by Claus Bantzer, Oehms Classics 2003.
- Es kommt ein Schiff, geladen..., Advents- und Weihnachtsmusik, conductor Claus Bantzer, Arte Nova (Sony BMG) 2000.
- Das Hohelied Salomos, Eine Sammlung Liebeslieder, conducting Claus Bantzer, Arte Nova (Sony BMG) 1999.
- Geistliche Kreise / Sacred circles with Ruth Zechlin, conducting Claus Bantzer, BMG Ariola 1999.
- Chormusik der Romantik, conducting Claus Bantzer, Arte Nova (Sony BMG) 1997.
- Johannes Brahms: Weltliche Chorwerke, Leitung Claus Bantzer, Arte Nova (Sony BMG) 1997.
- Mariengesänge, conducting Claus Bantzer, Arte Nova (Sony BMG) 1996.
