= Hans-Jürgen Hufeisen =

German recorder player

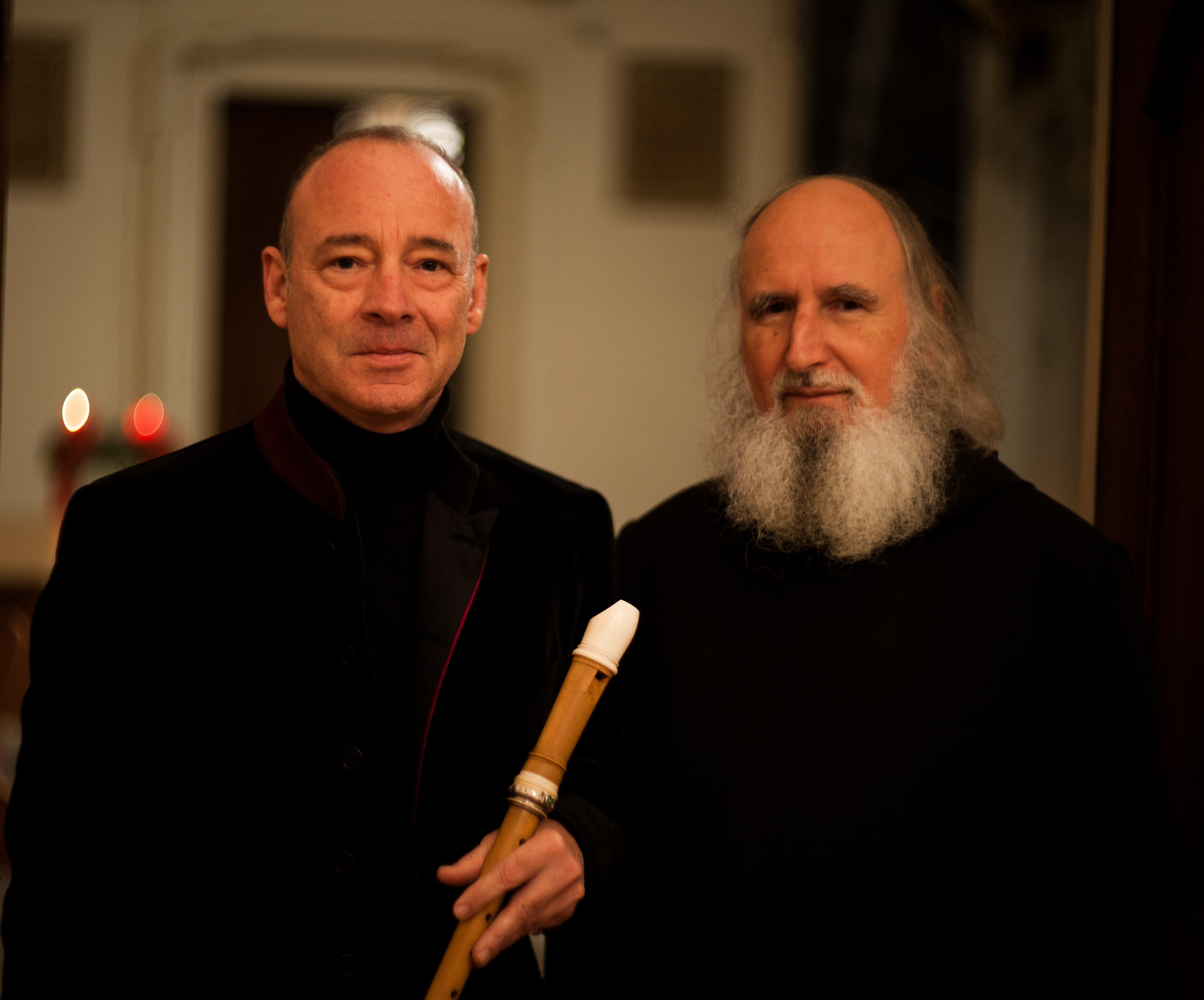
Hans-Jürgen Hufeisen (left), with Pater Anselm Grün

Hans-Jürgen Hufeisen (born 10 February 1954) is a German recorder player and composer.

== Life ==
Horseshoe was born in a hotel room in Anrath). His mother, a travelling saleswoman from the Allgäu, had kept the pregnancy a secret. Two days after the birth, she abandoned her son; the hotelier found the infant under a bedspread. On 12 February 1954, the Youth Welfare Office took care of the foundling and brought him to a Catholic baby home in Lobberich. On Boxing Day, he was baptised Protestant with the name Hans-Jürgen; the mother had instructed a midwife to do this before she left. Hufeisen went to live with a foster mother and in 1957 to the Protestant children's home Haus Sonneck of Neukirchen-Vluyn. There a governess discovered Hufeisen's musical talent and taught him Christian evening songs and how to play the recorder.

Hufeisen won prizes at regional competitions of "Jugend musiziert"; from 1972 to 1977 he studied recorder, music education and composition at the Folkwang University of the Arts. Meanwhile, from 1974 to 1978, he was employed as a lecturer at the International Children's and Young People's Book Fair in Duisburg, and from 1975 to 1977 as a lecturer at the Folkwang University of Music. From 1977 to 1991, he worked as a regional consultant for musical and cultural education at the Evangelical-Lutheran Church in Württemberg. During this time, he passed his concert exam at the Hochschule für Musik Karlsruhe with Gerhard Braun in 1981. Since 1991, he has worked as a freelance composer, producer and musician. The artist now lives in Zurich.

His interpretations and compositions for the recorder, in which he likes to engage with existing church music, are mostly meditative and melodic. In his solo pieces and concertante works, he draws mainly on classical models such as Johann Sebastian Bach or Baroque artists. But he also draws inspiration from folk songs and music from other cultures. In addition to various recorders, he also uses piano, percussion, string instruments and other instruments.

Hufeisen's works develop from the essence of Christian culture. His basic attitude leads him to a tolerant attitude. "All religions have a common goal: they want peace and love in the world." That is why he performs with musicians who belong to other religions and cultures.

Since 1983, he has created large stage works (music, choreography and texts) for the German Evangelical Church Assembly, among others. In the process, he worked together with the theologians Jörg Zink (Creation, The Song of the Four Elements), Walter Hollenweger from Switzerland (Bonhoeffer Requiem, Easter Dance of Women), Anselm Grün (Easter Joy, Divine Child), John O'Donohue from Ireland (Anam Cara), Zephania Kameeta from Namibia (Seasons of the Heart - A Dialogue with Africa), Ulrich Schaffer (The Journey into One's Heart), Margot Käßmann (Creation Time 2007 / Mothers of the Bible - Children of the Bible 2010 / The Wise Men 2011 / Longing for Life 2012, Message of the Angels 2012), Frieder Gadesmann, Kisses, Sweeter than Wine (2012) and Christoph Sigrist as librettist for The Zwingli File - A Mystery Play 2016 in Zurich (director: Volker Hesse). Another significant work was performed in Wallis/Switzerland in 1999: "Der helle Morgenstern", a stage work on the Apocalypse.

In addition to the large stage works, Hufeisen composed a large number of Lieder that can be sung in church services and devotions. The theologian Jörg Zink wrote the texts for them. "We would like to encourage all those who see themselves as Christians or would like to, to take up what we offer here" write the two in the preface to the book "Wie wir feiern können". In it they also encourage liturgical and meditative dances and thus, by their own admission, take up old Christian practice. "When we consider how poor our services are in movements and gestures, we are no longer surprised when they are simply shunned by many as boring and meaningless."

According to Hufeisen, the dramatic circumstances of his birth contributed to his enormous musical creativity. "This start has forever brought a dark side into my life. I can't get rid of that. I have to carry that around with me and keep it inside me." Music had "carried him out of this darkness into the light. For this reason he told the journalist Uwe Birnstein his life story on the occasion of his 60th birthday. It was published under the title "Das unglaubliche Leben des Flötenspielers Hans-Jürgen Hufeisen" by Verlag Herder and attracted great media attention.

The difficult relationship with his mother, who died in 2007, throughout his life also became an inspiration to him. "I have written a lot of music pieces where I know today: this has actually always had something to do with this mother, it always has something to do with birth and life. Music helps me to express the world of the soul within me - when I put it into an external form, namely into sound, then it's something like a liberation."

== Students ==
Hufeisen also taught recorder. His students include Helge Burggrabe and Matthias Beck.

== Work ==
=== Discography ===
- Blockflöte – Impressionen zu Skulpturen by Ernst Barlach (1979)
- The melody in my fantasy (1980)
- Menschlich (1982)
- Der Morgenstern (1982)
- Liveaufzeichnung Stadthalle Sindelfingen (1983)
- Flötentöne (1984)
- Durchbruch (1984)
- Die Neue Flöte (1987)
- Domino (1989)
- Und es ward Abend und Morgen (1990)
- Eremitage (1991)
- Inmitten der Nacht (1991)
- Engelkonzert (1992)
- Wie wir feiern können (1992)
- Feier der Schöpfung (1993)
- Tausend und eine Nachtmusik (1994)
- Pegasus – Melodien der vier Winde (1994)
- Abendstern (1995)
- Abendsegen (1995)
- Himmelsflöte (1995)
- Live! (1996)
- Zaubertöne aus neun Flöten (1997)
- Eden (1997)
- Gloria – Eine Liedermesse (1997)
- Gottesklang (1998)
- Unter dem Lindenbaum (1998)
- Weihnachtsflöte (1999)
- Der helle Morgenstern (2000)
- Mein Schutzengel (2000/2004)
- Gold, Weihrauch und Flöte (2001)
- Friedensflöte (2002)
- Christrose (2002)
- Segen (2003)
- Sonnenlicht (2004)
- Stern über Bethlehem (2004)
- Himmelslichter (2005)
- Kindertraumland (2005)
- Jauchzet frohlocket (2005)
- Weihnachtsstern (2006)
- Jahreszeiten des Herzens (2006)
- Abendstille (2007)
- Marienkonzert (2007)
- Sinfonie der Engel (2008)
- SEIN – Musik von innen (2008)
- Raum für meine Seele (2009)
- Einfach klassisch (2010)
- Einfach mutig sein (2010)
- Einfach glücklich sein (2010)
- Ganz weihnachtlich (2010)
- Ganz beflügelt sein (2011)
- Ganz im Einklang sein (2011)
- Ganz hoffnungsvoll (2011)
- Einfach Weihnachtsfreude (2011)
- Einfach segensreich (2011)
- Weihnachtsengel (2011)
- Einfach willkommen sein (2012)
- Einfach besinnlich werden (2012)
- Einfach zur Stille kommen (2013)
- Einfach froh sein (2013)
- Gabriel – Freude und Ermutigung (2013)
- Engel des Lichts (2013)
- Raphael – Heilung und Stärkung (2014)
- Engel der Liebe (2014)
- In dir ist Freude (2014)
- Einfach dem Wunder die Hand reichen (2015)
- Einfach den Tag genießen (2015)
- Einfach achtsam sein (2015)
- Die heilende Kraft der Weihnachtslieder (2015)
- Die Akte Zwingli – Ein Mysterienspiel – Auftakte (2015)
- Einfach aufatmen (2016)
- Einfach aufblühen und leben (2016)
- Einfach den Tag ausklingen lassen (2016)
- Bilder der Sehnsucht (2016)
- Einfach die Stille hören (2017)
- Einfach das Leben feiern (2017)
- Einfach den Bäumen lauschen (2017)
- Einfach Lust auf Leben (2018)
- Einfach träumen (2018)
- Taumond (2018)
- Wie ist die Welt so stille (2018)
- Zeit für die Seele (2019)
- Zeit zum Aufblühen (2019)
- Zeit für Träume (2019)
- Tröstliche Zeit. Zeit für mich (2019)
- Vierzehn Engel um mich stehn (2019)
- Kraft des Segens (2020)

=== Audio books ===
- Vom Vierten König, eine alte Legende neu erzählt (2008)
- Wie das Licht in die Welt kam (2009)
- Der glückliche Prinz (2010)
- Vom vergessenen Weihnachtsengel (2010)
- Das Geheimnis von Onkel Neuchs Geige (2011)
- Das Lied des alten Meisters (2011)
- Das Märchen von der kleinen Melodie (2011)
- Das Märchen von der Schneerose (2012)
- Das Märchen vom allerschönsten Weihnachtsstern (2012)
- Das Märchen vom Flötenspieler (2013)

Together with Anselm Grün

- Tanze deine Sehnsucht (2002)
- Die Osterfreude (2002)
- Wenn du Gott erfahren willst (2003)
- Wunden zu Perlen (2004)
- Du bist die edle Rose (2006)
- Gerechtigkeit (2006)
- Du bist ein Segen (2005)
- Das Göttliches Kind (2005)
- Geh mit mir – Segensgebete für den Morgen (2007)
- Bleib bei mir – Segensgebete für den Abend (2007)
- Jauchzet ihr Himmel, frohlocket ihr Engel – Weihnachten mit Anselm Grün (2007)
- Halleluja lasst uns singen – Ostern mit Anselm Grün (2008)
- Engel, die dir begegnen (2009)
- Der Seele Raum geben – Heil werden mit Hildegard von Bingen (2009)
- Kleine Rituale (2011)
- Weihnachtsengel (2011)
- Bilder der Seele (2016)

Together with Margot Käßmann

- Weihnachtszeit (2006)
- Passionszeit (2007)
- Schöpfungszeit (2007)
- Sehnsucht nach Leben (2011)
- Botschaft der Engel (2012)

=== Books ===
- Die Bläserschule. Stuttgart 1976
- Die Bandschule. Munich 1985, ISBN 3-921946-04-2.
- with Jörg Zink: Wie wir feiern können. Freiburg/Brsg. 1992, ISBN 3-7831-1149-8 (since 2005 Dolce Musica Edezione Zürich / 55 spiritual Lieder created together with Jörg Zink )
- with Jörg Zink: Feier der Schöpfung. Freiburg/Brsg. 1993, ISBN 3-7831-1270-2 (since 2005 Dolce Musica Edezione Zürich)
- with Jörg Zink: Singvogel. Freiburg/Brsg. 1997, ISBN 3-7831-1517-5 (die Lieder Zink und Hufeisen sind hier zusammengefasst / since 2005 Dolce Musica Edezione Zürich)
- with Hildegunde Wöller: Mein Schutzengel. Freiburg/Brsg. 2000, ISBN 3-7831-1826-3.
- with Jörg Zink: Kraft des Segens. Eschbach 2004, ISBN 3-88671-281-8.
- Beseelte Orte – Irland. Zürich 2005
- Beseelte Orte – Jordanien. Zürich 2005
- with Jörg Zink: Einfach feiern. Eschbach 2007, ISBN 978-3-88671-564-0.
- Weihnachtsbuch. München 2007, ISBN 978-3-89912-092-9.
- Himmelsklang – Der Flötenkalender 2011. with Music-CD. Leipzig 2010, ISBN 978-3-7462-2702-3.
- Einfach segensreich. Eschbach 2011, ISBN 978-3-86917-071-8.
- Himmelsklang – Der Flötenkalender 2012. with Music-CD. Leipzig 2011, ISBN 978-3-7462-3090-0.
- Gabriel – Einen Engel schick ich dir. Eschbach 2013, ISBN 978-3-86917-271-2.
- Engel des Lichts – Einen Engel schick ich dir. Eschbach 2013, ISBN 978-3-86917-270-5.
- Raphael – Einen Engel schick ich dir. Eschbach 2014, ISBN 978-3-86917-306-1.
- Engel der Liebe – Einen Engel schick ich dir. Eschbach 2014, ISBN 978-3-86917-307-8.
- Der Himmel klingt in dir. Stuttgart 2015, ISBN 978-3-460-50013-6.
- Wie ist die Welt so stille. Die heilende Kraft der Abendlieder. with Music-CD. Eschbach 2018, ISBN 978-3-86917-679-6.
- Abendstern. (Notenbuch), Munich 2018, ISBN 978-3-89912-208-4
- Vierzehn Engel um mich stehn. Schutzengel und andere himmlische Boten. with Musik-CD. with pictures by Edward Coley Burne-Jones, Eschbach 2019, ISBN 978-3-86917-758-8
- Kraft des Segens. Worte und Melodien aus Irland. with Music-CD. With photos by Hans-Jürgen Hufeisen, Eschbach 2020, ISBN 978-3-86917-834-9
