= Rothenbaumchaussee =

Street in Hamburg, Germany

Coordinates: 53.5709°N 9.9885°E

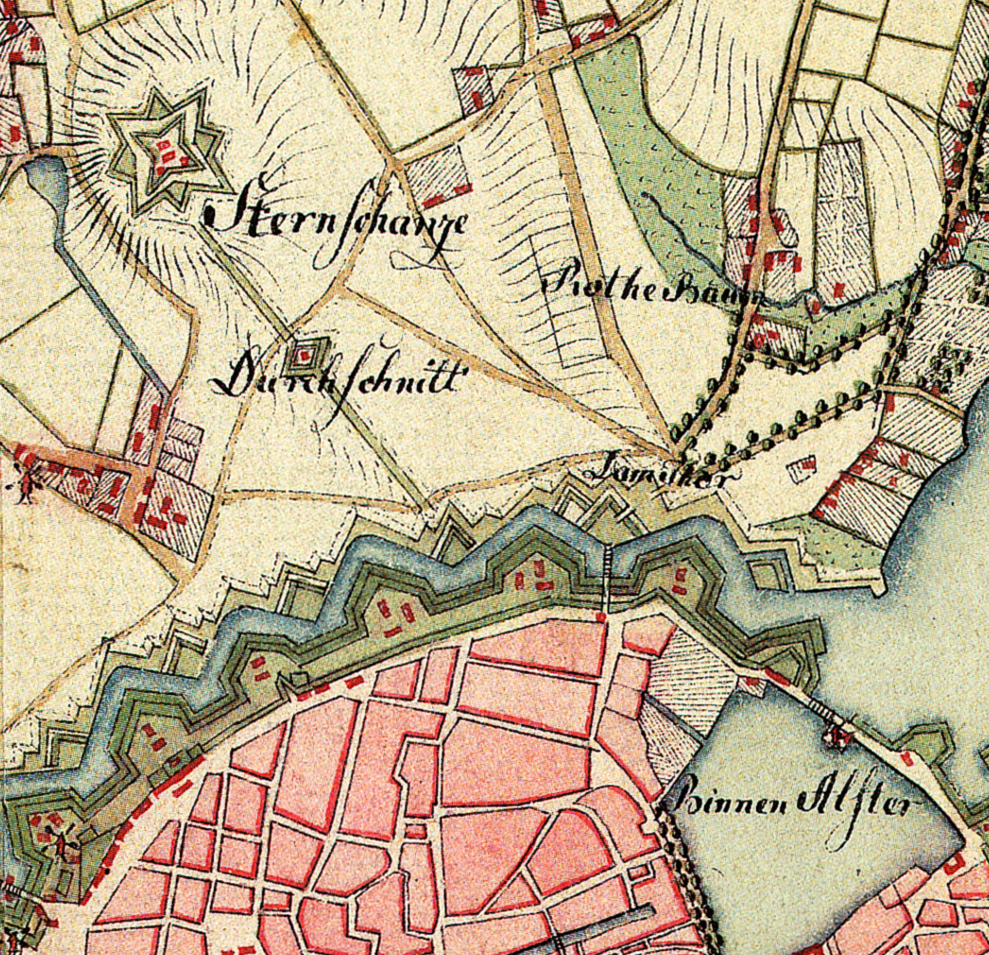
The Rothe Baum around 1790 (upper right) at the avenue over the Hundebek stream

The Rothenbaumchaussee is an inner-city street in the Hamburg quarters of Rotherbaum and Harvestehude. It runs from the Edmund-Siemers-Allee at Hamburg Dammtor station to the Klosterstern square.

== History ==
The name Rotherbaum derives from a former sentry post at the time of city fortification. The post was at the starting point of the road to Eppendorf, at a crossing over a stream called Hundebek and is said to have had a red turnpike (German: Schlagbaum), which the old German term Rother Baum or Der Rothe Baum (depending on grammatical context) refers to. Despite the modern spelling in one word and with historical th, the place and also the street name often occurs in diffracted form ("am Rothenbaum", "Rothenbaumchaussee").

== Buildings ==
At the Rothenbaumchaussee the Moorweidenpark with the Zombeck Tower, the Grand Elysée Hotel, the Faculty of Law of the University of Hamburg, the Curiohaus, the Museum of Ethnology Hamburg, now renamed to Museum am Rothenbaum, the underground station Hallerstraße, the Multimedia Centre Rotherbaum by Norman Foster with the local TV station Hamburg 1, the tennis stadium Am Rothenbaum, the NDR broadcasting studio and the underground station Klosterstern are located. Several buildings are listed.

== Sports ==
The Hamburg Half Marathon has its finishing line at Rothenbaumchaussee. The Sportplatz am Rothenbaum of the football club Hamburger SV as well as the office of the club were also located at Rothenbaumchaussee for many decades. At the location of the Sportplatz, among other buildings, the Multimedia Centre Rotherbaum was opened in 1999.
