= Wilhelm Müller-Wismar =

German ethnographer (1881–1916)

Wilhelm Müller-Wismar (20 May 1881 – 13 October 1916) was a German ethnographer.

A native of Wismar, he graduated in 1905 from the University of Berlin, where he studied ethnography and anthropology under Felix von Luschan (1854-1924).

From 1908 to 1910 he was a member of a scientific mission to the South Pacific that was coordinated by Georg Thilenius (1868-1937) of the Hamburg Museum of Ethnography. On the expedition he spent nine months on the island of Yap, about which an important scientific treatise was later published. He also took part in the Berlin-Indonesian expedition to the South Moluccas in 1913–14. Müller-Wismar died from typhoid on 10 October 1916, at the age of 35 in Malang, Java.

== Publications ==
- Beiträge zur Kraniologie der Neu-Britannier, Hamburg : Kommissionsverlag von L. Gräfe & Sillem, 1906 – Contributions involving the craniology of New Britons.
- Yap, Hamburg, L. Friederichsen & Co., 1917–18; part of the series "Ergebnisse der Südsee-expedition, 1908-1910"; work also translated into English.
