= Friedrich Fülleborn =

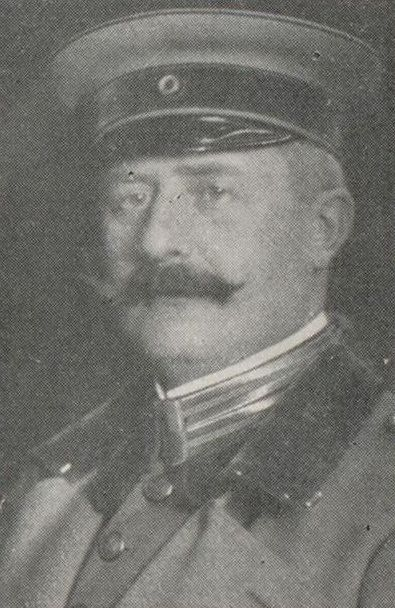
Friedrich Fülleborn

Friedrich Fülleborn (September 13, 1866 – September 9, 1933) was a physician who specialized in tropical medicine and parasitology. He was a native of Kulm, West Prussia, which today is known as Chełmno, Poland.

He studied medicine and natural sciences in Berlin, where one of his instructors was Heinrich Wilhelm Waldeyer (1835–1921). From 1896 onward, he was a military physician assigned to the Schutztruppe in German East Africa. In 1898–1900 he participated in the Nyassa- und Kingagebirgs Expedition to the southern part of the colony, where he conducted anthropological and ethnographic research.

In 1901 he became director of the Department of Tropical Hygiene and Tropical Medicine at the Hamburg Institute for Marine and Tropical Diseases. In 1908 he was appointed by Georg Thilenius (1868–1937) of the Hamburg Museum of Ethnology to head the "Hamburg South Seas Expedition", a scientific mission to the South Pacific. In 1930 he succeeded Bernhard Nocht (1857–1945) as director of the Hamburg Institute for Marine and Tropical Diseases, a position he maintained until his death in 1933.

During his career he took several tropical medical study trips to India, East Asia, the West Indies, etc. He is especially known for his filarian research and as an instructor of tropical medicine classes in Hamburg.

While working with dogs in Hamburg, he described "autoinfection" and discovered the migratory route taken by the parasite Strongyloides stercoralis prior to ending up in the intestine. The term "Fülleborn's method" is a procedure for examining parasitic ova in faecal matter.

== Legacy ==
Fülleborn is commemorated in the scientific name of a number of species including the chameleon Trioceros fuelleborni, the cichlid fish Labeotropheus fuelleborni, and the bird Fülleborn's longclaw Macronyx fuelleborni.

The Tanzanian Moth Neocoenyra fulleborni Thurau, 1903

== Published works ==
- Das deutsche Njassa- und Ruwuma-gebiet, land und leute, nebst bemerkungen über die Schire-Länder. : Mit benutzung von ergebnissen der Njassa- und Kingagebirgs-expedition der Hermann und Elise geb. Heckmann Wentzel-stiftung (1906) – The German Nyassa and Ruwuma region, the country and its people; along with remarks on the Shire-regions: written with the use of results from the Nyassa and Kinga Mountains expedition of the Hermann and Elise Wentzel (née Heckmann) Foundation.
- Filariosen des Menschen (1929) – Human filariasis.

== Sources ==
- This article incorporates translated text from an equivalent article at the German Wikipedia, whose sources include: Stefan Wulf: Fülleborn, Friedrich. In: Hamburgische Biography, Volume 5, Wallenstein, Göttingen 2010 ISBN 978-3-8353-0640-0, p 123-125
- Dorlands Medical Dictionary (definition of eponym)
