= Sportplatz at Rothenbaum =

Football stadium in Hamburg, Germany

Coordinates: 53°34′18.37″N 9°59′25.96″E

Sportplatz am Rothenbaum
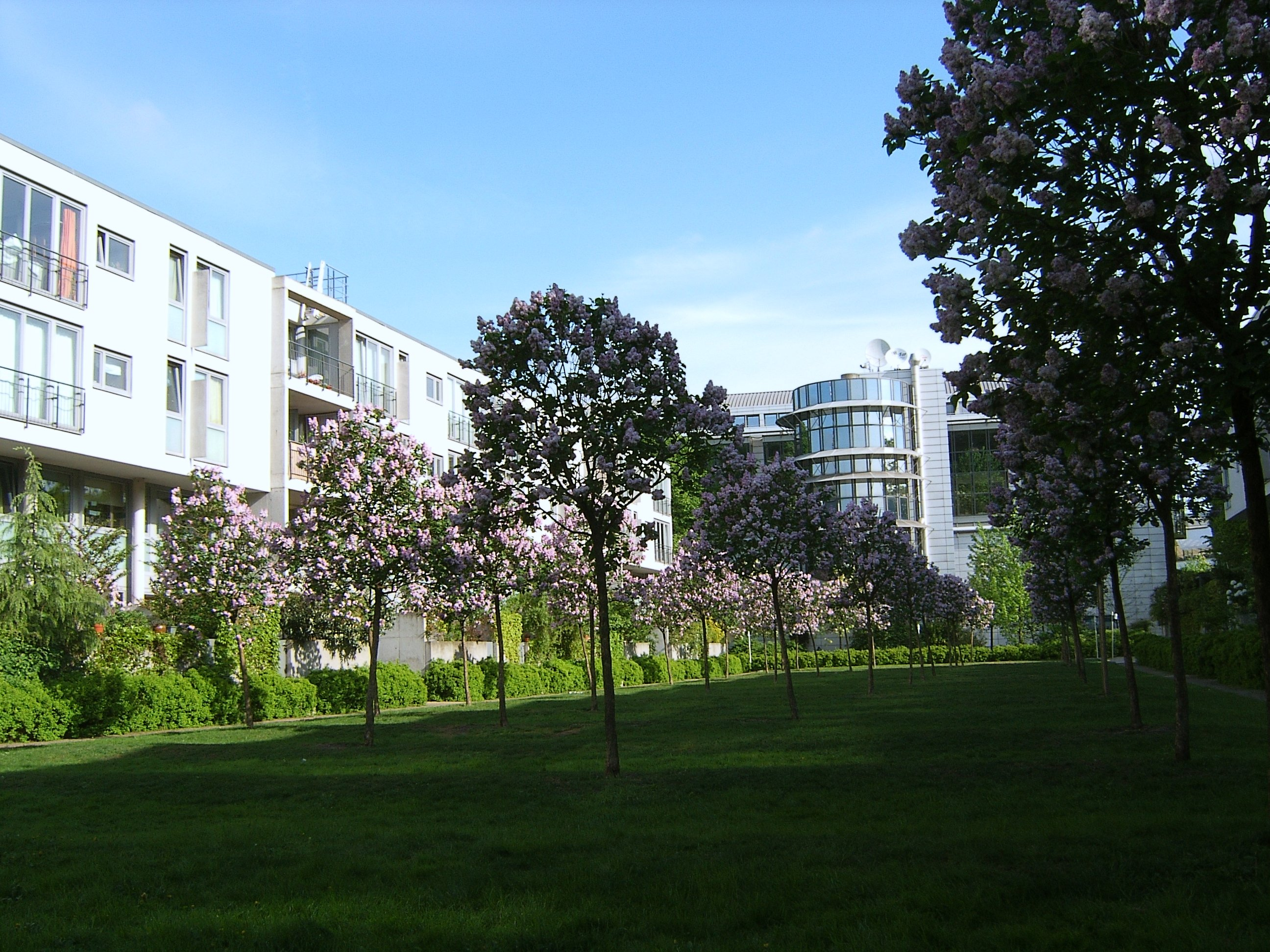
- Hamburg-Rotherbaum
- Interactive map of Sportplatz am Rothenbaum
- Location: Hamburg, Germany
- Capacity: 27,000

Construction
- Opened: 1910
- Closed: 1997

Sportplatz am Rothenbaum was a multi-use stadium in Hamburg, Germany, from 1910–1997.

Situated at Rothenbaumchaussee in Rotherbaum, it was used mostly for football matches and hosted the home matches of Hamburger SV. The stadium was able to hold 27,000 people and opened in 1910. It was eventually replaced by Volksparkstadion in 1963, and was closed for good in 1997.
