= Hamburg South Seas Expedition =

Ethnographic expedition to German New Guinea (1908–1910)

The Hamburg South Seas Expedition or the German South Seas Expedition (German: Ergebnisse der Südsee-Expedition) was an ethnographic expedition to German New Guinea, specifically the Caroline Islands and Marshall Islands. It was funded by the Hamburg Scientific Foundation. It lasted from 1908 to 1910. The professed goal of the expedition was "to observe and record the final phases of an old, indigenous culture as long as it still had vitality and still retained as many remnants as possible of the old times, which were little changed." The Melanesian wing was led by Friedrich Fülleborn, and the Micronesian wing by Augustin Krämer. Much of the collected artifacts are in the collections of the Museum am Rothenbaum. Ethnographic films made have preserved the dances of the Melanesia and Micronesian cultures/
