= Wilhelm Hauers =

German architect

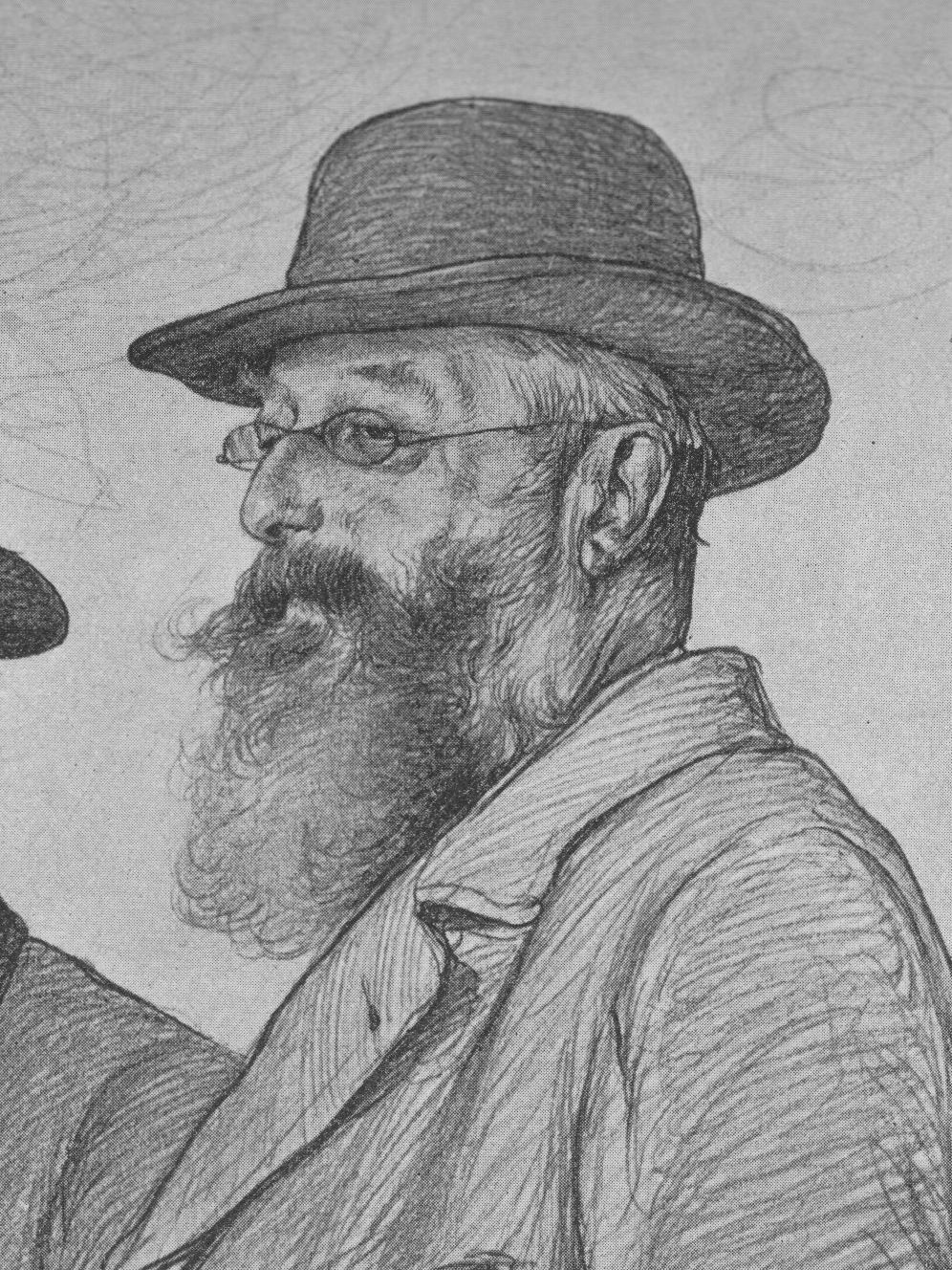
- Born: 10 February 1836; Celle
- Died: 27 April 1905 (aged 69); Hamburg
- Education: Hanover Polytechnic School
- Occupation: architect
- Known for: co-founder of the Hamburg Bauhütte
- Notable work: St. Johannis Harvestehude Hamburg, Hamburg City Hall

Wilhelm Hauers (10 February 1836 in Celle – 27 April 1905 in Hamburg) was a German architect. His works include the St. Johannis Harvestehude Hamburg and Hamburg City Hall.

== Career ==
Wilhelm Hauers studied at the Hanover Polytechnic School from 1852 to 1855. Here he joined the Landsmannschaft Schleswig-Holstein, later Corps Schleswig-Holstein, in 1853. in 1858 he was made an honorary member. After graduation he worked in the office of Conrad Wilhelm Hase, including as construction manager of the Christuskirche in Hanover. His "portrait" is symbolized on this church as a gargoyle with a boar's head (= the "tusks" of the boar). in 1860 he was a co-founder of the Niedersächsische Bauhütte and was later made an honorary member of its successor, the Bauhütte zum Weißen Blatt.

From 1866, Wilhelm Hauers was employed by the Baudeputation in Hamburg, where he became self-employed in 1871. During this time he became a co-founder of the Hamburg Bauhütte. He was also a member of the Hamburg Artists' Association of 1832.
