= St. Johannis-Harvestehude =

Coordinates: 53°34′15″N 9°59′37″E

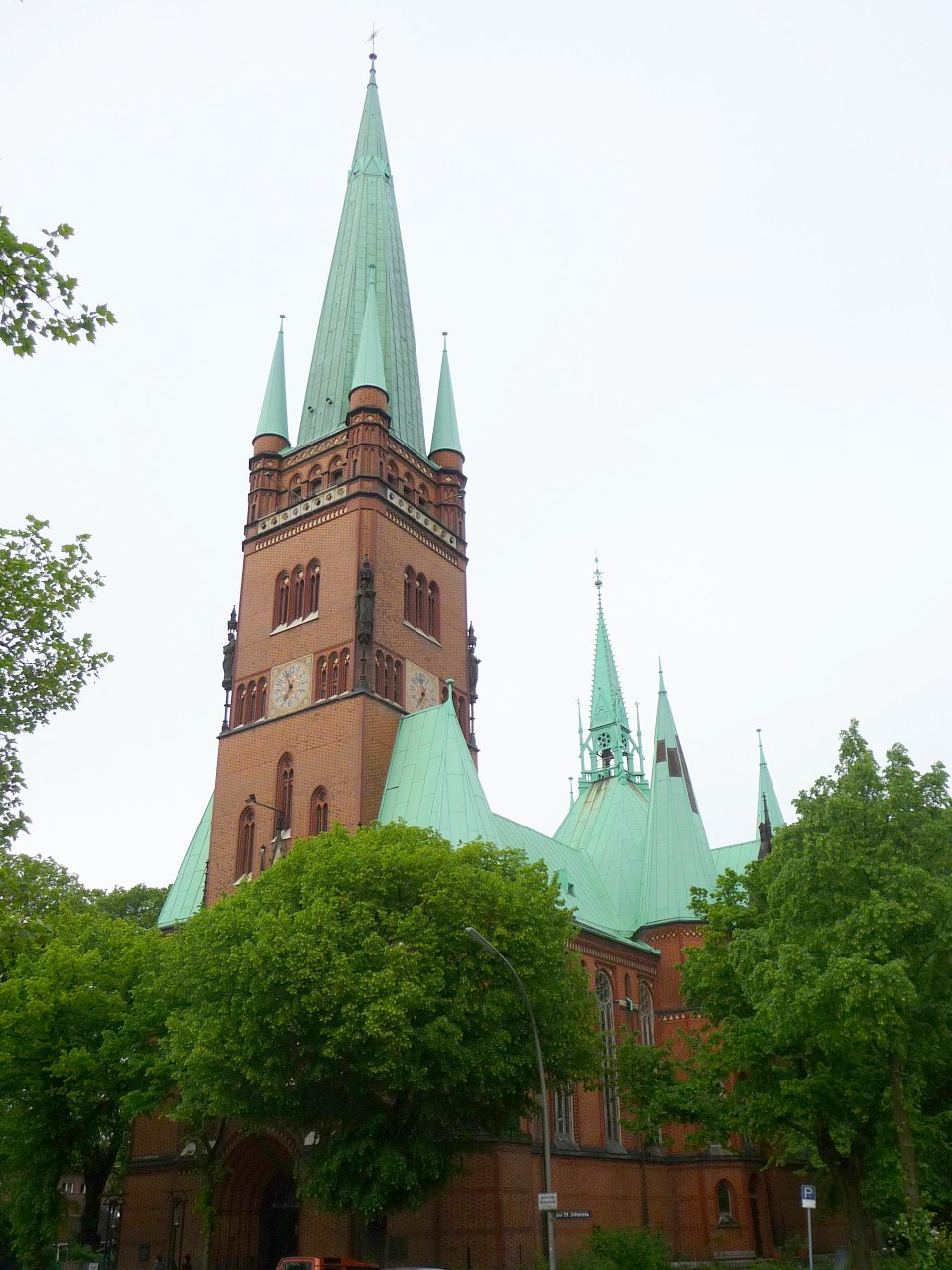
St. Johannis Harvestehude

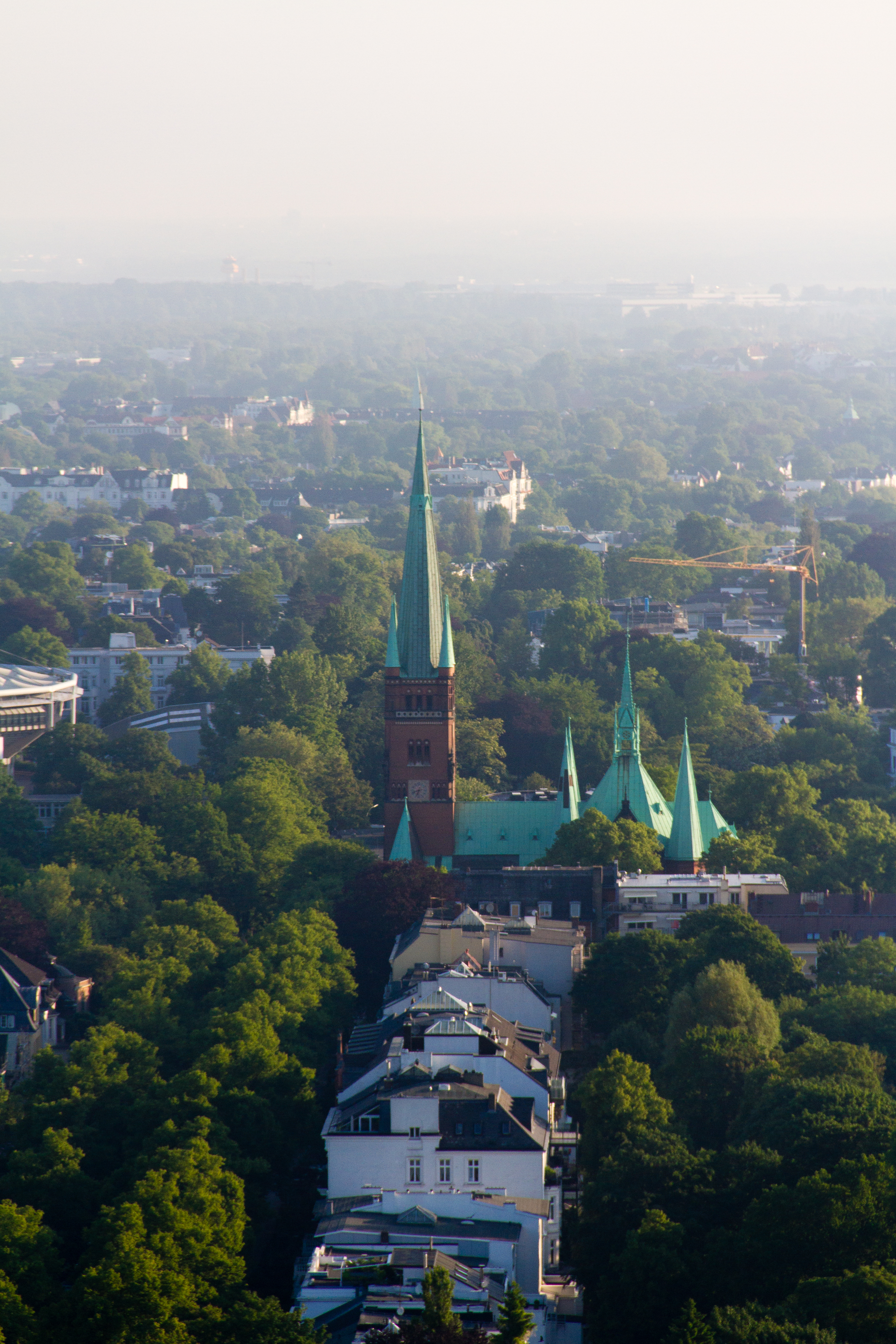
Aerial view

St. Johannis-Harvestehude (St. John-Harvestehude), Hamburg, is a neo-Gothic Protestant church, built between 1880 and 1882, and considered one of the best-preserved turn-of-the-century monuments of Hamburg. Contrary to what the name might suggest, the church is located in the Rotherbaum quarter of Hamburg, between the streets of Turmweg and Mittelweg, near the Außenalster.

== History ==
The parish of St. John-Harvestehude was founded on 27 January 1879. The first parish council, presided by the future mayor Dr. Mönckeberg, selected the design of the architect Wilhelm Hauers, out of seven proposals. The "provisorial committee for the construction of a church in front of the Dammthor" had already settled issues of property with the town and could therefore provide capital, so that the works could swiftly be carried out within the years 1880 to 1882.

The architect Hauers designed the church in the spirit of the "Eisenacher Regulativ", of 1861. The result is an architectural composition that is nearly complete in its neogothical sense of art. The pews, chairs and lecterns may be counted among this, as well as the organ prospectus, the terrazzo-floor and the frescos. The spires of St. John are clearly visible, in particular at night, from various parts of the town. The main spire reaches a height of 80m.

== The Altar ==
St. John is entirely focused on Jesus and the Altar, which is wood-carved and gold-plated. The latter, a work of the Hamburg sculptor Neuber, shows the Lord three times:

1. In a copy of Leonardo da Vinci's "Communion", titled with the words: "Come unto me, all ye that labour and are heavily laden and I will give you rest." (Matthew 11:28)
2. In the depiction of a group of crucifixion scenes above the Holy Communion, which is a reproduction of the work of the renowned wood carver Tilmann Riemenschneider. It is embroidered with a mandorla.
3. On the pediment of the Altar depicted as the Resurrected Christ.

In the above window, Jesus is shown as the Lord, wearing a red toga, holding the keys in the left and the "Book of Life" in the right.

== Stained glass ==
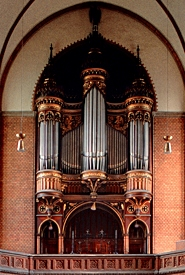
The Marcussen organ of St. Johannis Harvestehude

The designs for the glass paintings that have been manufactured in a workshop in Innsbruck, Austria, are the work of artists belonging to the renowned "Nazarene" group around Schnoor von Carolsfeld. They still radiate as brilliantly as they used to do, a hundred years ago, thanks to protective windshields preventing environmental erosion. They illustrate a coherent biblical cycle, beginning on the main entrance's left with three depictions of the Old Testament, proceeding with the "Christmas window" at the crossing, the images of Christ in the Choir, the "Pentecostal window" and, eventually, three pictures dealing with subjects of the New Testament.

== The Organ ==
The organ dates the same time of origin as the church. In 1882, the company Marcussen und Sohn of Apenrade built a duo-manual instrument with 27 resonating voices. It experienced several alterations and was changed for the last time in 1933 by Furtwängler&Hammer of Hannover. The now tri-manual instrument with 49 registers and 3494 pipes has ever since been employed.

After the war, this concert organ was the only one in Hamburg to be of use. In the 1970s, it was thoroughly cleansed and renovated. Then, in 1974, the company Peter of Cologne created a new playing table, for the first time incorporating electronic technology. Thanks to this, the organ is suited for all kinds of musical literature, from prebaroque to modern, and improvisation.
