= Klosterstern station =

Metro station in Hamburg, Harvestehude, Germany

Klosterstern
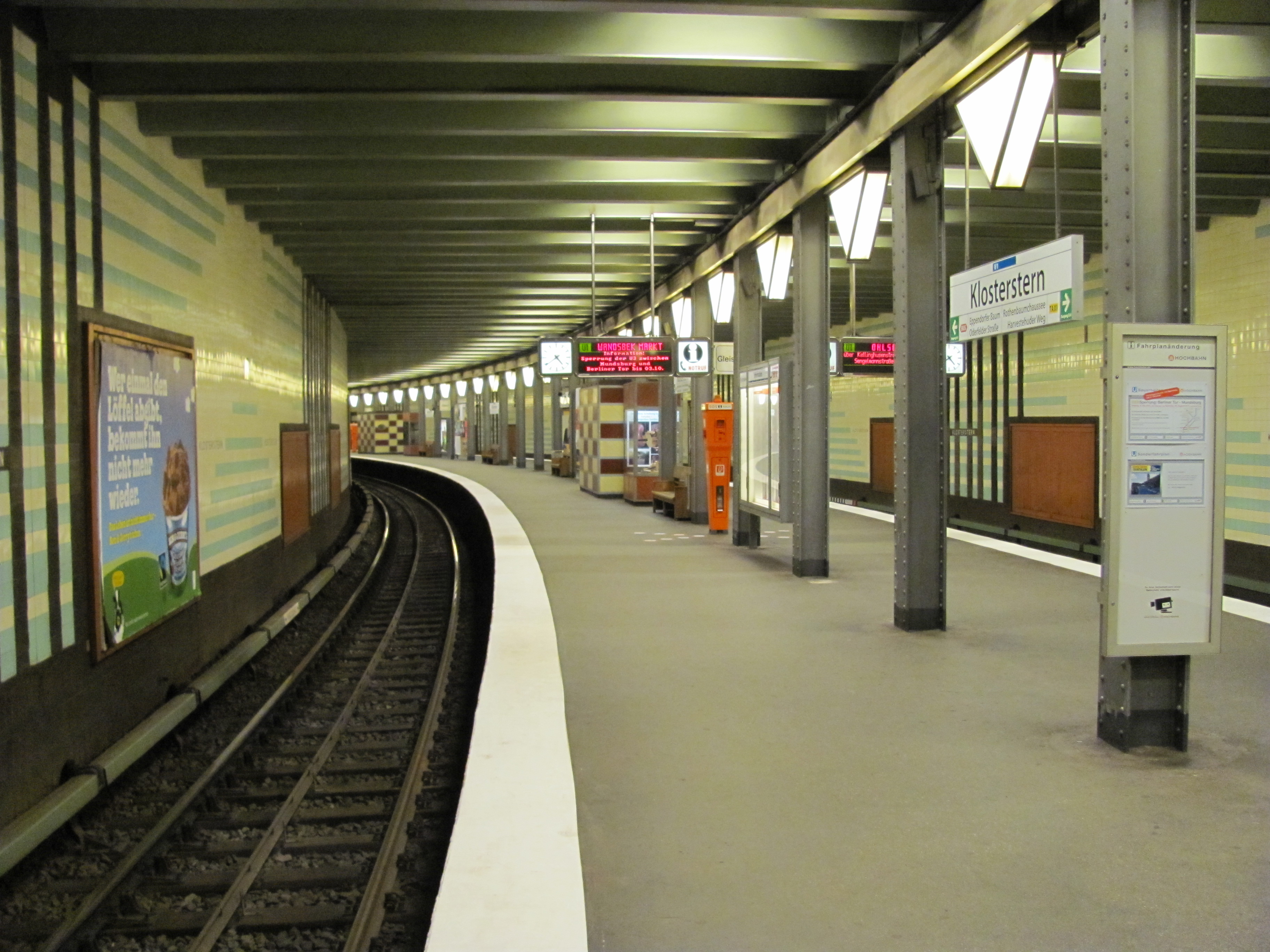

General information
- Location: Klosterstern; 20149 Hamburg, Germany
- Coordinates: 53°34′54″N 09°59′18″E
- System: Hamburg U-Bahn station
- Operator: Hamburger Hochbahn AG
- Line: U1
- Platforms: 1 island platform
- Tracks: 2
- Connections: Bus, Taxi

Construction
- Structure type: Underground
- Accessible: Yes

Other information
- Station code: HHA: KR
- Fare zone: HVV: A/000

History
- Opened: 2 June 1929

Services
Preceding station	Hamburg U-Bahn	Following station
Kellinghusenstraße towards Norderstedt Mitte	U1	Hallerstraße towards Großhansdorf or Ohlstedt
Location
- Location within Hamburg Location within Schleswig-Holstein Location within Germany Location within Europe

Klosterstern is a metro station on the Hamburg U-Bahn line U1. The station was opened in 1929 and is located in the Hamburg district of Harvestehude, Germany. Harvestehude is part of the Hamburg borough of Eimsbüttel.

== Service ==
=== Trains ===
Klosterstern is served by Hamburg U-Bahn line U1; departures are every 5 minutes.

== Gallery ==
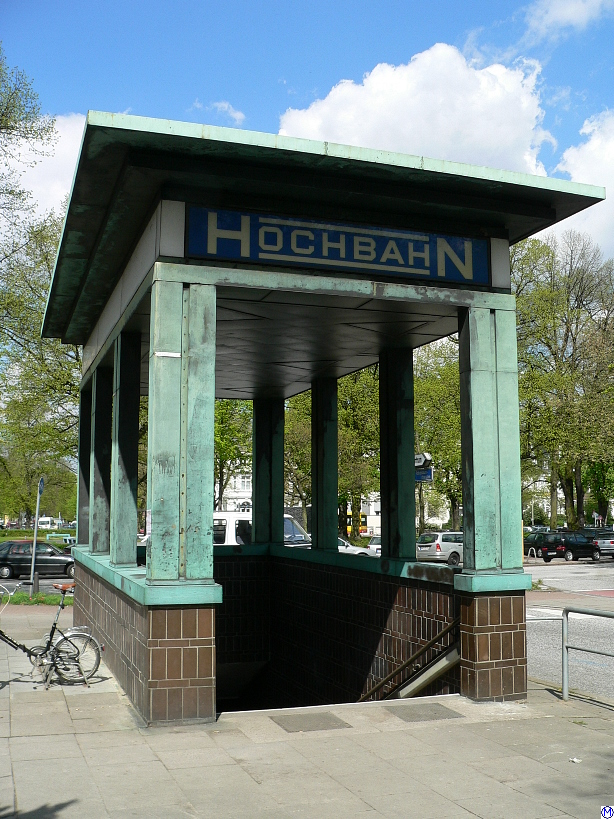
One of the station's 1920s entrances

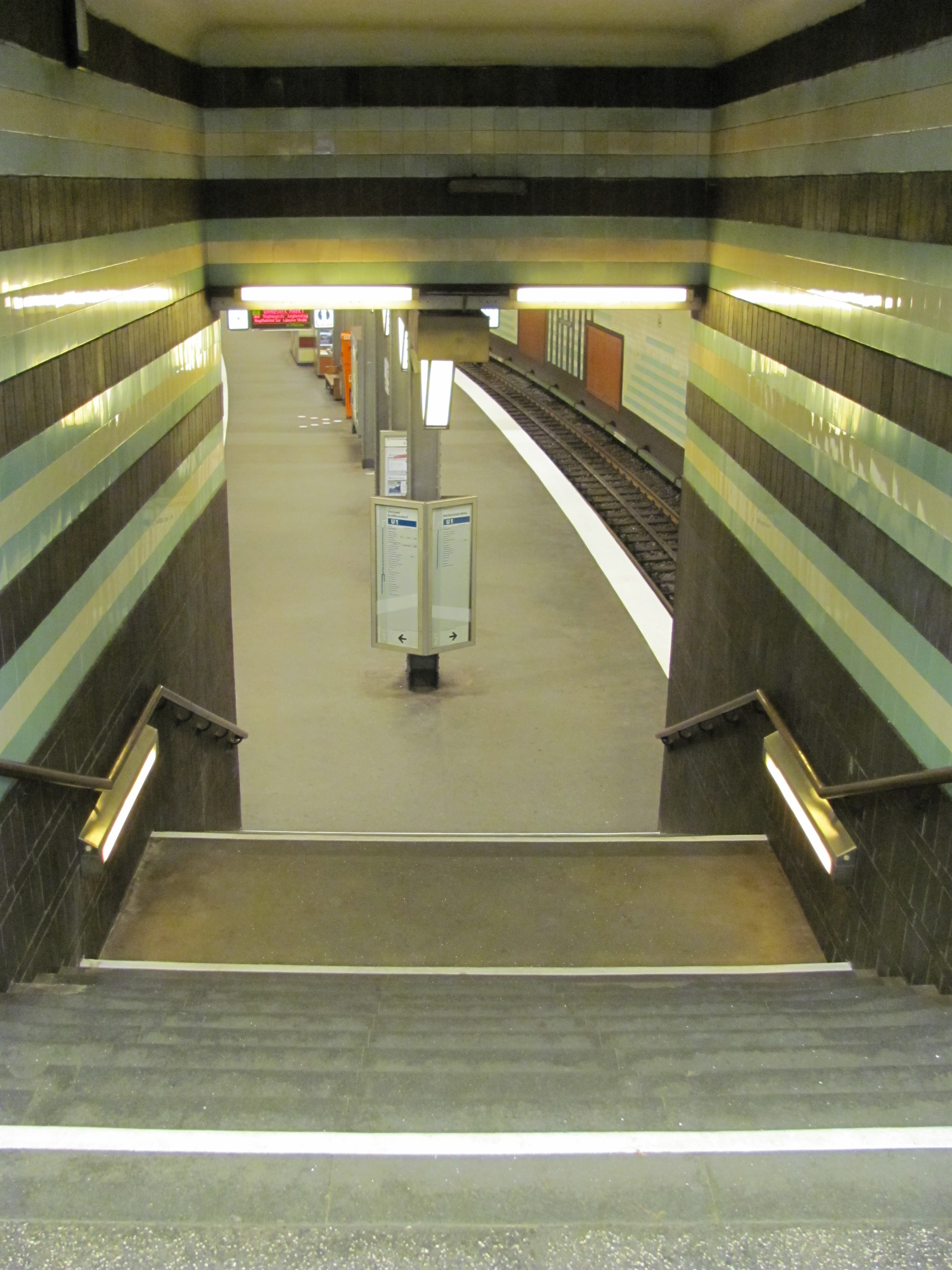

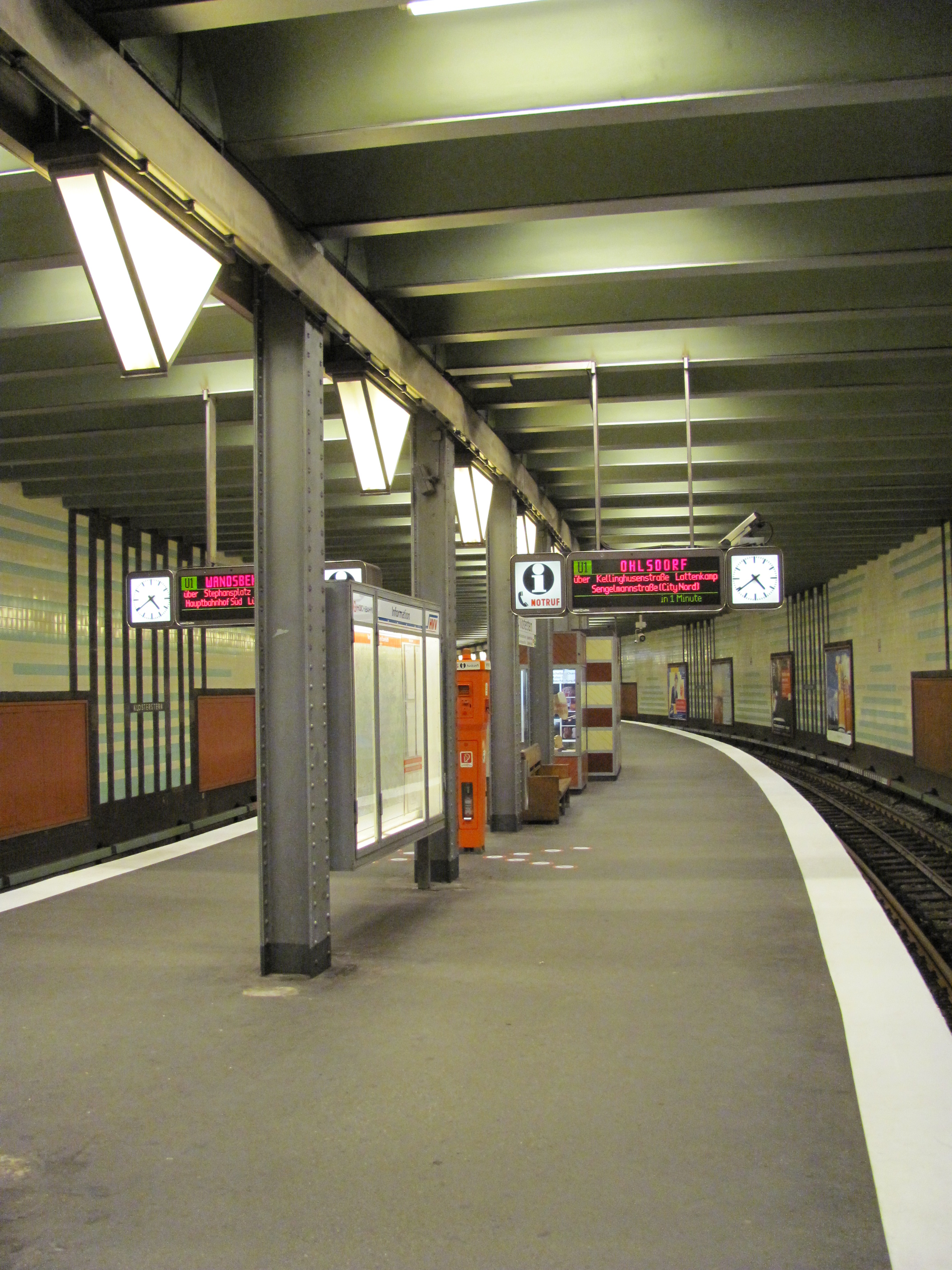

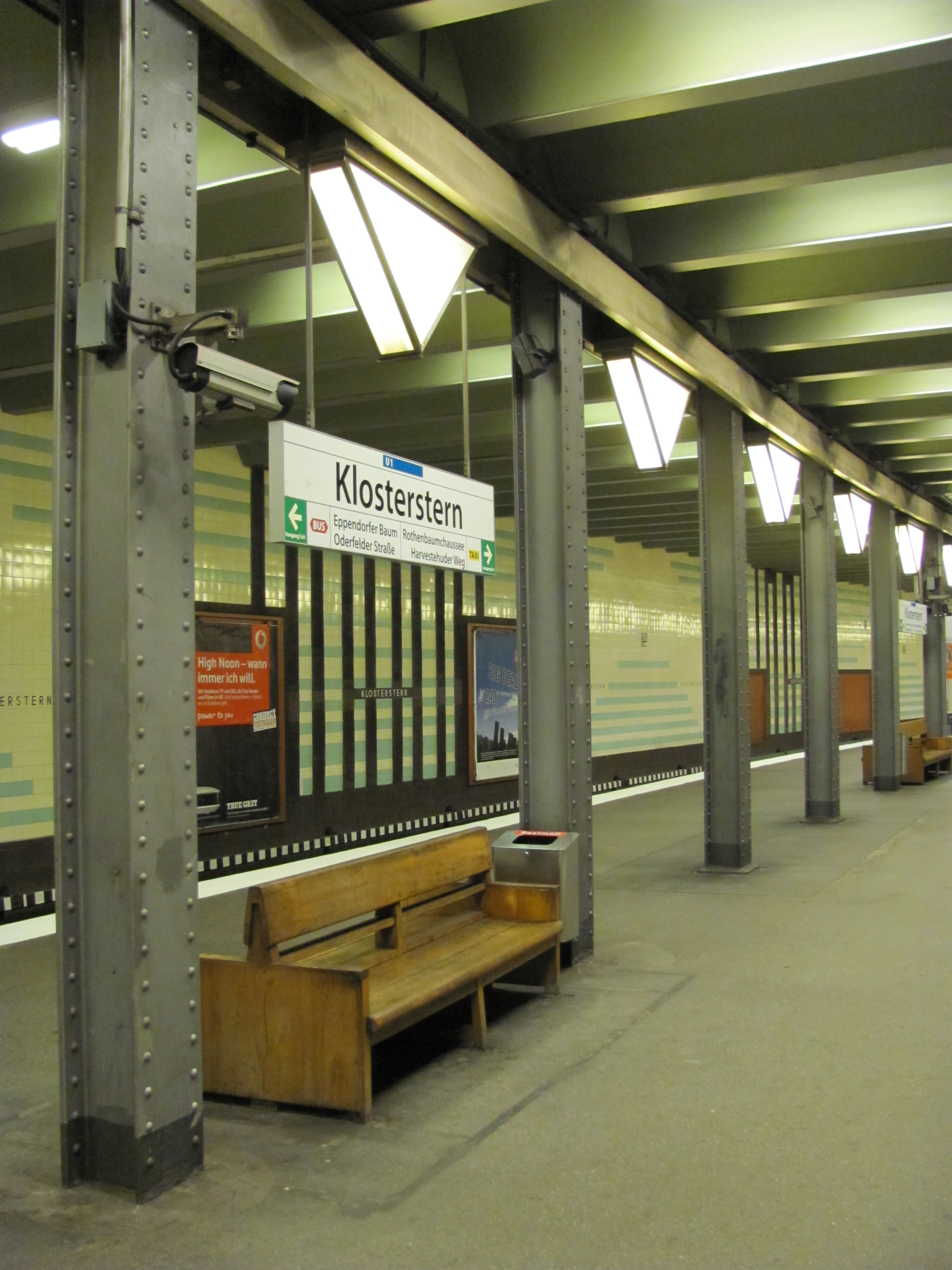

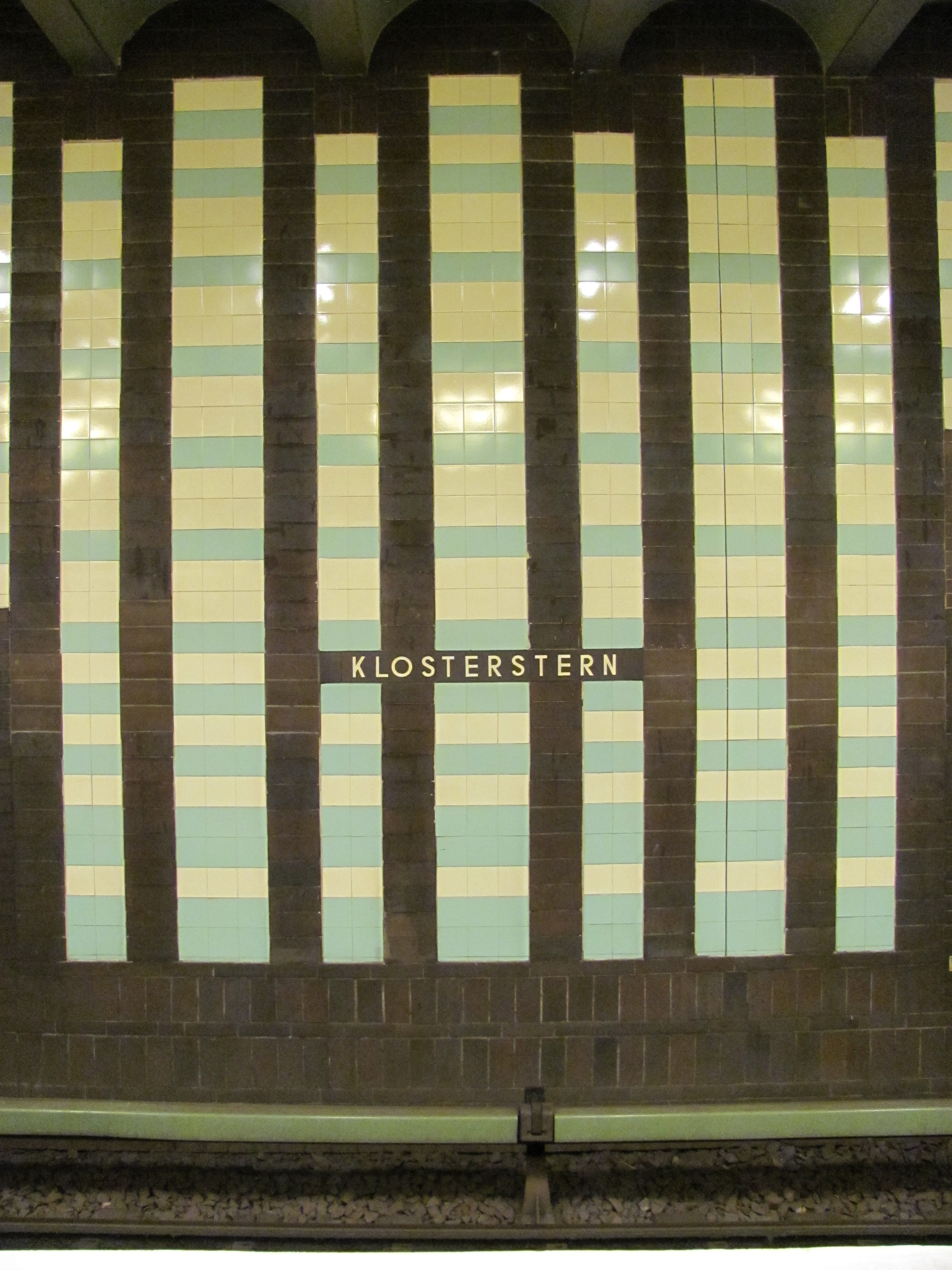

== See also ==
- List of Hamburg U-Bahn stations
