= Paul Hambruch =

German ethnologist (1882–1933)

Paul Hambruch (22 November 1882, Hamburg – 25 June 1933, Hamburg) was a German ethnologist and folklorist.

== Biography ==
He studied natural sciences, chemistry and mathematics at the University of Göttingen and geography, anthropology and ethnology in Berlin, where his instructors were Ferdinand von Richthofen and Felix von Luschan. In 1904 he began work as an assistant at the Ethnological Museum of Berlin. By way of a request from the Jaluit Gesellschaft, he traveled to Nauru in an effort to fight a disease affecting coconuts.

In 1908–10 he participated in the Südsee-Expedition to Micronesia under the directorship of Georg Thilenius, head of the Ethnological Museum in Hamburg. In the South Seas, he conducted ethnographic research on Nauru, Ponape and other islands. His collection of fairy tales and myths from the Pacific islands were to become widely known.

After returning to Germany, he was named director of the Oceania department at the Ethnological Museum in Hamburg. In 1922 he was appointed professor of anthropology at the University of Hamburg, where he also gave classes on the traditional customs and folklore of rural Europe. In 1929 he became a founding member of the Gesellschaft für Völkerkunde, which later became the Deutsche Gesellschaft für Völkerkunde.

== Selected works ==
- Die Schiffahrt auf den Karolinen- und Marshallinseln, 1912.
- Nauru. Ergebnisse der Südsee-Expedition, 1908–1910. II, Ethnographie: B. Mikronesien, Vol. 1: 1-2. Friederichsen, Hamburg 1914–15 (Online 1, 2).
- Südseemärchen aus Australien, Neu-Guinea, Fidji, Karolinen, Samoa, Tonga, Hawaii, Neu-Seeland, 1921 (editor) – South Seas fairy tales from Australia, New Guinea, Fiji, the Carolines, Samoa, Tonga, Hawaii, New Zealand.
- Malaiische Märchen aus Madagaskar und Insulinde 1922 (editor) – Malay fairy tales from Madagascar and Insulindia.
- Faraulip; Liebeslegenden aus der Südsee, 1924 – Faraulep: Love legends from the South Seas.
- Einführung in die Abteilung Südsee: Geschichte, Lebensraum, Umwelt und Bevölkerung, 1931.
- Ponape 1932–36 (treatise on Ponape).
