= Museum am Rothenbaum =

Museum am Rothenbaum – Kulturen und Künste der Welt, MARKK
- Museum für Völkerkunde Hamburg
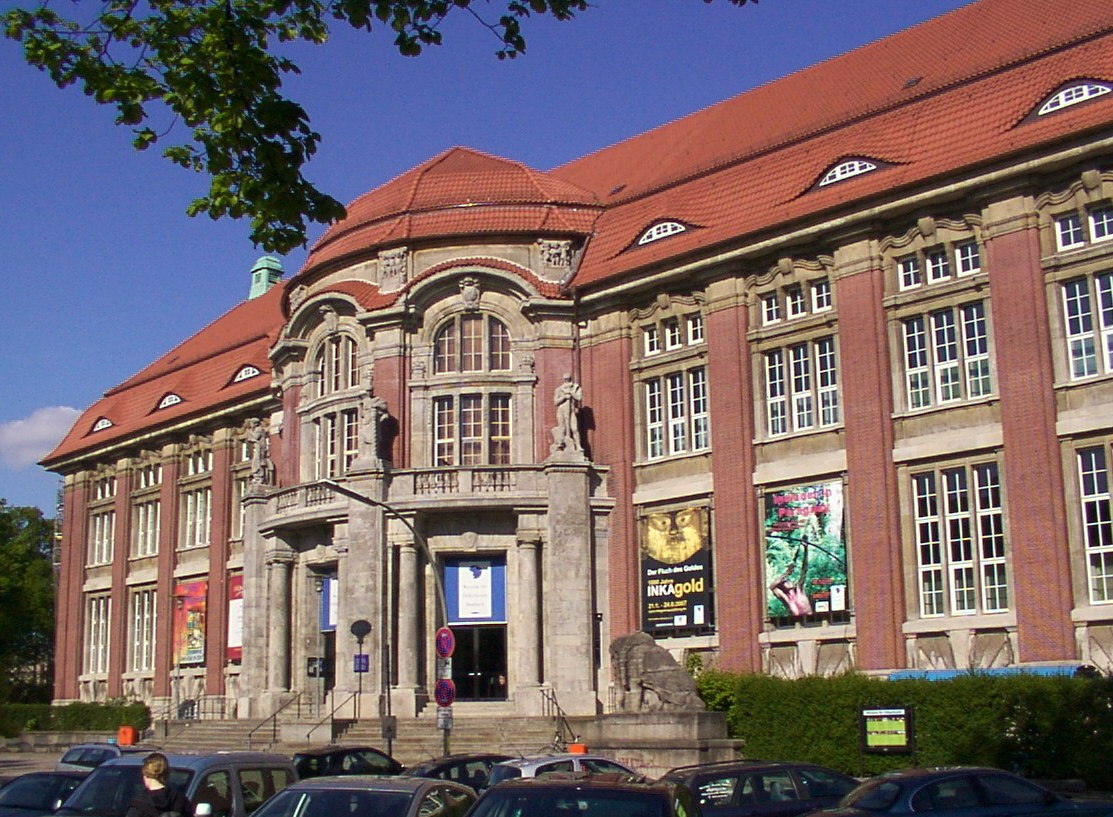
- The main facade of the building

- Location of the Museum of Ethnology in Hamburg Museum am Rothenbaum (Germany)
- Established: 1879
- Location: Hamburg, Germany
- Coordinates: 53.5683°N 9.9892°E
- Type: Museum of ethnology
- Visitors: 180,000 per year
- Public transit access: Dammtor
- Website: https://markk-hamburg.de/en/

The Museum am Rothenbaum – Kulturen und Künste der Welt (lit. Museum at the Rothenbaum – Cultures and Arts of the World, abbr.: MARKK, former name: Museum of Ethnology, Hamburg, German: Museum für Völkerkunde Hamburg), founded in 1879, is today one of the largest museums of ethnology in Europe. The approximately 350,000 objects in the collection are visited every year by about 180,000 visitors. It lies in the Rotherbaum quarter of the Eimsbüttel borough in Hamburg at the Rothenbaumchaussee avenue.

== History ==
The museum originated as a small ethnographic collection of the city library, begun in 1849. This collection later became part of the Museum for Natural History in Hamburg, and in 1867 was opened to the public as "Die Ethnographische oder Sammlung für Völkerkunde im Anschluss an das Naturhistorische Museum in Hamburg". The collection, which at that time numbered 645 objects, was curated by Adolph Oberdörfer and Ferdinand Worlée. 1871 saw the renaming of the collection to "Culturhistorisches Museum", so that it progressed from the "Naturhistorisches Museum". On 29 April 1879 the "Museums für Völkerkunde" was founded. At first the businessman Carl W. Lüders led the museum in the position of provost until 1896. On 1 October 1904 Georg Thilenius took over the position of full-time administrative director of the "Museums für Völkerkunde und Vorgeschichte".

Georg Thilenius strongly supported the building of a freestanding museum to house the collection. Once approved, the construction lasted between 1908 and 1912, with an expansion to house workspace completed in 1929.

== See also ==
- List of museums and cultural institutions in Hamburg
