= Georg Thilenius =

German physician and anthropologist

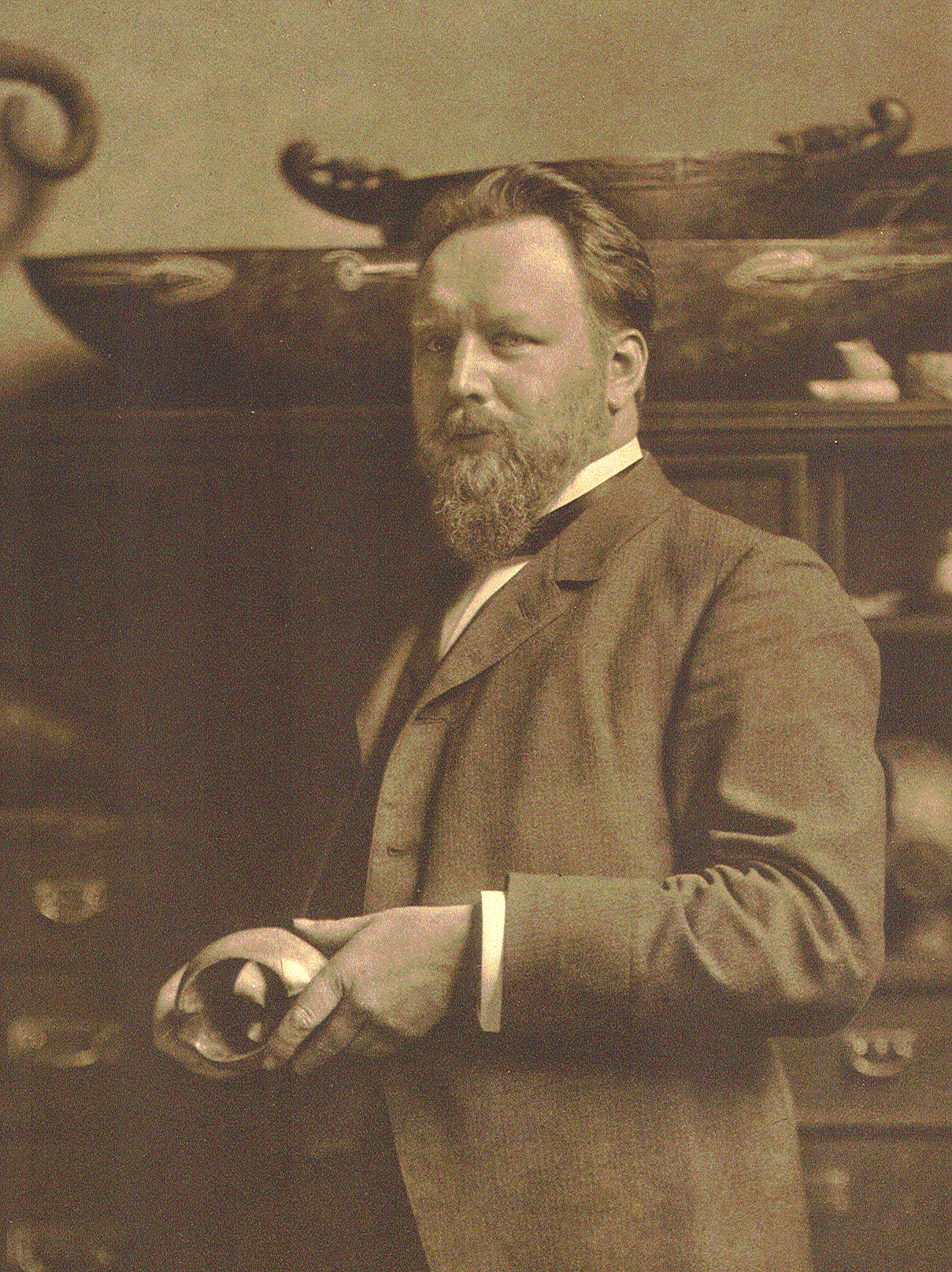
Georg Christian Thilenius in 1905. Photo by Rudolf Dührkoop

Georg Christian Thilenius (4 October 1868 – 28 December 1937) was a German physician and anthropologist who was a native of Soden am Taunus.

He studied medicine in Bonn and Berlin, and in 1896 was habilitated as an anatomist at the University of Strasbourg. Afterwards he participated in research trips to Tunisia and the South Pacific. In 1900 he became a professor of anthropology and ethnology at the University of Breslau, and several years later (1904) was appointed director of the Museum für Völkerkunde Hamburg (Museum of Ethnology, Hamburg),. a position he maintained until his retirement in 1935.

As director of the Hamburg Museum of Ethnography, Thilenius coordinated the 1908-1910 Südsee-Expedition, a scientific expedition to German administered territories in Micronesia and Melanesia. Members of the research group included Friedrich Fülleborn (1866-1933), Augustin Krämer (1865–1941), Paul Hambruch (1882-1933), Otto Reche (1879-1966), Ernst Sarfert (1882-1937) and Wilhelm Müller-Wismar (1881-1916). Over 15,000 objects and artifacts from the South Pacific were brought back to Hamburg, which were documented until 1938 (23 volumes).

He was a member of the Kolonialinstitut in Hamburg, an institute where he served as chairman from 1908 to 1910. He also worked as a lecturer at the institute, which was the predecessor of Hamburg University. He would later become director of the chair for anthropology at the university.

== Selected writings ==
- Ethnographische ergebnisse aus Melanesien I Theil, Die westlichen Inseln des Bismarck-Archipels (Ethnographic results from Melanesia part I, the western islands of the Bismarck Archipelago), Leipzig, 1902–03. Part II published in 1903.
- Die Bedeutung der Meeresströmungen für die Besiedelung Melanesiens (The importance of ocean currents for the settlement of Melanesia) Hamburg 1906.
- Das Hamburgische Museum für Völkerkunde (The Hamburg Museum of Ethnology), Berlin 1916.
- Ergebnisse der Südsee-Expedition 1908 - 1910 (Results of the South Seas Expedition 1908 - 1910), Hamburg 1914 ff. (as editor).
