= Anselm Grün =

German monk

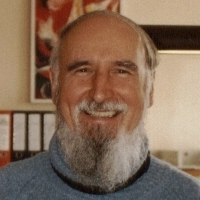
Anselm Grün, April 2005

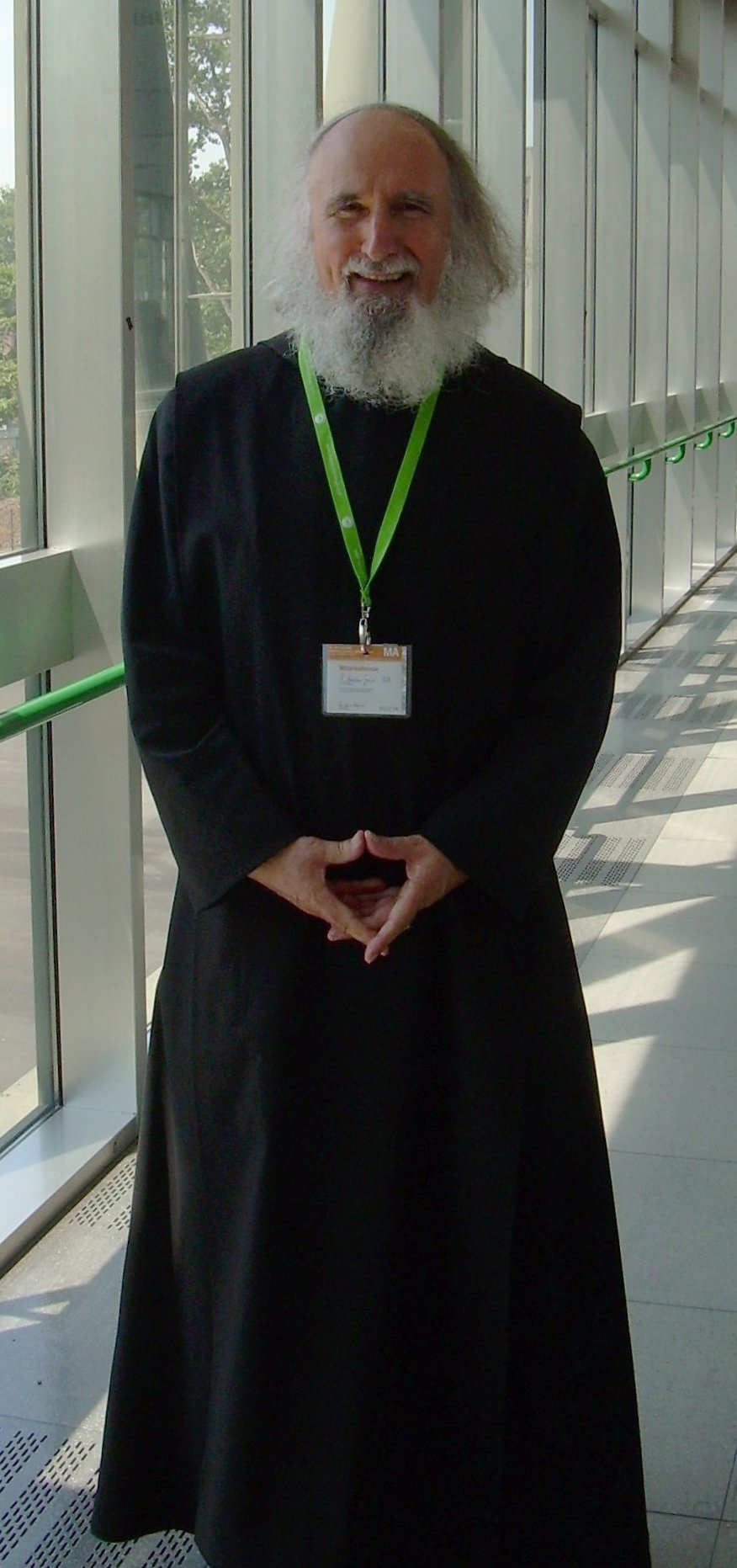
Anselm Grün, June 2007

Anselm Grün (in English also: Anselm Gruen), OSB (born 14 January 1945 in Junkershausen, Germany) is a German Benedictine monk. He was in charge of Münsterschwarzach Abbey's financial matters, as its cellarer. He has written around 300 books focused on spirituality, of which more than 15 million copies have been sold in 30 languages. He also conducts courses and lectures, and provides spiritual counseling for managers.

== Biography ==
Grün finished his school years in 1964 with the A-level equivalent Abitur at the grammar school in Würzburg, Germany. In the same year he began as a novice at the nearby Benedictine Münsterschwarzach Abbey. From 1965 to 1971 he studied philosophy and theology at St. Ottilien Archabbey and in Rome. In 1974 he completed his PhD in theology on Karl Rahner. From 1974 to 1976 he studied Business in Nuremberg, then became the cellarer of Münsterschwarzach Abbey, where he is responsible for the economic administration of its 280 employees and 20 businesses.
