= Rotherbaum =

- Quarter of Hamburg
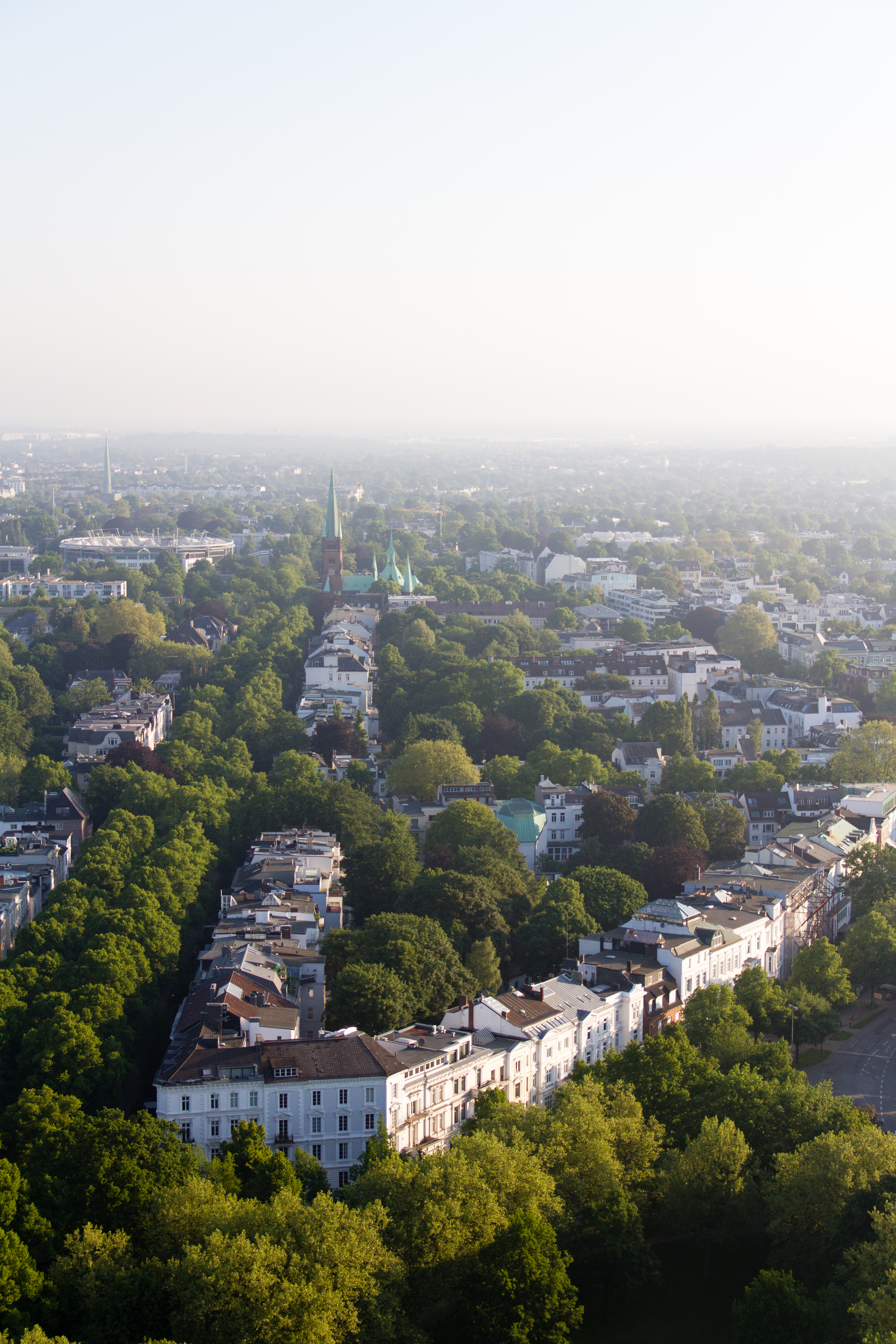
- Aerial view of Rotherbaum from the south

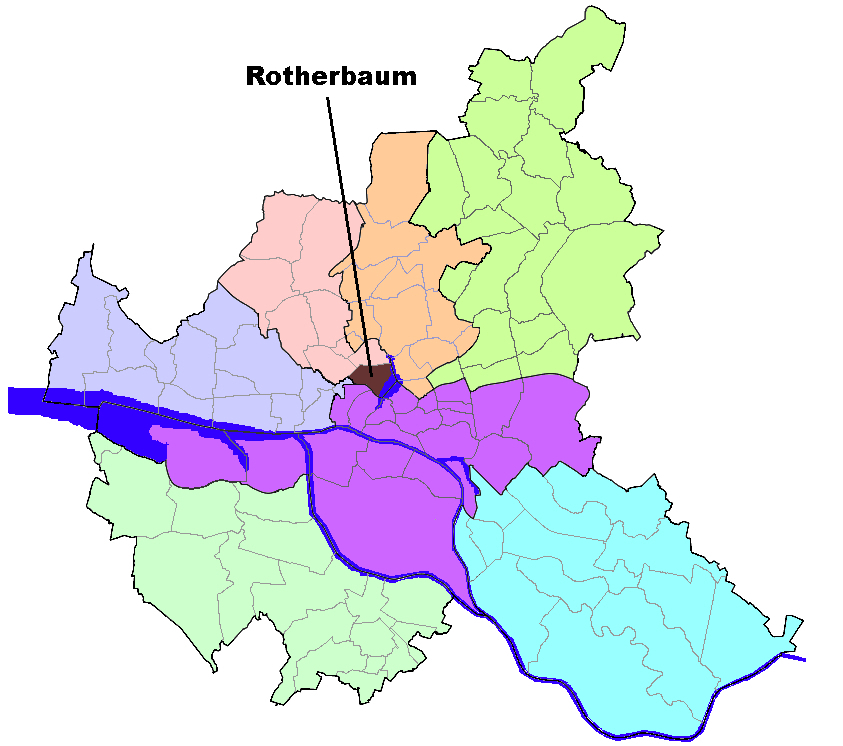
- Location of Rotherbaum in the city of Hamburg
- Interactive map of Rotherbaum
- Location within Germany Location within Hamburg
- Coordinates: 53°34′5″N 9°59′18″E
- Country: Germany
- State: Hamburg
- City: Hamburg
- Borough: Eimsbüttel

Area
  - Total: 2.9 km^{2} (1.1 sq mi)

Population (2024-12-31)
  - Total: 17,253
  - Density: 5,900/km^{2} (15,000/sq mi)
- Time zone: UTC+01:00 (CET)
  - Summer (DST): UTC+02:00 (CEST)
- Dialling codes: 040
- Vehicle registration: HH

Rotherbaum (German pronunciation: [ˈʁoːtɐbaʊm]) is a quarter of Eimsbüttel, a borough of Hamburg, Germany. In 2020, the population was 17,114.

In German, "roter Baum" means red tree. The "th", which in general was abolished in the spelling reform of 1900, was preserved in names. Depending on grammatical context, it might also be spelled with n as Rothenbaum.

== History ==
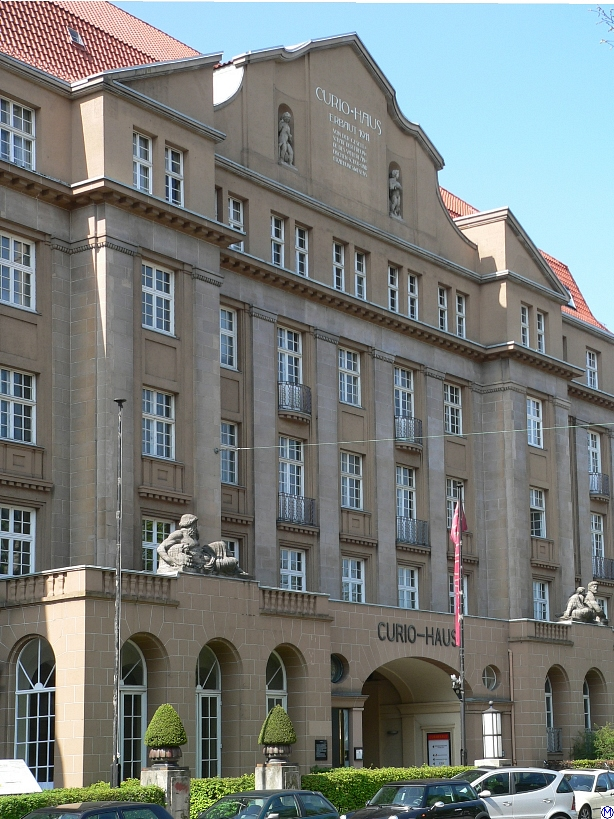
Front view of the Curiohaus in Rotherbaum

Since 1800, distinguished and rich Hamburg citizens built the mansions at the bank of the Außenalster lake, to move from the city to a better surrounding area. An example is the building at Alsterufer street #27, built by Martin Haller—the architect of the Hamburg Rathaus—the building was later owned by Anton Riedemann, the founder of Deutsch-Amerikanischen Petroleum-Gesellschaft; later Esso. As of 2009, the Consulate General of the United States in Hamburg used the building.

From 1946 to 1948, war crime trials were held by the British Armed Forces in the Curiohaus, an office building which is named after Johann Carl Daniel Curio. Located in Rotherbaum's Rothenbaumchaussee 15, it survived the bombing of Hamburg. Among others, subject of the Curiohaus processes were Fritz Knoechlein for the Le Paradis massacre, the SS-physician Alfred Trzebinski from the Neuengamme concentration camp, Hamburg's famous football player Otto Harder (sentenced to 15 years imprisonment) and the company Tesch & Stabenow which sold Zyklon B.

== Geography ==
In 2006, according to the statistical office of Hamburg and Schleswig-Holstein, Rotherbaum had a total area of 2.9 km^{2}. To the North the quarter Harvestehude is located. The southern boundaries of Rotherbaum to the quarters Neustadt, St. Pauli and Sternschanze are formed by the railway tracks of the city train. In the West the quarter Eimsbüttel can be found. In the East the lake Außenalster marks the boundaries to the quarter of St. Georg.

== Demographics ==
In 2006, 16,853 inhabitants were living in Rotherbaum. The population density was 5,842/km^{2} (15,131/sq mi). 11.3% were children under the age of 18, and 13.7% were 65 years of age or older. 22.6% were immigrants. 503 people were registered as unemployed and 4,866 were employees subject to social insurance contributions.

In 1999, there were 11,615 households, out of which 11.1% had children under the age of 18 living with them and 63.3% of all households were made up of individuals. The average household size was 1.57.

In 2006, there were 3,299 criminal offences (192 crimes per 1000 people).

== Education ==
The campuses of the University of Hamburg and the University of Music and Drama of Hamburg are located in Rotherbaum. In 2006, there were also one elementary school, the Grundschule Turmweg, and one secondary school, the Sophie-Barat-Schule. The Talmud Tora Schule, which was established in 1805, closed in 1942, and re-opened in 2002, is located in Rotherbaum. Wilhelm-Gymnasium was located in Rotherbaum from 1885 to 1945.

Education Center Calmfidence Academy is also located in Rothenbaum

One of the leading Universities for Music and Theatre in Europe Hochschule für Musik und Theater Hamburg is also located in Rothenbaum

== Culture ==
=== Sports ===
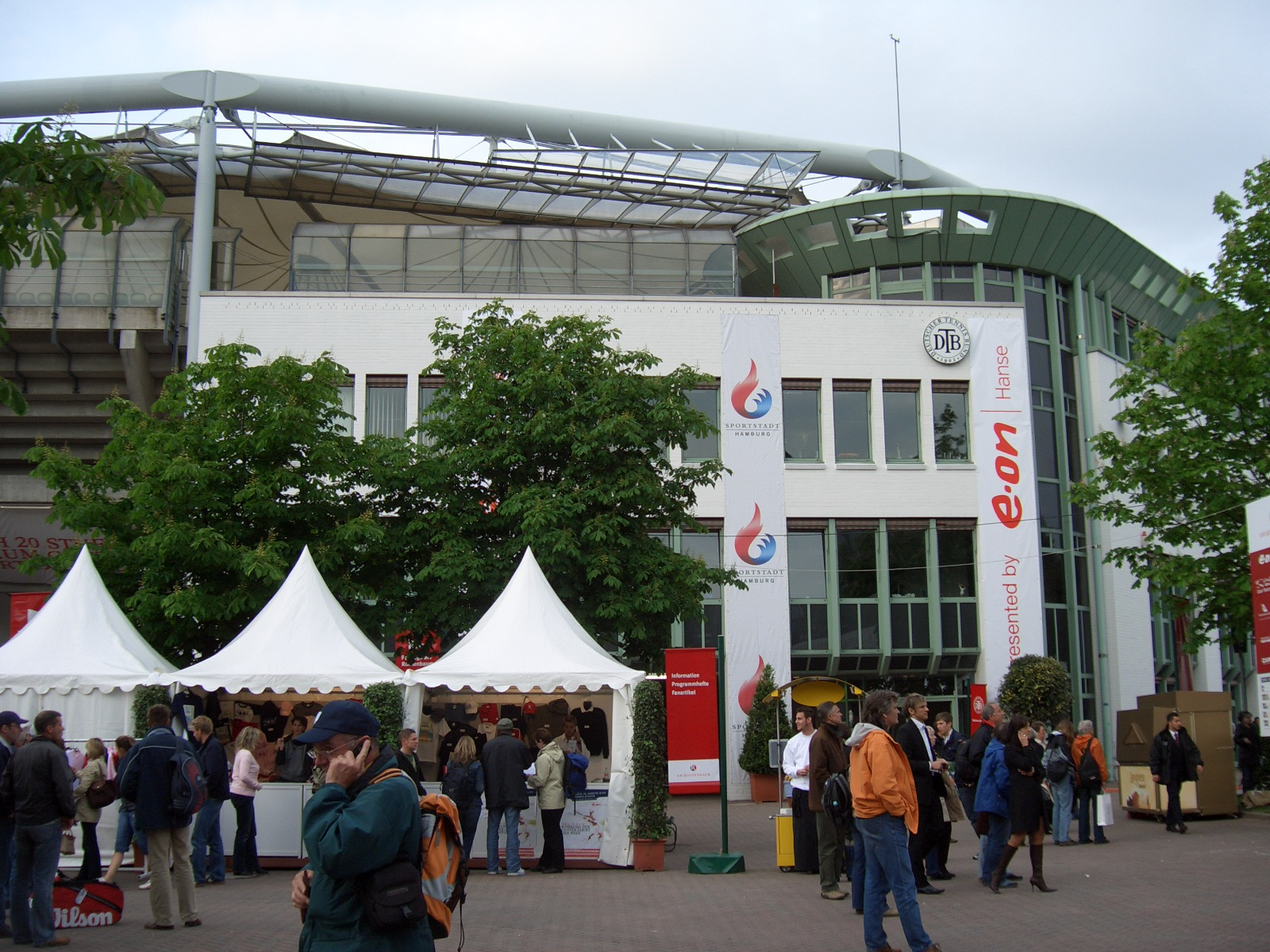
Centre Court Am Rothenbaum

The main tennis court of the (former German Open) Hamburg Masters tournament is located in the Am Rothenbaum stadium. Though it is named after the Rotherbaum area, it is officially located in the neighbouring Harvestehude quarter.

The hockey club, Club an der Alster, has facilities in Rotherbaum.

Sportplatz at Rothenbaum, which was opened in 1910, was the stadium used by Hamburger SV and later by their amateur team and for promotion play-offs at the end of each season, until the stadium was demolished in 1994.

== Infrastructure ==
Directly at the artificial Außenalster lake is the Consulate General of the United States.

=== Health systems ===
In Rotherbaum were 16 day-care centers for children, 142 physicians in private practice and 9 pharmacies.

=== Transportation ===
Rotherbaum is serviced by the rapid transit system of the city train with the stations Hamburg Dammtor, located in the homonymous place. Long distance trains also stop at this station. The Hamburg U-Bahn service the Hallerstraße U1 (blue line) station.

According to the Department of Motor Vehicles (Kraftfahrt-Bundesamt), in the quarter Rotherbaum were 5,446 private cars registered (324 cars/1000 people). There were 201 traffic accidents total, including 173 traffic accidents with damage to persons.

== See also ==
- Rothenbaum, the name of a Bohemian village which was destroyed after World War II when the German inhabitants were expelled in 1945.

== Notes ==
=== References ===
- Statistical office Hamburg and Schleswig-Holstein Statistisches Amt für Hamburg und Schleswig-Holstein, official website (in German)
