= Maigret and the Saturday Caller =

1964 novel by Georges Simenon

- Author: Georges Simenon
- Original title: Maigret et le Client du samedi
- Translator: Tony White
- Language: French
- Series: Inspector Jules Maigret
- Genre: Detective fiction
- Published: 1964 Hamish Hamilton (UK)
- Media type: Print
- OCLC: 504333131
- Preceded by: Maigret and the Good People of Montparnasse
- Followed by: Maigret and the Dosser

Maigret and the Saturday Caller is a novel by the Belgian writer Georges Simenon. The original French version Maigret et le Client du samedi appeared in 1962, and was translated by Siân Reynolds. It is the 59th in the series.

A man visits Inspector Jules Maigret at his home to tell him he wants to kill his wife and her lover. Although it is not an official case, Maigret is interested, particularly when the man disappears.

== Synopsis ==
Maigret's expected Saturday evening in January, enjoying a meal and watching his television (recently installed) at his home on Boulevard Richard-Lenoir, is suspended when Léonard Planchon, a nervous man with a hare lip, visits him. He had always before gone to Police Headquarters and left before seeing Maigret (earning himself the soubriquet "the Saturday Caller); this time he has followed Maigret home. He tells him he wants to murder his wife and her lover. Maigret has not been sought out at home before and is interested in Planchon's story. In a long conversation, Planchon, who has a decorating business, tells Maigret how he met his wife, and about Roger Prou, an employee. Prou has moved into his house and into his bedroom; Planchon has to sleep on a camp bed. In the evenings he visits bistros and gets drunk. Maigret, in the unusual position of investigating the human element of a crime which has not been committed, by a man in despair who has confessed beforehand, Maigret tells Planchon to phone him every day.

On Sunday morning Maigret phones Headquarters and asks if there are any reports from the 18th arrondissement of Paris, where Planchon lives, thinking there might be a murder. In the afternoon, Maigret and his wife take a walk past Planchon's home; on Monday he gets colleagues, pretending to be council surveyors, to look round the house. Planchon phones that evening, but not the following day. On Wednesday, still not having heard from him, Maigret phones the house; Prou replies, saying Planchon will not be back.

Maigret visits the house and sees Planchon's wife Renée; she says that Planchon left with suitcases on Monday evening, and that three weeks earlier he had signed the business over to Prou.

Although Maigret is not sure what sort of case he is investigating, he manages to get permission from the Deputy Prosecutor to interview Planchon's employees. The last interview is with Prou, who explains how he found the cash for Planchon's business, some of it borrowed from relatives. During the interview Maigret borrows the transfer document for the police graphologist, who believes Planchon's signature may have been forged. (Maigret finds this modern forensics method most interesting.)

Maigret's colleagues then check the bars of Montparnasse frequented by Planchon and discover a most peculiar menage a trois. The culminating lead, however, is a prostitute's story; on Monday he was so drunk she helped him back to his house. Maigret, aware that Planchon could not have left with suitcases if he was too drunk to stand, much less back persuades the Deputy Prosecutor to authorize a search warrant. When a bundle of banknotes is found under floorboards, the case soon reaches its unsatisfactory conclusion, for police work has its limits. His body is found a week later in the Seine.

== Reviews ==
Kirkus Reviews lauded the short novel as "low-keyed, swift-moving, psychologically acute, and absorbing throughout."

== Gallery ==
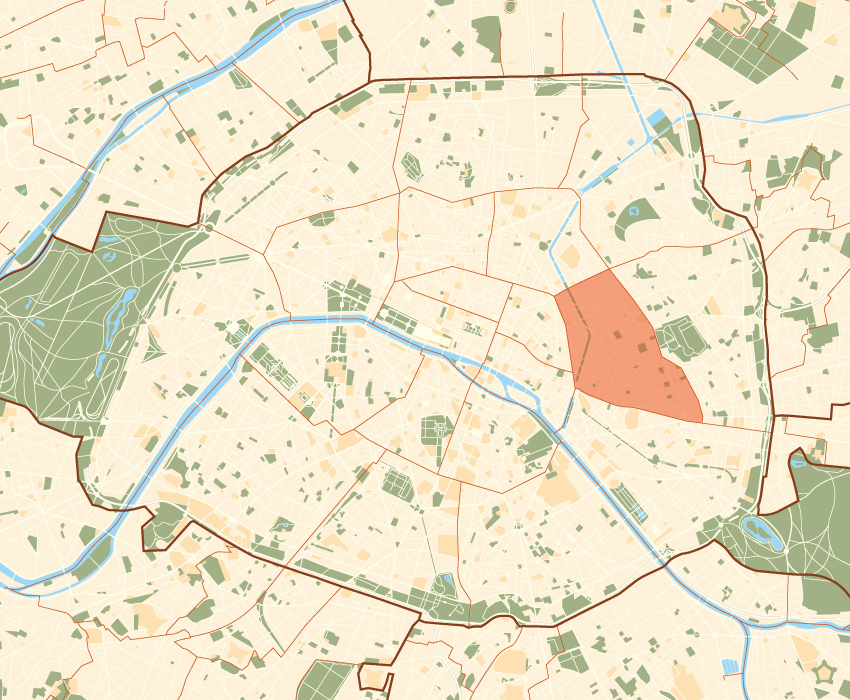
11th arrondissement

Quarters

Blvd. Richard Lenoir, Roquette quarter
