= Jules Maigret =

Fictional French police detective

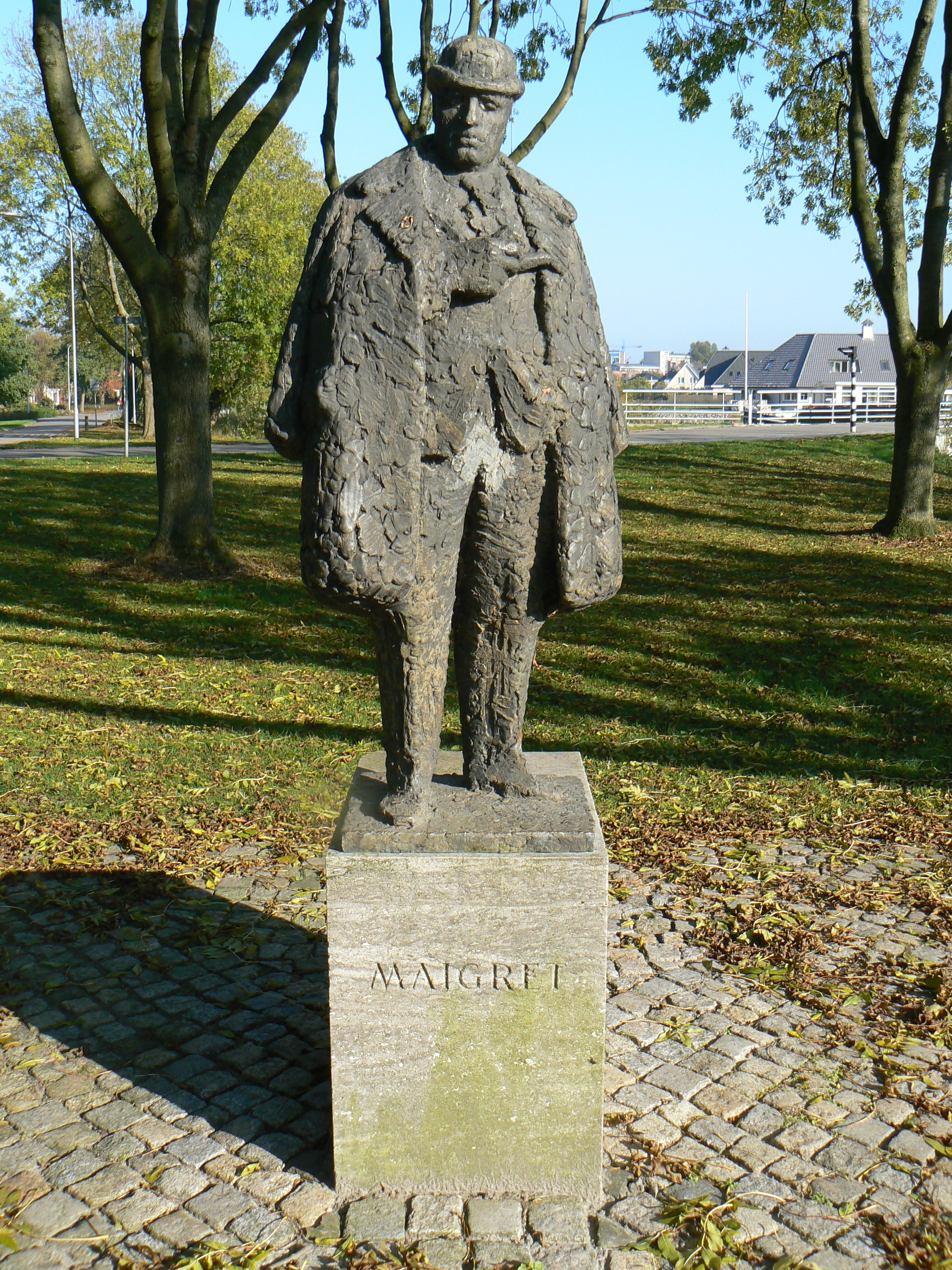
- Maigret statue by Pieter d'Hont in Delfzijl, Netherlands
- First appearance: Pietr the Latvian (1930)
- Last appearance: Maigret and Monsieur Charles (1972)
- Created by: Georges Simenon
- Portrayed by: Numerous: Pierre Renoir; Abel Tarride; Harry Baur; Charles Laughton; Michel Simon; Albert Préjean; Romney Brent; Luis van Rooten; Maurice Manson; Jean Gabin; Gino Cervi; Basil Sydney; Louis Arbessier; Rupert Davies; Kees Brusse; Heinz Rühmann; Jan Teulings; Jean Richard; Rudolf Hrušínský; Boris Tenin; Maurice Denham; Bernard Hepton; Kinya Aikawa; Richard Harris; Armen Dzhigarkhanyan; Bruno Cremer; Michael Gambon; Barry Foster; Vladimir Samoilov; Sergio Castellitto; Nicholas Le Prevost; Rowan Atkinson; Gerard Depardieu; Benjamin Wainwright; Denis Podalydès

In-universe information
- Occupation: Detective Chief Inspector
- Family: Evariste Maigret (father); Hernance Maigret (mother)
- Spouse: Louise Léonard (m. 1912)
- Nationality: French

Jules Maigret (French: [ʒyl mɛɡʁɛ]), or simply Maigret, is a fictional French police detective created by writer Georges Simenon. He is divisional commissaire ("Chief Inspector") of the criminal brigade of the judicial police, based at 36, Quai des Orfèvres, Paris.The character's full name is Jules Amédée François Maigret. (Note: In Maigret's Revolver (page 7) his name is revealed by the narrator to be Jules-Joseph Anthelme Maigret.)

Between 1930 and 1972, 75 novels and 28 short stories about Maigret were published, starting with Pietr the Latvian and concluding with Maigret and Monsieur Charles.The novels and stories have been translated into more than 50 languages, and have been adapted for film, television and other media over 300 times worldwide.

Penguin Books published new translations of 75 novels in the series over as many months from November 2013. In 2025 Picador began a three-year publishing run of the novels in the United States, mostly using the translations commissioned by Penguin.

== Character ==
=== Creation ===
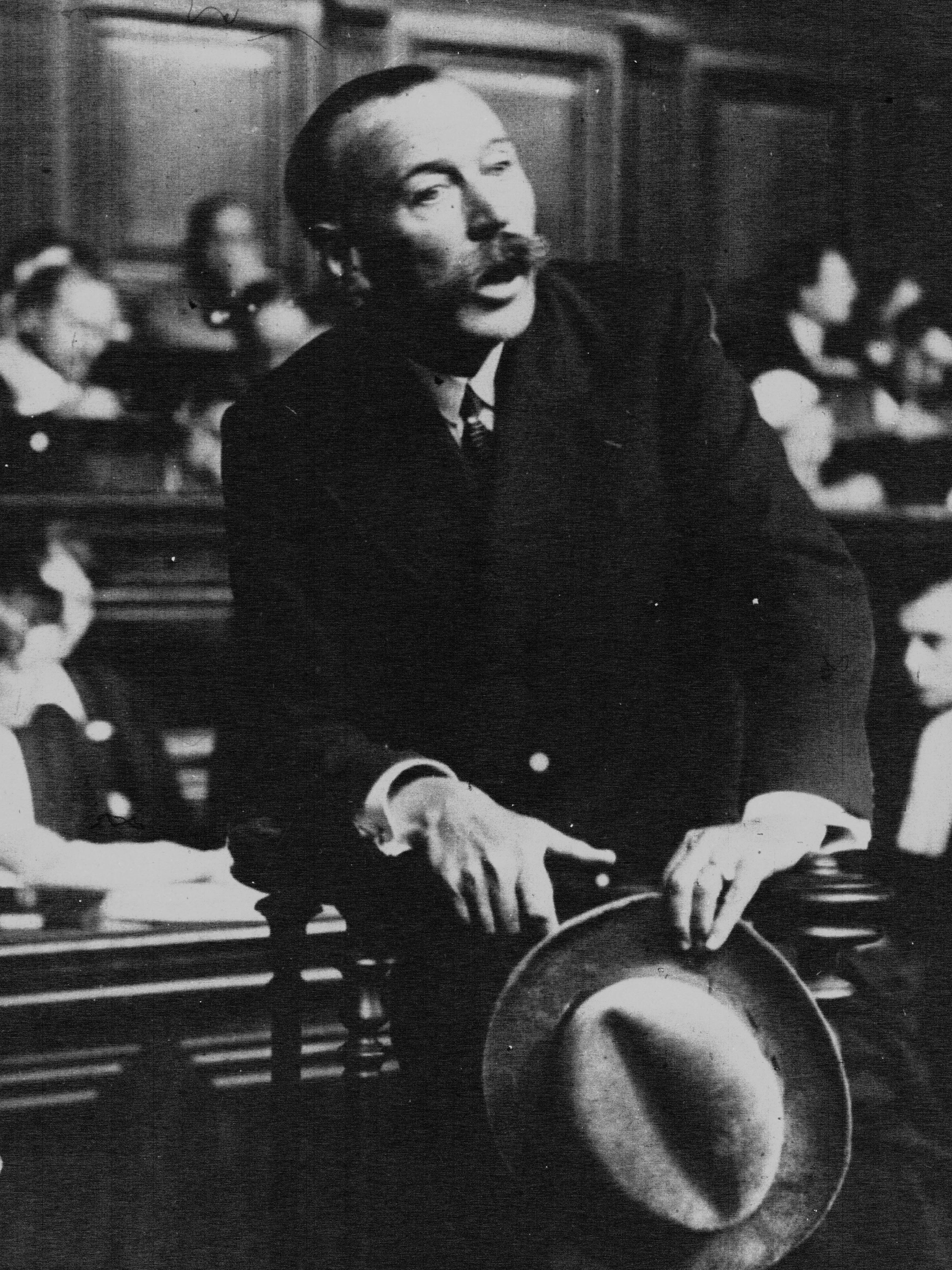
Marcel Guillaume, a celebrated French police commissioner, pictured giving evidence in 1932. He has been seen as a possible inspiration for Maigret.

Simenon himself portrays Maigret in a 1952 Studio Harcourt publicity shot

In the spring of 1929, Simenon set off for a tour of northern France, Belgium and Holland in his boat, the Ostrogoth. He had begun contributing detective stories to a new magazine called Détective and also published popular novels, mainly with the publisher Fayard.

During his northern tour, Simenon wrote three popular novels which featured a police inspector named Maigret: Train de nuit (Night Train), La femme rousse (The Red-Headed Woman) and La maison de l'inquiétude (The House of Anxiety). He began working on Train de nuit, or possibly Pietr-le-Letton (Pietr the Latvian), in September 1929 when the Ostrogoth was undergoing repairs in the Dutch city of Delfzijl.

On his return to Paris in April 1930, Simenon completed Pietr-le-Letton, the first novel in which inspector Maigret of the Paris mobile crime brigade was a fully developed character. The novel was serialised in Fayard's magazine Ric et Rac later that year. Simenon considered this the first "true" Maigret novel, and it was the first fictional work to appear under Simenon's real name.

Simenon stated that he invented Maigret while drinking in a cafe and imagining a Parisian policeman: "a large powerfully built gentleman...a pipe, a bowler hat, a thick overcoat." Maigret was reputed to be based on Marcel Guillaume, an actual French detective, although Simenon variously claimed not to remember the inspiration or that Maigret was influenced by his father.

Biographers Thomas Narcejac and Fenton Bresler both see Simenon himself in his creation.

=== Description and biography ===
Maigret is tall and heavy, with broad shoulders, large hands, a thick face, thick hair, thick eyebrows and bright eyes of a "greenish gray" colour. He has strongly growing facial hair and therefore shaves every morning. Outdoors, he usually wears a thick black overcoat. In the 1930s, he wears a bowler hat, but from the 1940s he wears a fedora. He frequently smokes a tobacco pipe.

He is happily married to his wife Louise (usually referred to as Madame Maigret). He doesn't like his first name being used and prefers to be called "Maigret". Even his wife usually calls him "Maigret", only using his first name a handful of times.

He is Divisional Chief Inspector of the criminal brigade of the judicial police, based at 36, Quai des Orfèvres, Paris. At work, he is aided by "The Faithful Four": detectives Lucas, Janvier, Lapointe, and Torrence. Other prominent characters include police surgeon Dr. Paul; Judge Coméliau, the Examining Magistrate who alternates between being a help and a hindrance to Maigret; Joseph Moers, a forensic specialist; and Dr. Pardon, Maigret's close friend and physician.

In most novels, Maigret is aged around 45 to 55 years. There are contradictory clues to his year of birth. In Monsieur Gallet, décédé, which takes place in 1930, Maigret is described as 45, indicating 1885 as his year of birth. In another novel, La première enquete de Maigret, where the investigation takes place in 1913, the author states that Maigret is 26, which establish his year of birth as 1887. In the 1932 novel L'affaire Saint-Fiacre, Maigret is 42, which would mean he was born in 1890, assuming he is contemporary to the year the novel was written.

Maigret is from the fictional village of Saint-Fiacre in the Allier department, (Note: In The Saint-Fiacre Affair and Maigret's Memoirs the narrator states that Maigret spent his childhood in Saint-Fiacre near Matignon. In Maigret's Vacation, however, Maigret reflects on his time as an altar boy "in his Allier village".) where his father, Evariste Maigret, was the bailiff for the local landowner. Maigret's mother died in childbirth when he was eight. He studied medicine at Nantes, but dropped out when his father died. He began working as a police officer in Paris in his twenties. At the age of 30, he entered the Homicide Squad and became chief inspector of the squad in his late thirties. He probably retired at the age of 55, giving him over 30 years of police experience.

=== Personality and work method ===
Maigret can be gruff, but is otherwise patient and unflappable. He has an appreciation of food, especially traditional French dishes and his wife's cooking. His most frequently consumed drinks are beer, white wine and cognac.

He is relentless in his pursuit of criminals. He often follows them himself and isn't averse to breaking into properties without a warrant if necessary. He is famous for his long interrogations of suspects, sustaining himself with beer and sandwiches until the suspect reveals the truth. He is humane and often sympathetic towards the criminals he investigates, seeking to understand them rather than judge them. He fires his gun only four times in his career, twice wounding a criminal in self-defence.

His method is to immerse himself in the life and milieu of the victim in order to discover why the crime was committed and, eventually, who committed it. He relies more on intuition than logical deduction and sometimes tells his colleagues, "I never think." He aspires to be a "mender of destinies". After learning a criminal's story, he sometimes lets them go or reduces the charges against them.

== List of works ==
=== Novels ===
List of Maigret novels with date of French-language publication as well as the Penguin reissue dates and titles. Macmillan Publishers, under its Picador imprint, are republishing the novels in the United States, mostly using the translations commissioned by Penguin, over three years from 2025.

Title	French-language publication date	Penguin UK reissue date	Reissue #	Reissue title	Other English title(s)
Pietr-le-Letton	1930	7 Nov 2013	1	Pietr the Latvian	The Strange Case of Peter the Lett; The Case of Peter the Lett; Maigret and the Enigmatic Lett
M. Gallet décédé	February 1931	5 Dec 2013	2	The Late Monsieur Gallet	The Death of Monsieur Gallet; Maigret Stonewalled
Le Pendu de Saint-Pholien	February 1931	2 Jan 2014	3	The Hanged Man of Saint-Pholien	The Crime of Inspector Maigret; Maigret and the Hundred Gibbets
Le Charretier de la Providence	March 1931	6 Feb 2014	4	The Carter of 'La Providence'	The Crime at Lock 14; Maigret Meets a Milord; Lock 14
Le Chien jaune	April 1931	6 Mar 2014	5	The Yellow Dog	A Face for a Clue; Maigret and the Concarneau Murders; Maigret and the Yellow Dog
La Nuit du carrefour	June 1931	3 Apr 2014	6	Night at the Crossroads	Maigret at the Crossroads; The Night at the Crossroads
Un Crime en Hollande	July 1931	1 May 2014	7	A Crime in Holland	Maigret in Holland
Au Rendez-vous des Terre-Neuves	August 1931	5 June 2014	8	The Grand Banks Café	The Sailors' Rendezvous; Maigret Answers a Plea
La Tête d'un homme (L'Homme de la Tour Eiffel)	September 1931	3 July 2014	9	A Man's Head	A Battle of Nerves; Maigret's War of Nerves
La Danseuse du Gai-Moulin	November 1931	7 Aug 2014	10	The Dancer at the Gai Moulin	At the Gai Moulin; Maigret at the Gai Moulin
La Guinguette à deux sous	December 1931	4 Sep 2014	11	The Two-Penny Bar	Guinguette by the Seine; Maigret and the Tavern by the Seine; Maigret to the Rescue; A Spot by the Seine; The Bar on the Seine
L'Ombre chinoise	January 1932	2 Oct 2014	12	The Shadow Puppet	The Shadow in the Courtyard; Maigret Mystified
L'Affaire Saint-Fiacre	February 1932	6 Nov 2014	13	The Saint-Fiacre Affair	Maigret and the Countess; Maigret Goes Home; Maigret on Home Ground
Chez les Flamands	March 1932	4 Dec 2014	14	The Flemish House	Maigret and the Flemish Shop; The Flemish House
Le Fou de Bergerac	April 1932	1 Jan 2015	15	The Madman of Bergerac	
Le Port des brumes	May 1932	5 Feb 2015	16	The Misty Harbour	Death of a Harbour Master; Maigret and the Death of a Harbor Master; The Port of Shadows
Liberty Bar	June 1932	5 Mar 2015	17	Liberty Bar	Maigret on the Riviera
L'Écluse nº 1	June 1933	2 Apr 2015	18	Lock No. 1	The Lock at Charenton; Maigret Sits It Out
Maigret	March 1934	7 May 2015	19	Maigret	Maigret Returns
La Maison du juge	October 1942	6 Aug 2015	22	The Judge's House	Maigret in Exile
Les Caves du Majestic	October 1942	2 July 2015	21	The Cellars of the Majestic	Maigret and the Hotel Majestic; The Hotel Majestic
Cécile est morte	October 1942	4 June 2015	20	Cécile is Dead	Maigret and the Spinster
Signé Picpus	January 1944	3 Sep 2015	23	Signed, Picpus	To Any Lengths; Maigret and the Fortuneteller
Félicie est là	January 1944	5 Nov 2015	25	Félicie	Maigret and the Toy Village
L'Inspecteur Cadavre	January 1944	1 Oct 2015	24	Inspector Cadaver	Maigret's Rival
Maigret se fâche	July 1947	3 Dec 2015	26	Maigret Gets Angry	Maigret in Retirement
Maigret à New York	July 1947	7 Jan 2016	27	Maigret in New York	Inspector Maigret in New York's Underworld; Maigret in New York's Underworld
Les Vacances de Maigret	November 1947	4 Feb 2016	28	Maigret's Holiday	A Summer Holiday; No Vacation for Maigret; Maigret on Holiday
Maigret et son mort	January 1948	3 Mar 2016	29	Maigret's Dead Man	Maigret's Special Murder
La Première enquête de Maigret, 1913	October 1948	7 Apr 2016	30	Maigret's First Case	Maigret's First Case
Mon ami Maigret	February 1949	5 May 2016	31	My Friend Maigret	The Methods of Maigret
Maigret chez le coroner	July 1949	2 June 2016	32	Maigret at the Coroner's	
L'Amie de M^{me} Maigret	May 1950	4 Aug 2016	34	Madame Maigret's Friend	Madame Maigret's Own Case; The Friend of Madame Maigret
Les Mémoires de Maigret	September 1950	1 Sep 2016	35	Maigret's Memoirs	
Maigret et la vieille dame	February 1950	7 July 2016	33	Maigret and the Old Lady	
Maigret au "Picratt's"	December 1950	6 Oct 2016	36	Maigret at Picratt's	Maigret and the Strangled Stripper; Maigret in Montmartre; Inspector Maigret and the Strangled Stripper
Maigret en meublé	February 1951	3 Nov 2016	37	Maigret Takes a Room	Maigret Rents a Room
Maigret et la grande perche	May 1951	1 Dec 2016	38	Maigret and the Tall Woman	Maigret and the Burglar's Wife
Maigret, Lognon et les gangsters	September 1951	5 Jan 2017	39	Maigret, Lognon and the Gangsters	Inspector Maigret and the Killers; Maigret and the Gangsters
Le Revolver de Maigret	June 1952	2 Feb 2017	40	Maigret's Revolver	
Maigret et l'homme du banc	1953	2 Mar 2017	41	Maigret and the Man on the Bench	Maigret and the Man on the Boulevard; The Man on the Boulevard
Maigret a peur	March 1953	6 Apr 2017	42	Maigret Is Afraid	Maigret Afraid
Maigret se trompe	August 1953	4 May 2017	43	Maigret's Mistake	
Maigret à l'école	December 1953	1 June 2017	44	Maigret Goes to School	
Maigret et la jeune morte	January 1954	6 July 2017	45	Maigret and the Dead Girl	Inspector Maigret and the Dead Girl; Maigret and the Young Girl
Maigret chez le ministre	August 1954	3 Aug 2017	46	Maigret and the Minister	Maigret and the Calame Report
Maigret et le corps sans tête	January 1955	7 Sep 2017	47	Maigret and the Headless Corpse	
Maigret tend un piège	July 1955	5 Oct 2017	48	Maigret Sets a Trap	
Un échec de Maigret	March 1956	2 Nov 2017	49	Maigret's Failure	
Maigret s'amuse	September 1956	7 Dec 2017	50	Maigret Enjoys Himself	Maigret's Little Joke; None of Maigret's Business
Maigret voyage	August 1957	4 Jan 2018	51	Maigret Travels	Maigret and the Millionaires
Les scrupules de Maigret	December 1957	1 Feb 2018	52	Maigret's Doubts	Maigret Has Scruples
Maigret et les témoins récalcitrants	October 1958	1 Mar 2018	53	Maigret and the Reluctant Witnesses	
Une confidence de Maigret	May 1959	5 Apr 2018	54	Maigret's Secret	Maigret Has Doubts
Maigret aux assises	November 1959	3 May 2018	55	Maigret in Court	
Maigret et les vieillards	June 1960	7 June 2018	56	Maigret and the Old People	Maigret in Society
Maigret et le voleur paresseux	January 1961	5 July 2018	57	Maigret and the Lazy Burglar	Maigret and the Idle Burglar
Maigret et les braves gens	September 1961	2 Aug 2018	58	Maigret and the Good People of Montparnasse	Maigret and the Black Sheep
Maigret et le client du samedi	February 1962	6 Sep 2018	59	Maigret and the Saturday Caller	
Maigret et le clochard	May 1962	4 Oct 2018	60	Maigret and the Tramp	Maigret and the Dosser; Maigret and the Bum
La colère de Maigret	June 1962	1 Nov 2018	61	The Anger of Maigret	Maigret Loses His Temper
Maigret et le fantôme	June 1963	6 Dec 2018	62	Maigret and the Ghost	Maigret and the Apparition
Maigret se défend	July 1964	3 Jan 2019	63	Maigret Defends Himself	Maigret on the Defensive
La Patience de Maigret	March 1965	7 Feb 2019	64	Maigret's Patience	The Patience of Maigret; Maigret Bides His Time
Maigret et l'affaire Nahour	February 1966	7 March 2019	65	Maigret and the Nahour Case	
Le voleur de Maigret	November 1966	4 April 2019	66	Maigret's Pickpocket	Maigret and the Pickpocket
Maigret à Vichy	September 1967	6 June 2019	68	Maigret in Vichy	Maigret Takes the Waters
Maigret hésite	January 1968	2 May 2019	67	Maigret Hesitates	
L'ami d'enfance de Maigret	June 1968	4 July 2019	69	Maigret's Childhood Friend	Maigret's Boyhood Friend
Maigret et le tueur	April 1969	1 Aug 2019	70	Maigret and the Killer	
Maigret et le marchand de vin	September 1969	5 Sep 2019	71	Maigret and the Wine Merchant	
La Folle de Maigret	May 1970	3 Oct 2019	72	Maigret's Madwoman	Maigret and the Madwoman
Maigret et l'homme tout seul	February 1971	7 Nov 2019	73	Maigret and the Loner	
Maigret et l'indicateur	June 1971	5 Dec 2019	74	Maigret and the Informer	Maigret and the Flea
Maigret et Monsieur Charles	February 1972	9 Jan 2020	75	Maigret and Monsieur Charles	

=== Short stories ===
List of Maigret short stories by date of first publication in French.

Title	Date	English title(s)
"L'affaire du boulevard Beaumarchais"	1936	"The Affair of the Boulevard Beaumarchais" "The Mysterious Affair in the Boulevard Beaumarchais"
"La péniche aux deux pendus"	1936	"The Barge with Two Hanging Bodies" "Inspector Maigret Thinks" "Dead Man's Barge" "Two Bodies on a Barge"
"La fenêtre ouverte"	1936	"The Open Window" "Inspector Maigret Smokes His Pipe"
"Peine de mort"	1936	"Inspector Maigret's War of Nerves" "Death Penalty"
"Les larmes de bougie"	1936	"Journey into Time" "Journey Backward into Time" "Death of a Woodlander" "Candle Wax"
"Rue Pigalle"	1936	"Maigret in Rue Pigalle" "Inspector Maigret Investigates" "In the Rue Pigalle"
"Monsieur Lundi"	1936	"Mr. Monday" "Inspector Maigret Hesitates"
"Une erreur de Maigret"	1937	"Maigret's Mistake" "Maigret Gets It Wrong"
"Stan le tueur"	1938	"Stan the Killer"
"L'auberge aux noyés"	1938	"The Inn of the Drowned" "The Drowned Men's Inn"
"L'Étoile du Nord"	1938	"At the Étoile du Nord"
"Tempête sur la Manche"	1938	"Storm in the Channel" "Storm over the Channel"
"Mademoiselle Berthe et son amant"	1938	"Maigret and the Frightened Dressmaker" "Mademoiselle Berthe and her Lover" "Mademoiselle Berthe's Lover"
"L'improbable Monsieur Owen"	1938	"The Unlikely Monsieur Owen" "The Improbable Monsieur Owen"
"Ceux du Grand Café"	1938	"The Group at the Grand-Café" "The Men at the Grant Café"
"Le notaire de Châteauneuf"	1938	"Inspector Maigret and the Missing Miniatures" "The Three Daughters of the Lawyer" "The Notary from Châteauneuf"
"La vieille dame de Bayeux"	1939	"The Old Lady of Bayeux"
"L'amoureux de Madame Maigret"	1939	"The Stronger Vessel" "Madame Maigret's Admirer" "Madame Maigret's Suitor"
"L'homme dans la rue"	1940	"The Man on the Run" "Inspector Maigret Pursues" "The Man in the Street" "The Man on the Streets"
"Vente à la bougie"	1941	"Under the Hammer" "Inspector Maigret Directs" "Sale by Auction" "Candle Auction"
"Menaces de mort"	1942	"Death Threats"
"Jeumont, 51 minutes d'arrêt"	1944	"Jeumont, 51 Minutes Wait!" "Inspector Maigret Deduces" "Jeumont, 51 Minutes Stop"
"La pipe de Maigret"	1947	"Maigret's Pipe"
"Le témoignage de l'enfant de chœur"	1947	"Elusive Witness" "According to the Altar Boy" "Crime in the Rue Sainte-Catherine" "The Evidence of the Altar-Boy"
"Le client le plus obstiné du monde"	1947	"The Most Obstinate Man in Paris" "The Most Obstinate Customer in the World" "The Most Obstinate Man in the World"
"Maigret et l'inspecteur malgracieux"	1947	"Maigret and the Surly Inspector"
"On ne tue pas les pauvres types"	1947	"Death of a Nobody"
"Un noël de Maigret"	1951	"Maigret's Christmas"
"Sept Petites Croix dans un carnet"	1951	"Seven Little Crosses in a Notebook"

== In other media ==
The novels and stories have been adapted for film, television and other media over 300 times worldwide.

=== Audiobooks ===
Following the Penguin reissue of the 75 novels, actor Gareth Armstrong started recording each for Audible. Recordings took one day per book. By September 2015, he had recorded 25 of them. He has since completed all 75 recordings.

=== Theatre ===
A production called Maigret and the Lady by Philip Mackie toured in England and Scotland in 1965, before playing at the Strand Theatre in London in October 1965. Madame Maigret was played by Charmian Eyre, and Maigret was Rupert Davies.

=== Film ===
The cinematic potential of Maigret was realized quickly: the first screen Maigret was Pierre Renoir in 1932's Night at the Crossroads, directed by his brother Jean Renoir; the same year brought The Yellow Dog with Abel Tarride, and Harry Baur played him in 1933's A Man's Neck, directed by Julien Duvivier.

In 1950, Charles Laughton played the first English-language Maigret in The Man on the Eiffel Tower, adapted from the 1931 novel A Battle of Nerves. The film co-starred Franchot Tone, Burgess Meredith, and Wilfrid Hyde-White. Back in France, Michel Simon played the character in Full House.

Albert Préjean portrayed Maigret in three films: Picpus, Cecile Is Dead, and Majestic Hotel Cellars. A decade later, Jean Gabin played the part in three other films: Maigret Sets a Trap, Maigret et l'Affaire Saint-Fiacre, and Maigret voit rouge. Maurice Manson appeared in Maigret dirige l'enquête (1956), whilst Heinz Rühmann played the lead in a 1966 European international co-production Enter Inspector Maigret.

Gérard Depardieu starred as Maigret in a 2022 French film, entitled Maigret, adapted from Maigret and the Dead Girl.

In 2024, director Pascal Bonitzer announced he would write and direct Maigret and the Dead Lover, starring Denis Podalydès. The film was released in 2026.

=== Television ===
There have been numerous incarnations of Maigret on the small screen all around the world. He has been portrayed by French, British, Irish, Austrian, German, Italian, Dutch, Japanese, and Russian actors. A French version, Les Enquêtes du Commissaire Maigret, starred Jean Richard in 88 episodes between 1967 and 1990; however, Simenon himself is said to have disliked Richard's Maigret because he would not take his hat off when entering a room. Later, Bruno Cremer played the character in 54 adaptations between 1991 and 2005.

Romney Brent played Maigret in the Studio One episode "Stan the Killer", whilst Luis van Rooten starred in an episode of Suspense entitled "The Old Lady of Bayeux". Louis Arbessier appeared in a televised film of Liberty Bar. The Italian actor Gino Cervi played the character on Italian television from 1964 up to 1972 in Le inchieste del commissario Maigret; Simenon himself considered Cervi's interpretation of the character to be "very good." This series resulted in 14 novels and 2 short stories being adapted.

In the late 1960s, Simenon's son Marc created a television spinoff entitled Les Dossiers de l'Agence O. Pierre Tornade starred as Maigret's former sidekick Torrence, now working for a private investigation agency. The series featured guest appearances by other characters from the Maigret canon, including inspectors Lucas (Pierre Mondy), and Janvier (Louis Arbessier).

In the Soviet Union, Russian theatre actor Boris Tenin portrayed Maigret in several TV films in the 1970s. In Soviet cinema, apart from Boris Tenin, Maigret was portrayed by cinema actors Vladimir Samoilov and Armen Dzhigarkhanyan.

In Japan, Kinya Aikawa played Megure, a Japanese-born equivalent to the French Maigret, reinvented in a modern Japanese setting, in Tōkyō. Megure Keishi, a 25-episode TV series aired from 14 April to 29 May 1978 on Asahi TV. Megure's wife was played by Sato Tomomi, who earned the praises of Simenon himself: "The best 'Madame Maigret' in my opinion, even including the French ones, was the 'Madame Maigret' on Japanese television. She was exactly right".

Rupert Davies played the title role in the 1960s British Maigret TV series, which debuted on 31 October 1960. Davies took over the part after Basil Sydney, who appeared as Maigret in the original transmitted pilot, proved unavailable owing to ill-health. Davies went on to star in 52 adaptations for BBC TV in that decade. His portrayal won two of the highest accolades: his versions were dubbed into French and played across the Channel; and Simenon himself said of Davies "At last, I have found the perfect Maigret!" The theme tune to the TV series, "Midnight in Montmartre", was composed by Ron Grainer. Kees Brusse and Jan Teulings also portrayed the character in separate Dutch adaptations produced around the same time.

Granada Television produced an adaptation of Maigret for ITV in 1992 and 1993 in which Michael Gambon starred as Maigret; there were 12 adaptations in the two series. An earlier version, Maigret (1988) on ITV cast Richard Harris in the lead role.

In 2004, Sergio Castellitto played Maigret in two Italian TV movies: La trappola ("The Trap") and L'ombra cinese ("The Chinese Shadow").

Rowan Atkinson played Maigret in four television films made by ITV from 2016 to 2017. The first two episodes were adapted from Maigret Sets a Trap and Maigret's Dead Man. Two further episodes were broadcast in 2017, adapted from Maigret at the Crossroads and Maigret in Montmartre.

In 2021, the Simenon estate signed a co-production and licensing deal with Playground Entertainment and Red Arrow Studios to produce a new English-language series, with the option extending to the entire Maigret canon. In September 2024, the cast and crew for the series was announced, led by Benjamin Wainwright as Maigret. The new series first aired in October 2025.

=== Radio ===
Maurice Denham played Chief Inspector Maigret in a series of three-quarter-hour dramatizations of the novels on BBC Radio 4 beginning in 1976, with Michael Gough playing Georges Simenon. The format of each play would begin with Maigret and Simenon sitting together discussing some fact or event which would then lead into Maigret's recounting a particular case, with Simenon asking questions or commenting from time to time. After Denham's death, the series was continued in 2003 with Nicholas Le Prevost playing a gruffer, more earthy Maigret and Julian Barnes playing Simenon.

In the interim, Bernard Hepton starred in a 1986 Saturday Night Theatre adaptation of Maigret's Special Murder, whilst Barry Foster played the detective in 1998's Maigret's Christmas for the Afternoon Play.

In 1990-1991, abridgments of some of the novels (including "Madame Maigret's Case," "Maigret and the Tavern by the Seine," and "Maigret in Montmartre") were serialized in daily one-minute installments on WNCN, a classical music station in New York City. They were read every night at midnight in a radio program called the "H.B.J. Midnight Murder Mystery Minute."

=== Comics ===
Jacques Blondeau adapted the novels into the comic series Maigret (1950–53), published in Samedi Soir and Paris Journal. Rumeu (drawings) and Camille Dulac (script) adapted the Maigret story L'Affaire Nahour into the comic strip Maigret in 1969. Between 1992 and 1997 the series Maigret inspired five albums, drawn by Philippe Wurm and Frank Brichau.

== Statue ==
In 1966 a statue of Maigret by Pieter d'Hont was erected in Delfzijl, Netherlands, where Simenon wrote the first Maigret novel. Simenon unveiled it on 3 September 1966, and several actors who had portrayed Maigret attended.
