= Maigret Goes to School =

1954 novel by Georges Simenon

- First edition
- Author: Georges Simenon
- Original title: Maigret à l'école
- Language: French
- Series: Inspector Jules Maigret
- Release number: 44
- Genre: Detective fiction
- Publisher: Presses de la Cité
- Publication date: 1954
- Media type: Print
- Preceded by: Maigret's Mistake
- Followed by: Inspector Maigret and the Dead Girl

Maigret Goes to School (French: Maigret à l'école) is a 1954 detective novel by the Belgian writer Georges Simenon featuring his character Jules Maigret.

== Plot ==
In the story, Maigret is called from his usual duties in Paris to investigate a murder in a small village located close to La Rochelle. A local postmistress has been killed and suspicion has fallen on the local schoolmaster. When Maigret gets there, he discovers a very inward-looking community, which generally hated the dead woman because she knew all of their secrets.

== Adaptations ==
It has been adapted several times for television. In 1992, it was made into an episode of an ITV Maigret series.
