= Maigret's First Case =

1948 detective novel by Georges Simenon

- First edition
- Author: Georges Simenon
- Original title: La première enquête de Maigret
- Translator: Robert Brain
- Language: French
- Series: Inspector Jules Maigret
- Genre: Detective fiction
- Publisher: Presses de la Cité
- Publication date: 1948
- English publication date: 1958
- Media type: Print
- Preceded by: Maigret's Dead Man
- Followed by: My Friend Maigret

Maigret's First Case (French: La Première enquête de Maigret, 1913) is a 1948 detective novel by the Belgian writer Georges Simenon, featuring his character Jules Maigret. It was first translated into English by Robert Brain, in 1958, and more recently by Ros Schwartz in 2016, published in America by the Picador literary imprint of MacMillan Publishing. A retrospective on the beginning of Maigret's career, it is the 57th of the series.

== Plot ==
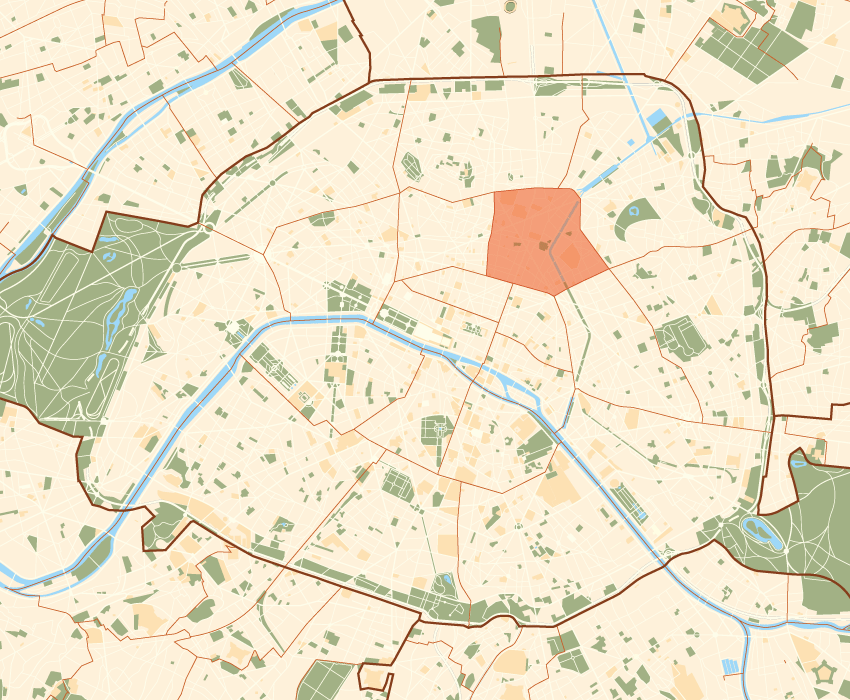
10th Arrondissement of Paris

Having worked his way up the ranks of routine police work, Maigret now serves as the secretary of the "Saint-Georges" district station's chief inspector in the 10th arrondissement of Paris. When a flautist returning home from a late-night gig enters past 1:00 a.m and excitedly reports hearing a woman shouting for help from an apartment, and then a gunshot, he takes it upon himself to investigate. He immediately finds himself out of his depth, but in dogged watching and waiting the first elements of his famous method begin to appear...
