= Maigret and the Coroner =

1949 novel by Georges Simenon

- Author: Georges Simenon
- Original title: French: Maigret chez le coroner
- Language: French
- Series: Inspector Jules Maigret
- Genre: Detective fiction, crime fiction
- Publisher: Presses de la Cité
- Publication date: 1949
- Publication place: Belgium
- English publication date: 1980
- Media type: Print
- Preceded by: My Friend Maigret
- Followed by: Maigret and the Old Lady

Maigret and the Coroner (other English-language title is Maigret at the Coroner's; French: Maigret chez le coroner) is a detective novel by Belgian writer Georges Simenon, featuring his character Inspector Jules Maigret. The novel was written between 21 and 30 July 1949, in Tucson, Arizona, United States. The book was published in October the same year by Presses de la Cité.

== Translations ==
The book was translated into English by Frances Keene and published in 1980 as Maigret and the Coroner in London and as Maigret at the Coroner's in New York. In 2016 the novel was translated again, by Linda Coverdale, and published under the title Maigret at the Coroner.

The first German translation, by Jean Raimond, was published by Kiepenheuer & Witsch in 1959. A new translation by Wolfram Schäfer was published by Diogenes Verlag in 1981.

== Adaptation ==
The novel was adapted into an episode of the French television series "Les Enquêtes du Commissaire Maigret" (Maigret en Arizona) in 1981, with Jean Richard in the lead role.

== Bibliography ==
- Maurice Piron, Michel Lemoine, L'Univers de Simenon, guide des romans et nouvelles (1931–1972) de Georges Simenon, Presses de la Cité, 1983, p. 316-317 ISBN 978-2-258-01152-6 (in French)
