= Maigret and the Killer =

1969 novel by Georges Simenon

- Author: Georges Simenon
- Original title: Maigret et le tueur
- Translator: Shaun Whiteside
- Language: French
- Genre: Detective fiction
- Publication date: 1969
- Media type: Print
- Preceded by: Maigret's Boyhood Friend
- Followed by: Maigret and the Wine Merchant

Maigret and the Killer (French: Maigret et le tueur) is a 1969 detective novel by the Belgian writer Georges Simenon featuring his character Jules Maigret. It was written in Épalinges, Switzerland April 15–21 April 1969 and has been translated into English by Shaun Whiteside and Lyn Moir.

== Synopsis ==
Maigret investigates the stabbing death in the 11th arrondissement of Paris of Antoine Batille, the son of a wealthy family. There are a plethora of leads, for his hobby was recording ambient sounds and, surreptitiously, conversations. The last such was of the planning (at the Café des Amis) of a burglary. The recording had not been taken, however, which obviates an obvious motive. All of the other recordings are moot. Maigret orders photographs taken of everyone who attends Batille's funeral. He learns soon enough that the killing was truly without motivation except for a compulsion to kill –from the murderer himself.

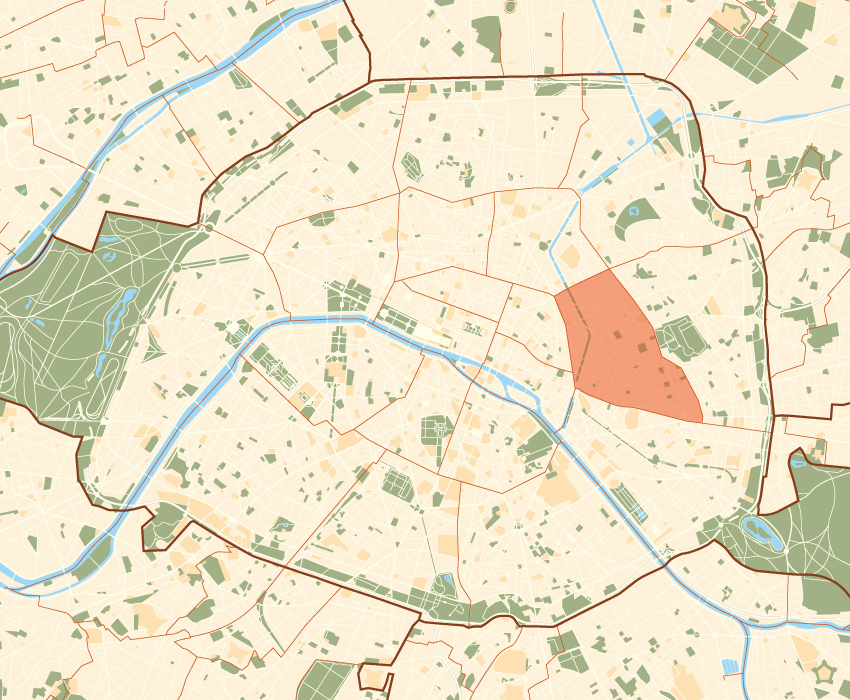
11th arrondissement

Quarters

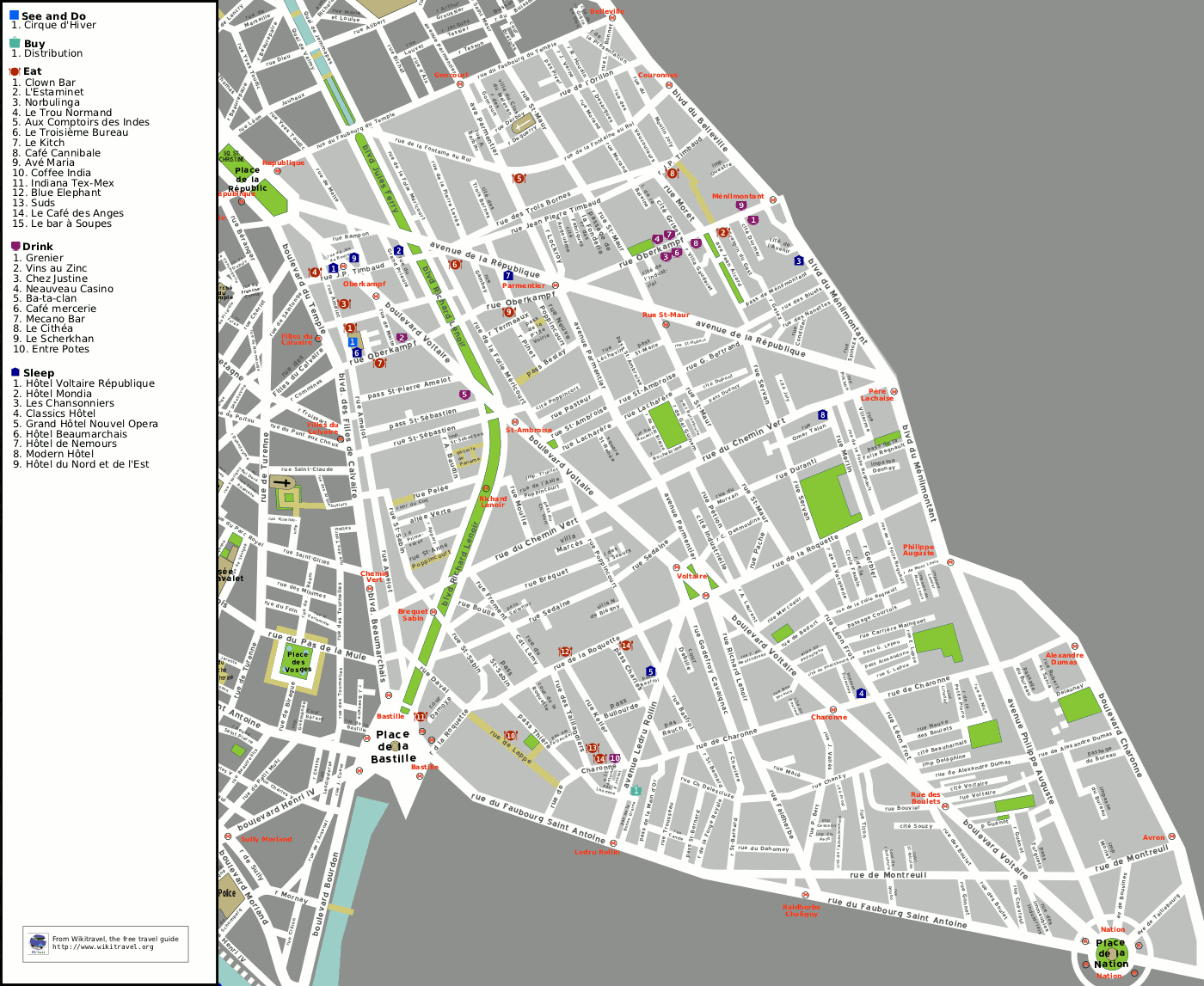
Street map

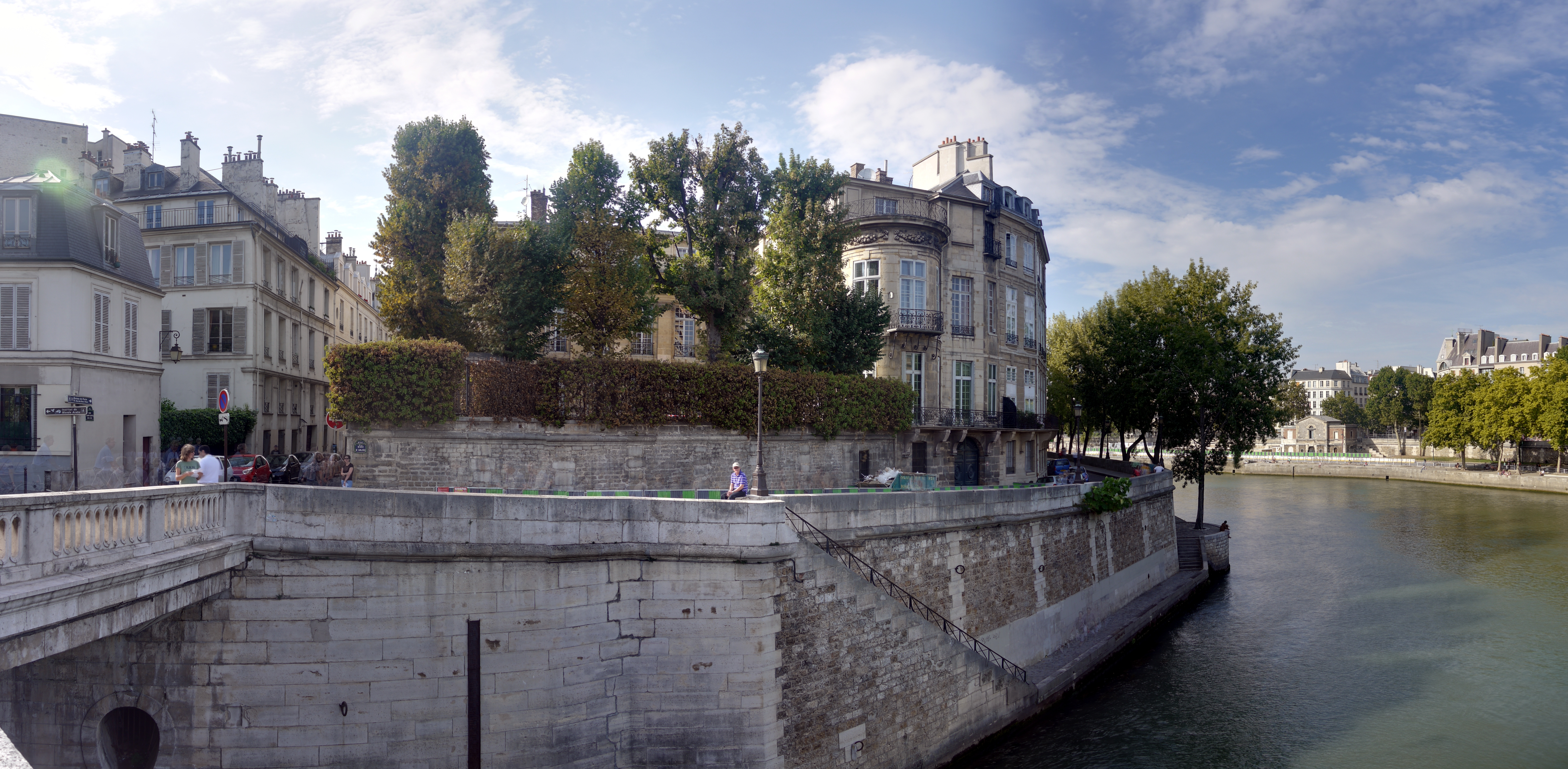
The right bank of the Seine

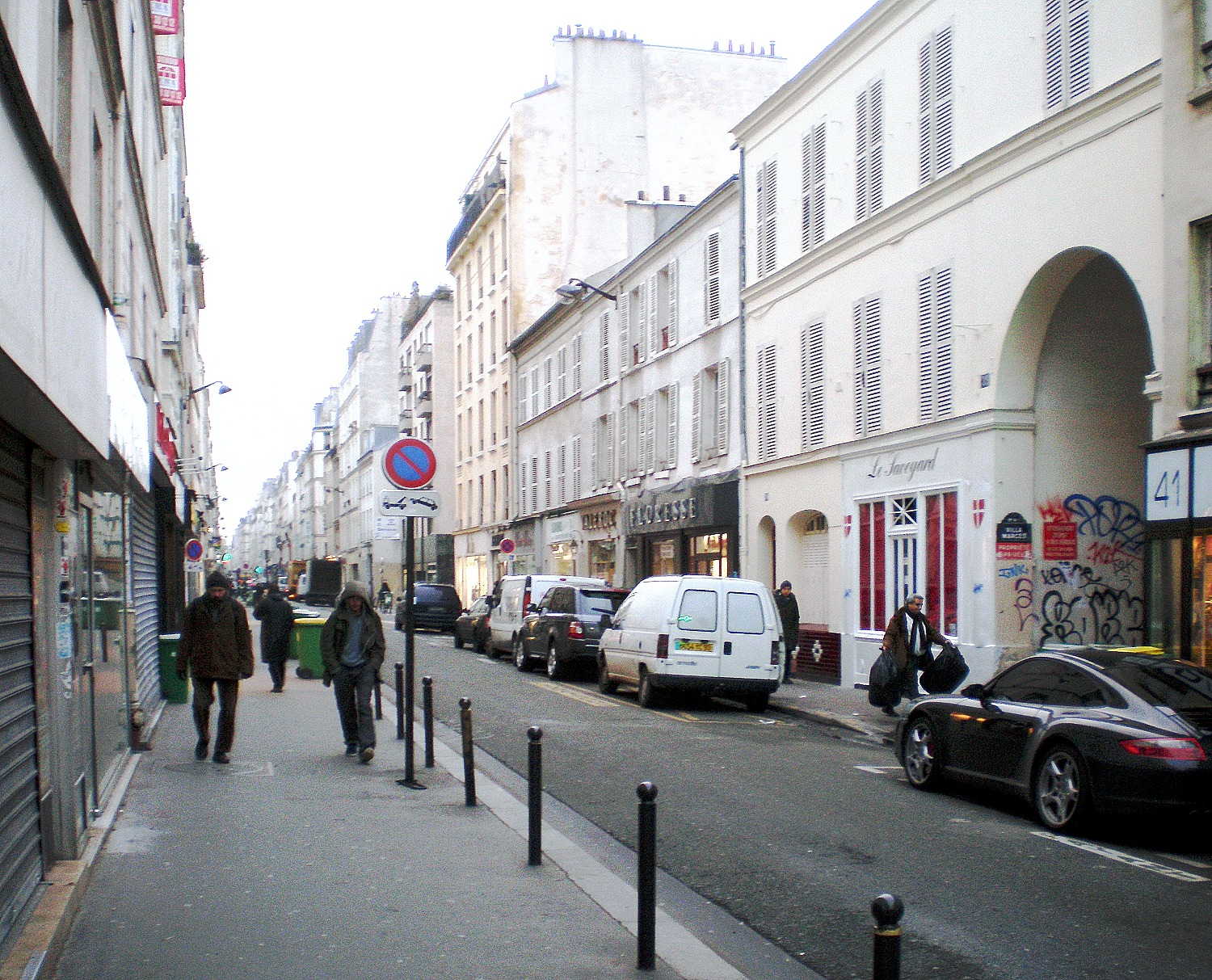
Contemporary street scene
