= Maigret Hesitates =

Novel by Georges Simenon

- First edition
- Author: Georges Simenon
- Original title: Maigret hésite
- Translator: Lyn Moir
- Language: French
- Series: Inspector Jules Maigret
- Release number: 68
- Genre: Detective fiction
- Publisher: Presses de la Cité, Harcourt Brace
- Publication date: 1968
- English publication date: 1969
- Media type: Print
- Preceded by: Maigret in Vichy
- Followed by: Maigret's Boyhood Friend

Maigret Hesitates (French: Maigret hésite) is a detective novel by the Belgian writer Georges Simenon featuring his canonical Chief Inspector Jules Maigret. It was written in Épalinges, Switzerland 24-30 January 1968.

== Overview ==
Letters written on expensive stationery arrives Maigret's desk revealing that a murder will take place, but that the writer is unsure as to whom will die, who will do the killing, and when the killing will occur, Maigret's interest is piqued. He soon enough tracks the bespoke stationery to the home of Emile Parendon, a prominent maritime lawyer, whereupon he receives a second letter criticizing his haste and warning him that he may have precipitated the murder. Despite the urgency of a third and final anonymous letter, tracking down clues to a crime not yet committed on the prestigious Avenue Marigny is not so easy, and when the murder does occur the choice of victim surprises even Maigret.

Originally written in French in 1968, the novel was translated into English by Lyn Moir and published by Harcourt Brace in 1969.

== Adaptations ==
Maigret hésite appeared on French television with Bruno Cremer as Maigret on 26 May 2000 under the title Maigret chez les riches. Also with Jean Richard as Maigret on 6 December 1975 and in a Russian version under the title Megre Kolebletsya with Boris Tenine as Maigret in 1981.

== Gallery ==
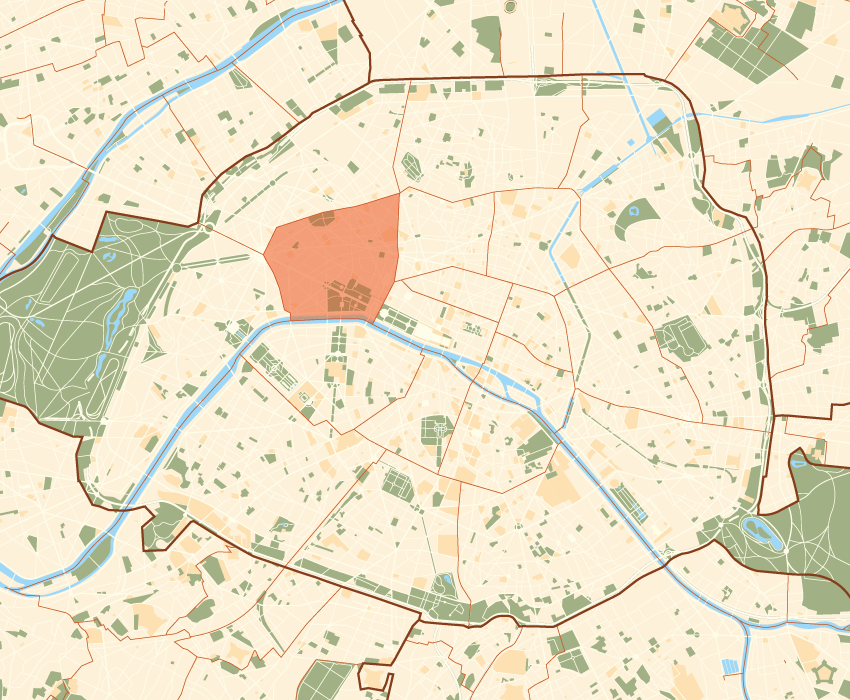
8th arrondissement of Paris

Quartier de la Madeleine

Avenue de Marigny, a branch of the Champs-Élysées (red), to the right. Scale 300 meters.
