= Maigret is Afraid =

1953 novel by Georges Simenon

''Maigret is Afraid'' (French: Maigret a Peur) is a 1953 detective novel by the Belgian writer Georges Simenon featuring Jules Maigret of the French Judicial police. It was written in Lakeville, Connecticut and first published by Presses de la Cité later that same year. (Unusually, this first edition had a press run of 100 numbered copies on "lana" paper.) The 42nd in the series, was first translated into English in 1961 by Margaret Duff by and later in 1971 by Ros Schwartz.

== Synopsis ==
Vendée-Position

Returning from the International Police Congress in Bordeaux, Maigret stops in a Fontenay-le-Comte to visit a childhood friend. Unfortunately his work has arrived with him, for a fellow passenger had asked him if he had come to investigate the murder. In fact, two have been committed at this point. Fontenay-le-Comte, in the Atlantic Vendée department, is gloomy with unremitting rain, divided by two bitter factions, with two homicides yet to come (counting the suicide)...

== Adaptations ==
- The Fontenay Murders, Rupert Davies, BBC TV, 8 October 1963
- Maigret a peur, Jean Richard, Antenne 2, 20 March 1976
- Maigret a peur, Bruno Crémer, France 2, 1 November 1996

== See also ==
- Analysis (English)
- (Original French)
