= Maigret and the Ghost =

1964 novel by Georges Simenon

Maigret and the Ghost (French: Maigret et le fantôme) is a 1964 detective novel by the Belgian writer Georges Simenon featuring Jules Maigret of the French Judicial police. It was written in Echandens, Switzerland 13-17 June 1963 and first published by Presses de la Cité in July 1964. The 62nd in the series, and one of the shortest of the corpus at seven chapters, it was first translated into English by Eileen Ellenbogen in 1976 and then by Ros Schwartz in 2013. It has been adopted as teleplays twice, once in France and one in Finland.

== Synopsis ==
Detective Lognon of the 18th arrondissement has been shot and severely wounded. While he is undergoing surgery at Hospital-Chat, Inspector Maigret and his other comrades try to piece together why he had been renting a room at nights at the Marinette Augier. It proves to have been a good vantage point to surveille the underbelly of the art scene of Montmartre...

== Gallery ==
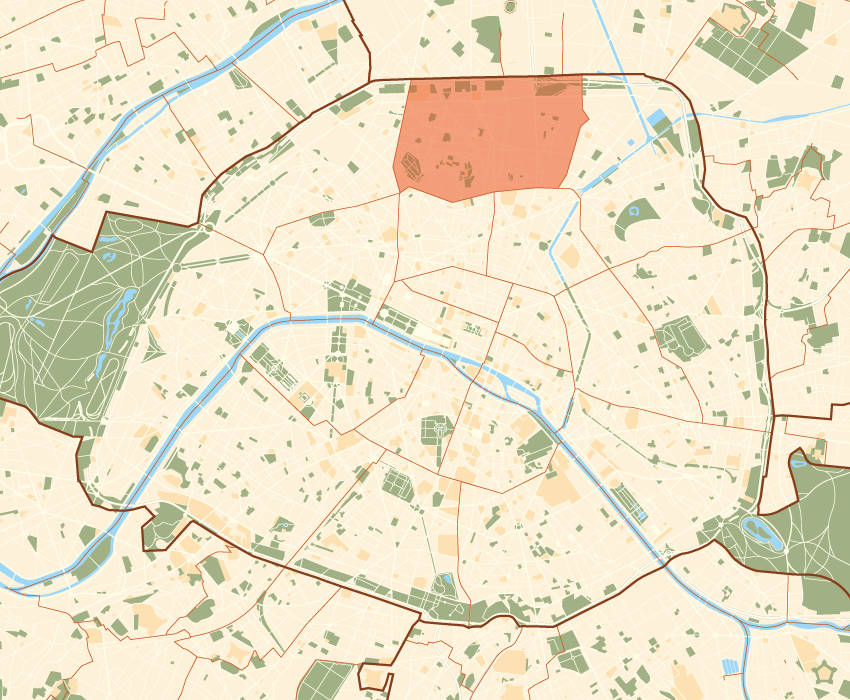
18th arrondissement

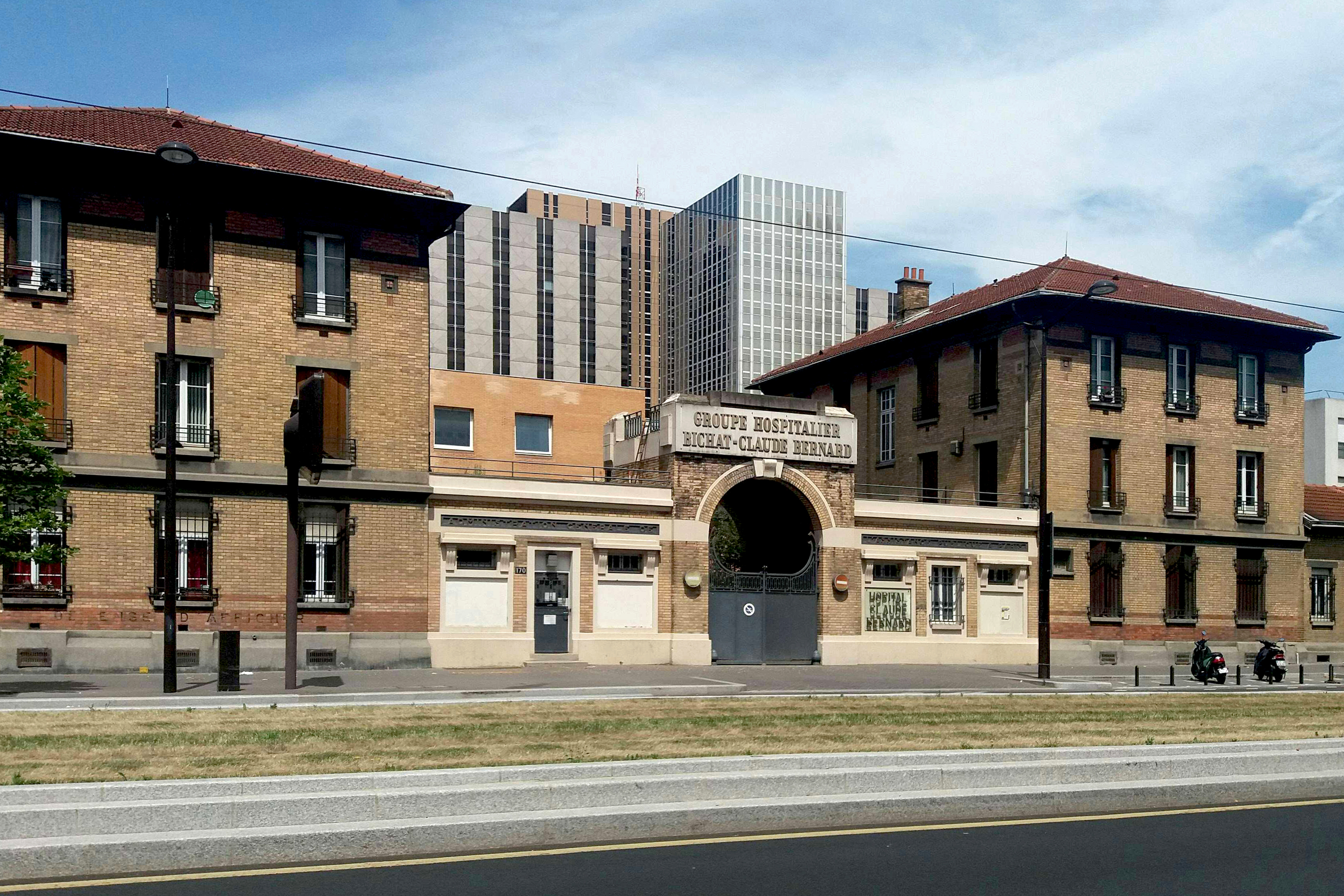
Hospital-Bichat, 2019

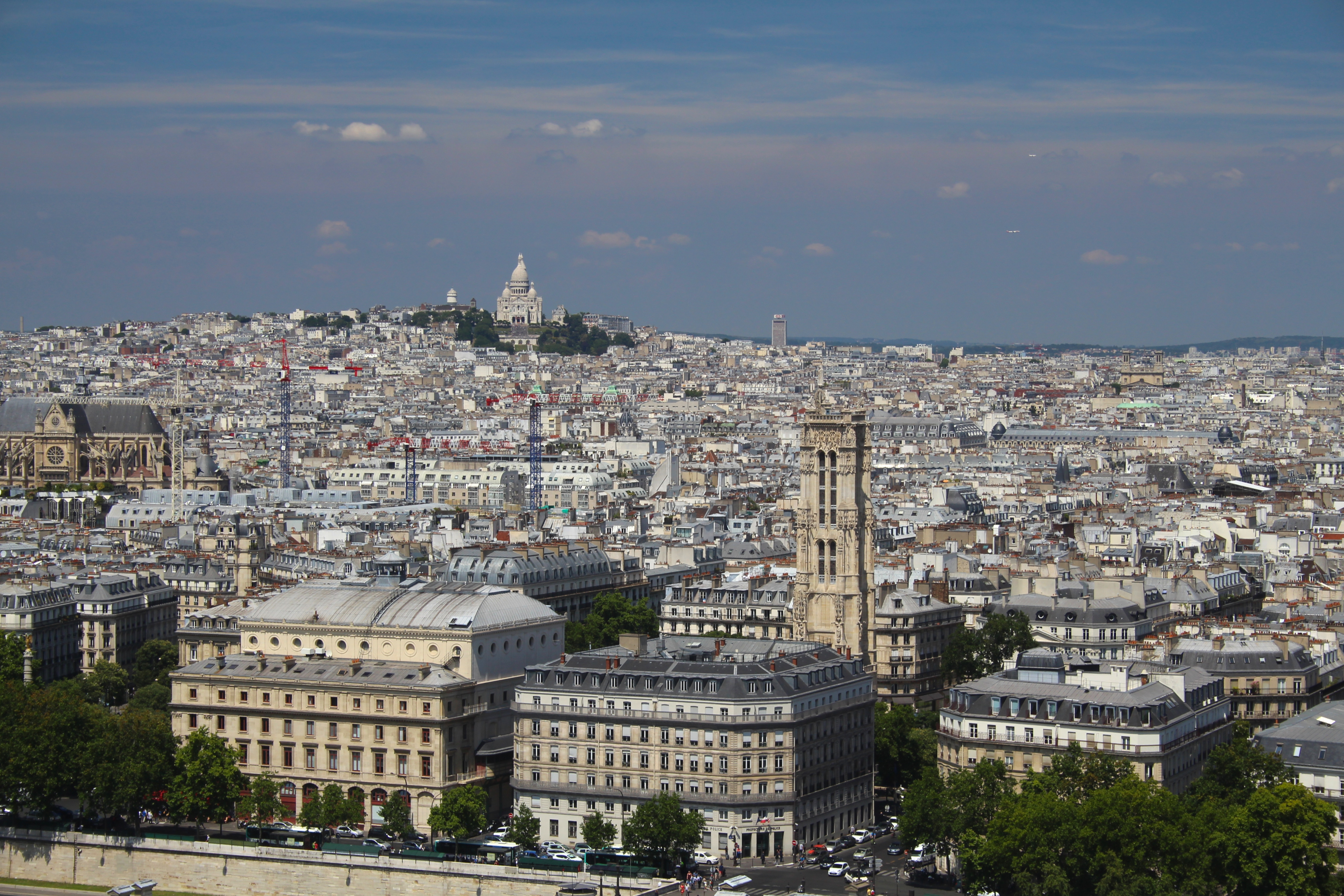
Montmartre
