= Inspector Cadaver =

Inspector Cadaver (French: L'Inspecteur Cadaver) is a 1944 detective novel by the Belgian writer Georges Simenon featuring Jules Maigret of the French Judicial police. It was written in Saint-Mesmin-le-Vieux (Vendée), France from the summer of 1941 to 3 March 1944 and first published by Gallimard later that year. The 24th in the series, and Simenon's last with that publisher, it was first translated into English 1979 by Helen Thompson and later by William Hobson in 2010.

== Synopsis ==
Maigret is investigating a homicide in the small town of Niort (Vendée) at the request of the examining magistrate (whose brother-in-law is rumored to be the killer.) Not only is virtually everyone tight-lipped, he is surprised that a former colleague, Justin Cavre, has come out of retirement and is tight-lipped as well. Maigret now has two mysteries on his hands.

== Adaptations ==
- L'Inspecteur Cadavre, Jean Richard, ORTF, 3 August 1968
- Maigret et l'Inspecteur Cadavre, Bruno Crémer, RTBF, 1 September 1998

== Gallery ==
Vendée department

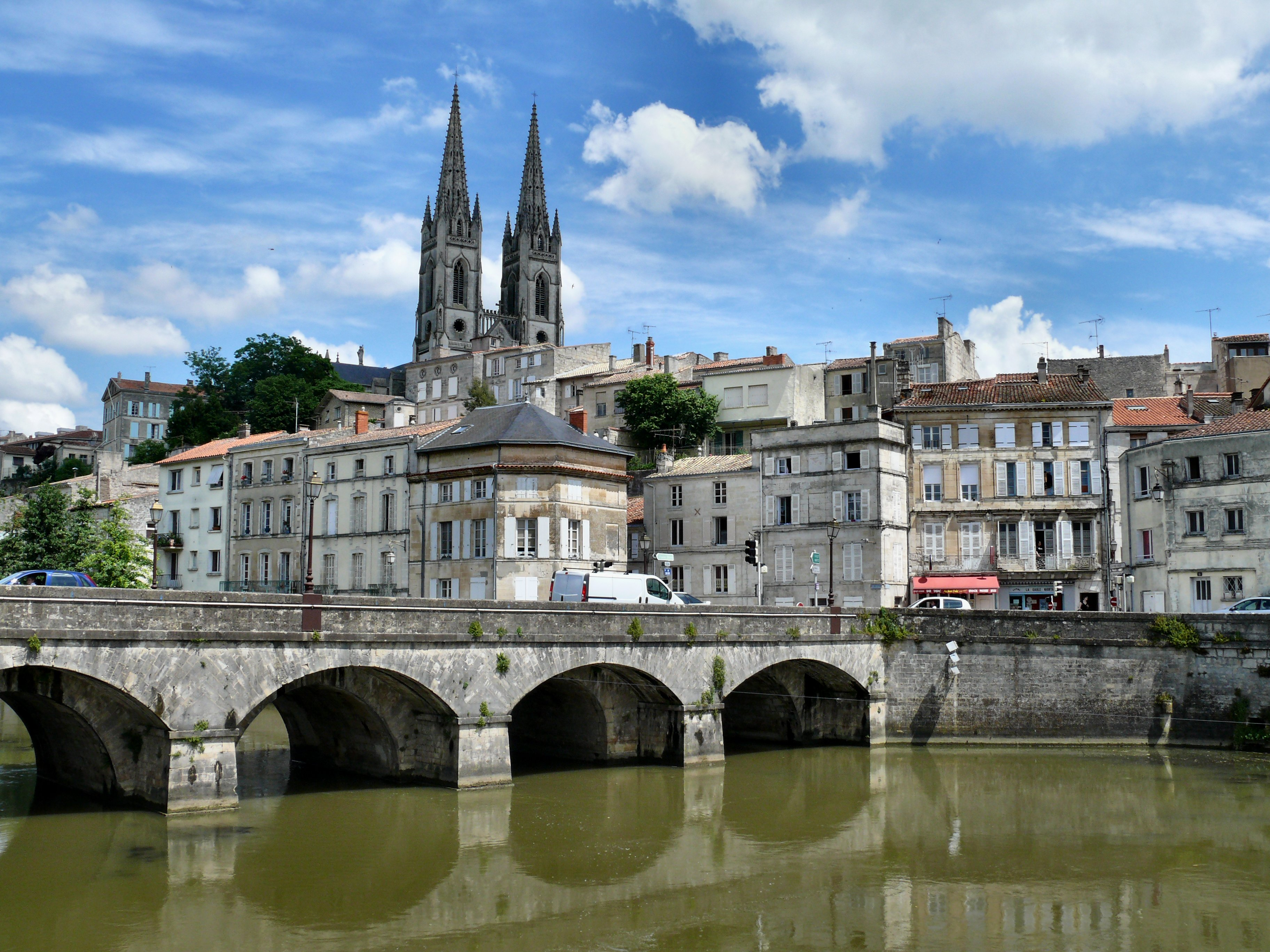
Niort & the Sevre Niortaise

Vendée-Position.svg

== See also ==
- Analysis (English & French)
