= Maigret and the Old People =

1962 novel by Georges Simenon

Maigret and the Old People (French: Maigret et les vieillards) is a 1962 detective novel by the Belgian writer Georges Simenon featuring Jules Maigret of the French Judicial police. It was written in Switzerland in June 1960 and first published by Presses de la Cité on the same year. The 56th in the series, was first translated into English by Robert Eglesfield in 1962 (as Maigret in Society) and by 2018 by Shaun Whiteside. It has over the decades been adapted three times for French television.

== Background ==
Considered one of the best in the canon by Maigret specialists, Simenon began writing what was to become his three-part memoir When I Was Old months after he completed this elegiac novel, which he considered his 180th-something work, at 59.

== Synopsis ==
Maigret is sent by the Director of the Police Judiciaire to investigate the murder of a foreign ministry official retired some twelve years, Comte Armand de Saint-Hilaire. Some tact is required, not so much because of his career but the milieu of minor nobility and old, illustrious families with ancient secrets of their own.
