= Maigret in Court =

1960 novel by Georges Simenon

Maigret in Court (French: Maigret aux assises) is a 1960 detective novel by the Belgian writer Georges Simenon featuring Jules Maigret of the French Judicial police. Written in Switzerland in November 1959 and first published by Presses de la Cité. The 55th of the series, it was translated into English 1961 by Robert Brain and 2018 by Ros Schwartz.

== Synopsis ==
Maigret testifies as a witness at the Assize Court in the case of a man accused of murdering his aunt and the four-year-old in her care. An anoymous call leading to a blood-stained coat in his closet notwithstanding, the evidence is inconclusive. Maigret, never believing in his guilt, continues to investigate unofficially. After a great deal of tailing to and within Toulon, a city in south-eastern France, and Chelles, Seine-et-Marne, a rural suburb of Paris, the denouement—more murder—takes place at a goose farm at the latter. The novel presents a particularly deep treatment of Simenon's major theme of personal responsibility or the lack thereof.

== Gallery ==
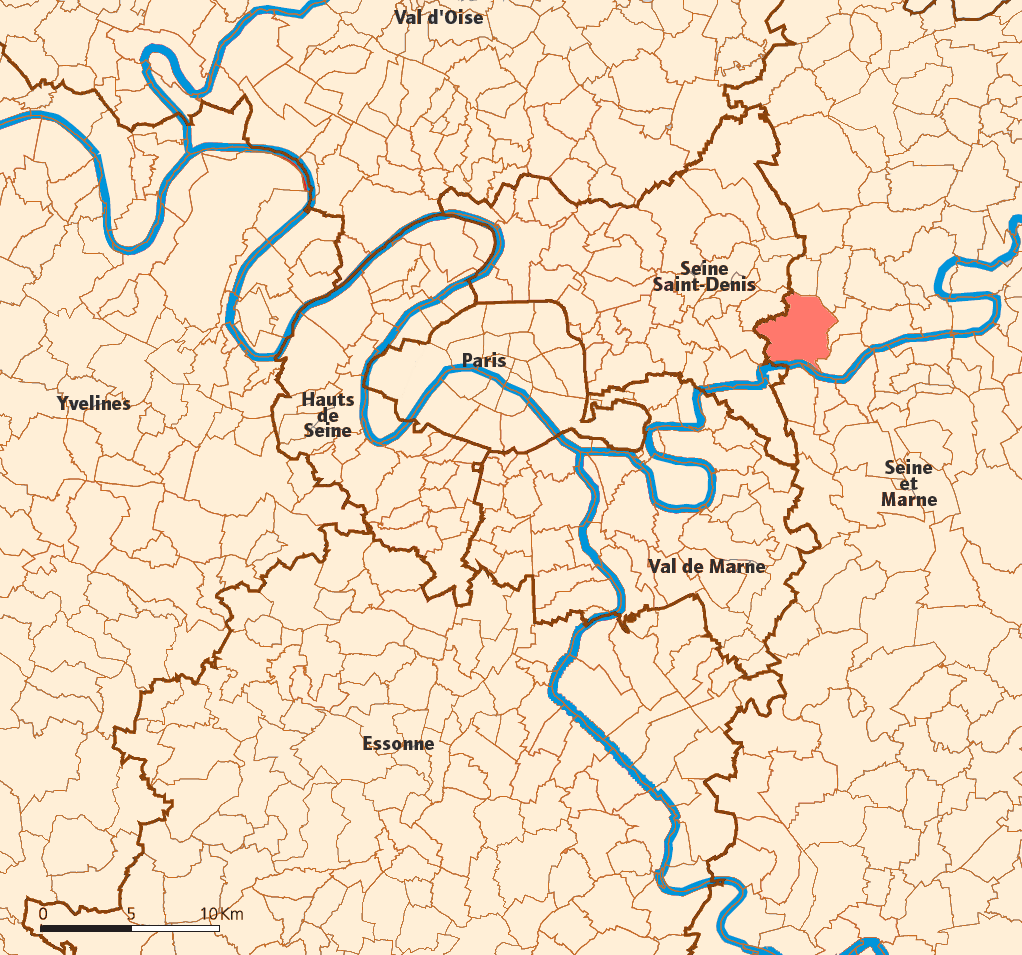
Chelles, an outer suburb of Paris in the Seine-et-Marne department

Occitania administrative region
