= Maigret and the Dead Girl =

Maigret and the Dead Girl (French: Maigret et la jeune morte) is a 1954 detective novel by the Belgian writer Georges Simenon featuring Jules Maigret of the French Judicial police. It was written in Lakeville, Connecticut in January 1954 and first published by Presses de la Cité that same year. The 45th in the series, was first translated into English by Daphne Woodward, and later by Howard Curtis in 2017.

== Synopsis ==
56.40 m^{2} pocket park

The body of an anonymous young girl is found in Place Vintimille (now Place Adolphe-Max]) in Montmartre, her blue evening dress providing the first, sociological clue to her identity. After coming to a jurisdictional understanding with the lacklorn Inspector Lognon they set about identifying the victim – whom the intuitive Maigret comes to know quite well, well enough to know when someone's story is a tad too perfect.

== Adaptations ==
- Maigret and the Lost Life, Basil Sydney, BBC TV, pilot, 4 December 1959
- The Lost Life, Rupert Davies, BBC TV, 15 October 1963
- Maigret en de blauwe avondjurk, Jan Teulings (Dutch), 4 December 1966
- Maigret et la jeune morte, Jean Richard, la 2e chaîne de l'ORTF, 28 December 1973

== See also ==
- French Wikipedia article on Place Adolphe-Max (French)
