= Maigret's Revolver =

1952 detective novel by Georges Simenon

- Author: Georges Simenon
- Original title: Le Revolver de Maigret
- Translator: Nigel Ryan
- Language: French
- Series: Inspector Jules Maigret
- Genre: Detective fiction
- Published: 1956 Hamish Hamilton (UK); 1984 Harcourt (US)
- Media type: Print
- OCLC: 11325763

Maigret's Revolver is a novel by the Belgian writer Georges Simenon. The original French version Le Revolver de Maigret appeared in 1952. The theft of Inspector Jules Maigret's revolver from his home begins a detective story that leads to Maigret travelling from Paris to London to find the young man who stole it, and the woman who is in danger of being his victim.

== Summary ==
An agitated young man visits Maigret's home while he is out, wanting to talk to him, but instead steals his revolver. Maigret and his wife later go to a dinner party of his acquaintance Dr. Pardon, where an expected guest, François Lagrange, a patient of Pardon whose occupation is a mystery, fails to appear. Dr. Pardon visits Lagrange, who seems to have had a shock, and whose son has disappeared. Aware of a possible link between Lagrange and the young man. Maigret visits the agitated Lagrange, learns something of his family and obtains a photograph of his son Alain; on his way out the concierge says that Lagrange had a trunk removed from his apartment the previous night. This is investigated: the trunk, left at the Gare du Nord, contains the body of André Delteil, a lawyer and deputy, well known for exposing scandals. He had been murdered before Maigret's revolver was stolen.

Lagrange is incoherent, and Maigret, wondering if his behaviour is genuine or a pretence, has him taken to the Police Infirmary. The photograph, which Maigret's wife has confirmed is that of the mystery visitor, is circulated. Alain Lagrange has robbed someone of a wallet, threatening with Maigret's revolver, and has come to an apartment block nearby; the concierge says he did not visit anyone, but soon afterwards a resident with suitcases left for the Gare du Nord. This is Jeanne Debul: her maid tells Maigret she has a high-class social life, and François Lagrange regularly visited her. She is on her way to England via Calais.

Maigret, suspecting that Alain Lagrange is following Jeanne Debul with the intention of killing her, travels to London, by air from Le Bourget Airport to Croydon Airport. He has found that Jeanne Debul's destination is the Savoy Hotel, and visits her in her room, but does not find out what business there is between her and François Lagrange. He spends some time in the reception hall waiting for Alain's appearance; detectives from Scotland Yard are also looking out for him. Maigret eventually finds Alain waiting in Jeanne Debul's room while she is out. Treating him to a meal in the hotel restaurant, Maigret learns about Alain's father and recent events at his home; the links between his father, Jeanne Debul and André Delteil become clear.

== Television ==
The story was included in the first series of the BBC television dramatizations of Maigret stories featuring Rupert Davies as the detective: "The Revolver" was broadcast in 1960.
