= Maigret and the Informer =

Novel by Georges Simenon

Maigret and the Informer (French: Maigret et l'indicateur) is a detective novel written by Georges Simenon featuring his iconic character Chief Inspector Maigret of the Judicial Police of France. It was first published in France in June 1971, and is the penultimate book of the Maigret saga, being the 74th. Written in Épalinges, Switzerland, it was first translated into English by Lyn Moir for the Penguin UK edition. (An alternate title is Maigret and the Flea). It marks one of the few times Maigret travels by plane, for he attends the victim's funeral to keep on the pressure.

== Synopsis ==
Maurice Marcia, a gangster gone straight and owner of the tony Sardine restaurant on the Rue Fontaine in the 9th arrondissement of Paris, has been murdered at an unknown location and his body seemingly moved to the Avenue Junot. Inspector Louis, a respected colleague whose beat is the red-light district of Montmartre, gets an anonymous tip. Maigret has more than enough material to work with, not least because the informant—the diminutive "The Flea", as they discover—has gone to ground.

== Reviews ==
Kirkus Reviews dismissed the plot of this late Maigret as "Peu de chose [not much] indeed, a microdab", whereas Fantastic Fiction praised it as "deeply engrossing" given its insights into the class-consciousness of the Parisian elite. Alex Good described it as "a gangster novel with a very dull murder at its heart" arguing that "Simenon doesn’t write action scenes well and because gangsters aren’t very interesting psychological cases to begin with".

== Adaptations ==
Television: Jean Richard, Antenne 2, 9 June 1979.

== Gallery ==
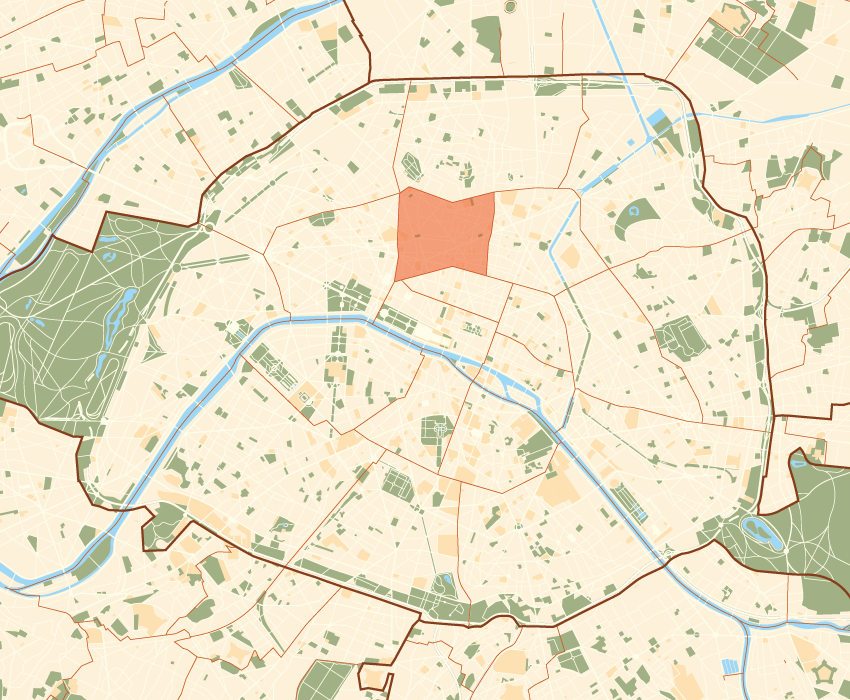
9th arrondissement

Quarters

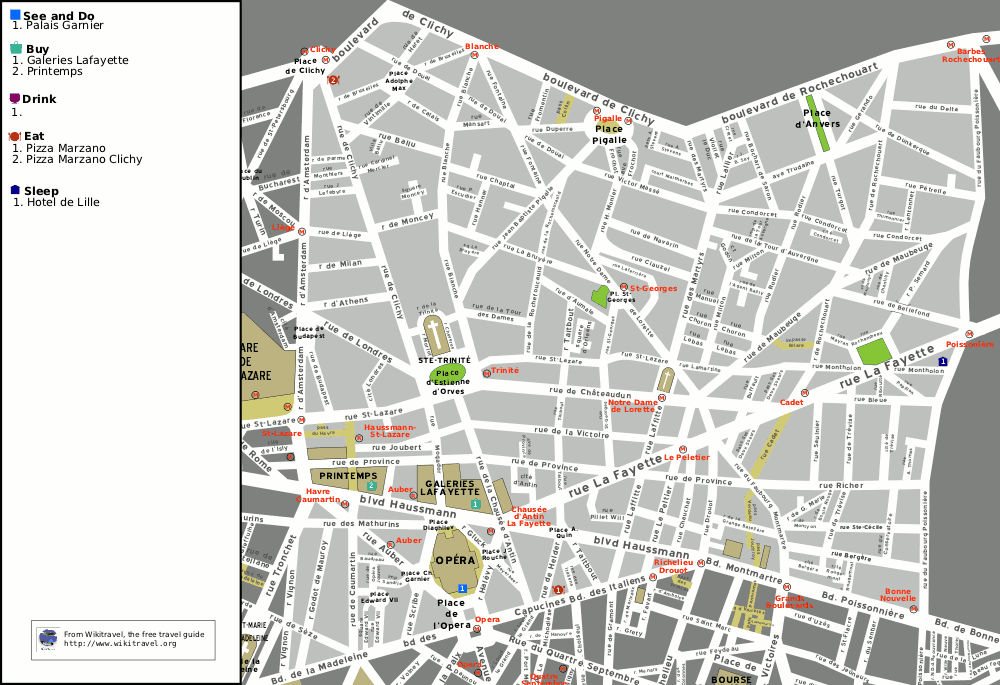
Cultural sites

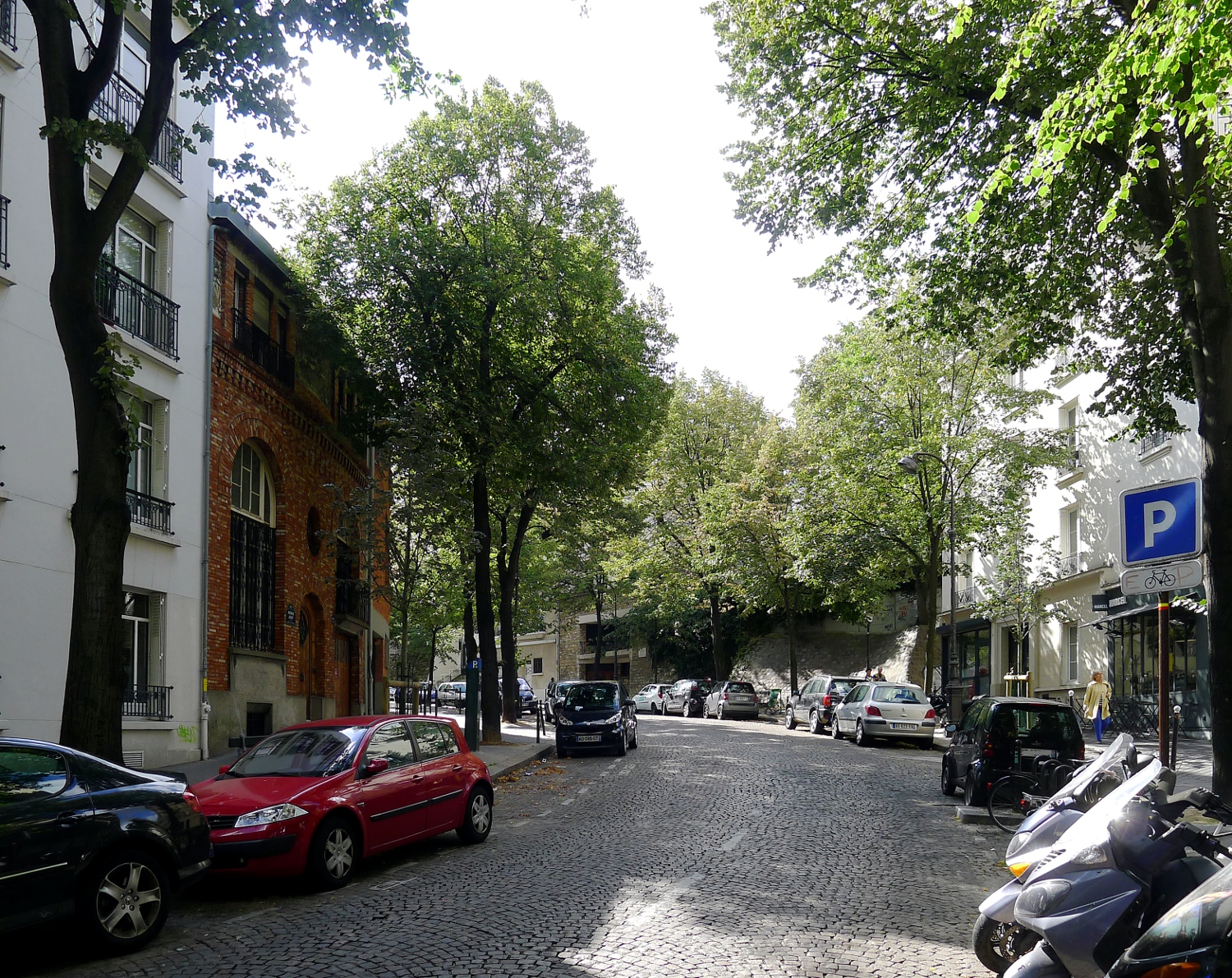
Avenue Junot, September 2011

Rue Fontaine, August 2026
