= Maigret Has Doubts =

1959 novel by Georges Simenon

Maigret Has Doubts (French: Une confidence de Maigret) is a 1959 detective novel by the Belgian writer Georges Simenon featuring Jules Maigret of the French Judicial police. It was written in Switzerland in May 1959 and first published by Presses de la Cité the same year. The 54th in the series, it was first translated into English by Lyn Moir in 1968, and then by David Watson in 2018.

== Synopsis ==
Maigret Maigret and his wife are at a dinner party given by their friends the Pardons. In one of the most stylized novels of the series (with chapters which alternate between the past and present that feature nested narrratives), Maigret reflects on one of more intricate cases.

== See also ==
- Maigret has Doubts review, at Le Figaro (in French)
