= The Anger of Maigret =

1962 novel by Georges Simenon

The Anger of Maigret (French: La colère de Maigret) is a 1962 detective novel by the Belgian writer Georges Simenon featuring Jules Maigret of the French Judicial police. It was written in Echandens, Switzerland June 13-19 1962 and published by Presses de la Cité in June 1962; English translations were published in 1965 by Robert Eglesfield and 2018 by William Hobson, respectively. Maigret Loses His Temper is an alternate Anglosphere title, and it has been adapted into a French telefilm starring Jean Richard.

== Synopsis ==
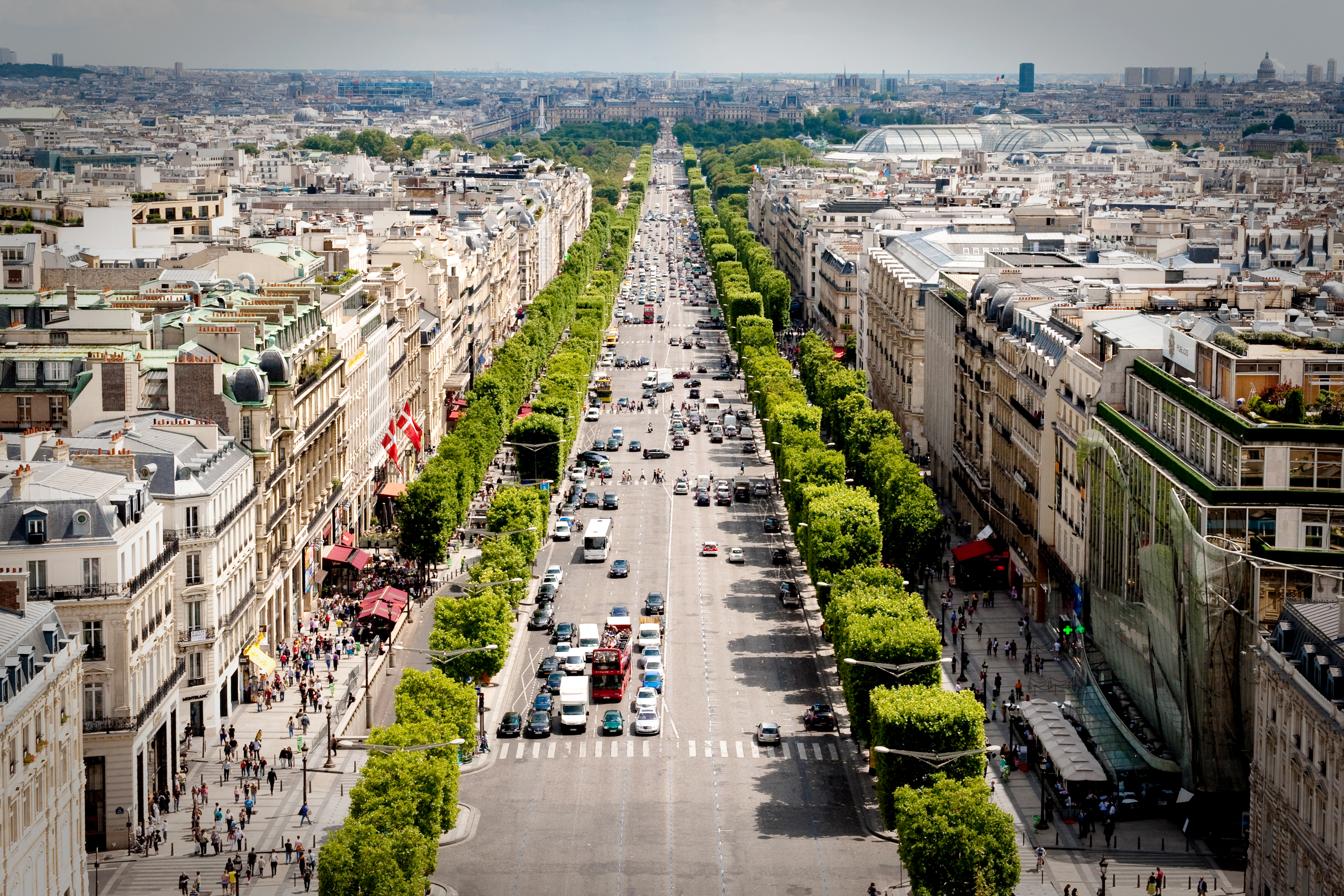
Champs-Élysées

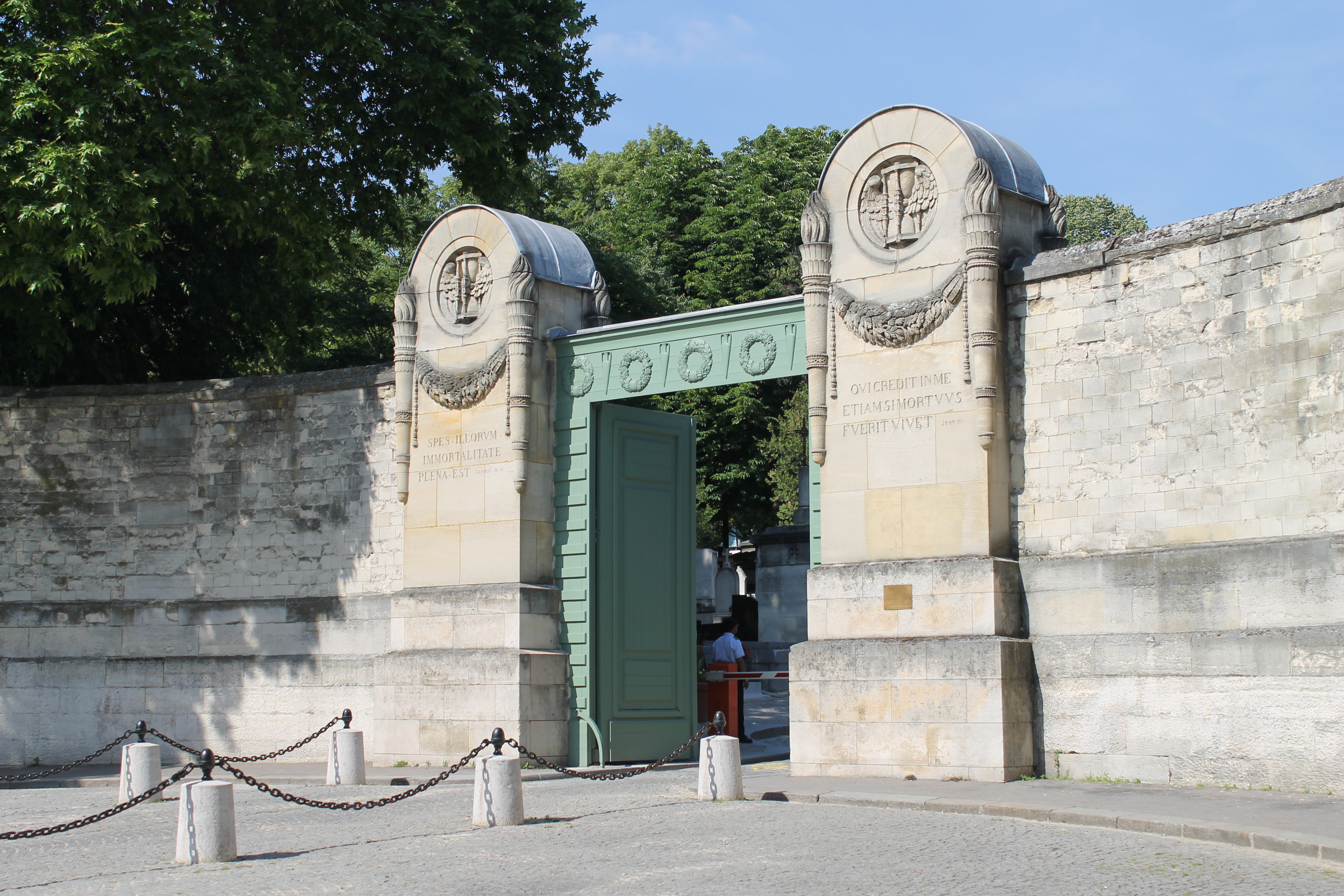
Main gate of the Père-Lachaise Cemetery

During a quiet spell in June Maigret makes acquires a client whose brother-in-law, an owner of nightclubs in Montmartre and on the Champs-Élysées, has gone missing. The nightclubs, business propositions with good back office, have no ties to the underworld. A background which is only confirmed when Émile Boulay's body is found near the Père Lachaise cemetery two days after his strangulation: a firearm was not used, professionals would have immediately dumped it into the Seine, there are no signs of financial fraud, etc. Maigret's theory of the case is that typically the method speaks to the motivation, and the investigation goes smoothly enough until there is unwonted interference...
