= Maigret and the Pickpocket =

1967 novel by Georges Simenon

Maigret and the Pickpocket (French: Le Voleur de Maigret) is a detective novel by the Belgian writer Georges Simenon featuring Jules Maigret of the French Judicial police. It was written in 5–11 November 1966 at Épalinges,Switzerland, and first published by Presses de la Cité in 1967; the 94th in the series, it was first translated into English by Nigel Ryan in 1968. It has also been published in Italian and German, and adopted for French and Italian television (starring Jean Richard and Gino Cervi, respectively).

== Synopsis ==
A pickpocket steals Maigret's wallet and badge on a bus, and promptly returns them after he finds his wife fatally shot in the head. Maigret, as is his wont, soaks in the milieau of the person of interest, and finds one of transactional loyalties. Ricain's tight situation notwithstanding—he had stolen to pay the rent—his friends also work in film, and the richest of the group, a producer, has a strange mistress...

== Gallery ==
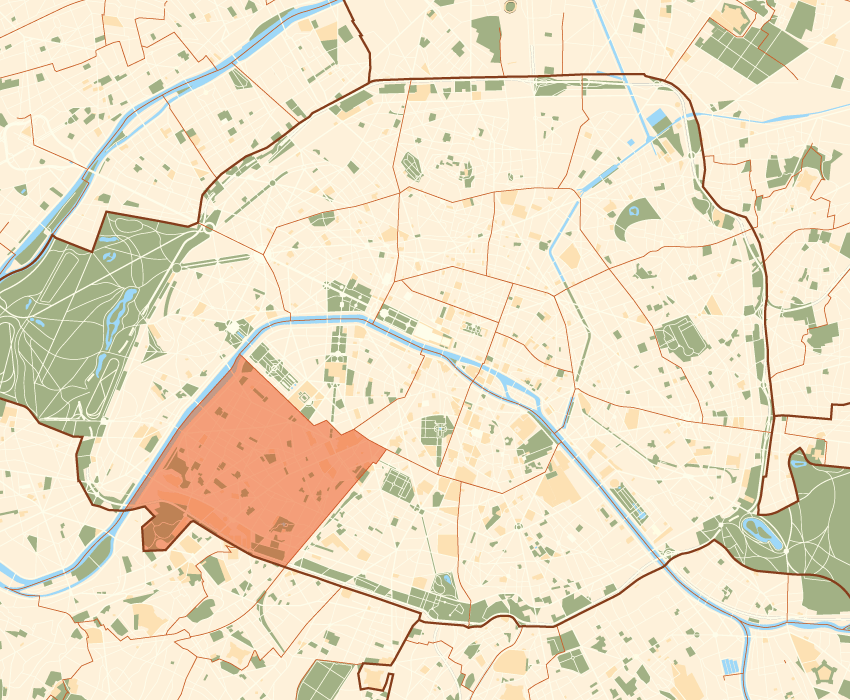
15th arrondissement

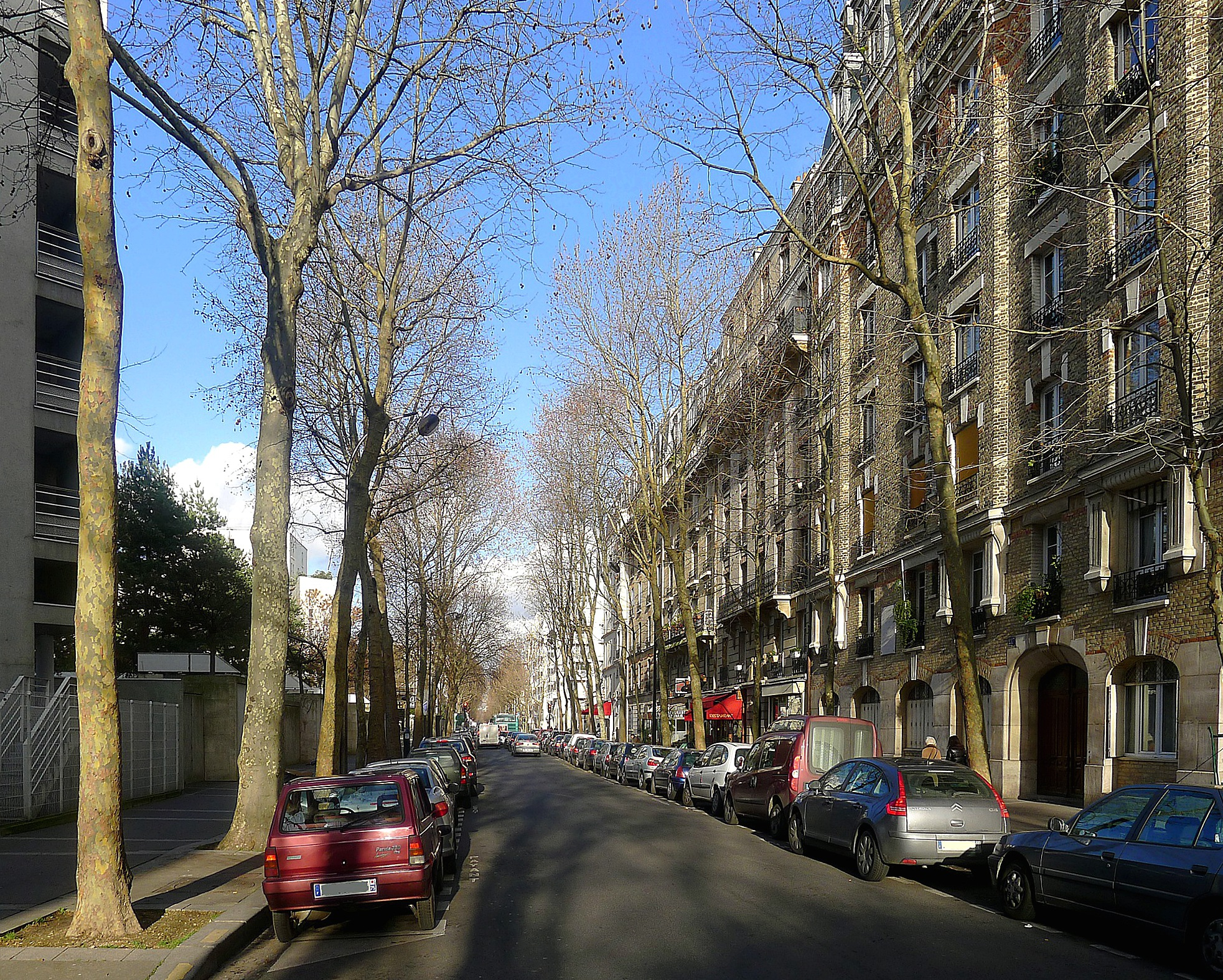
Rue Saint-Charles

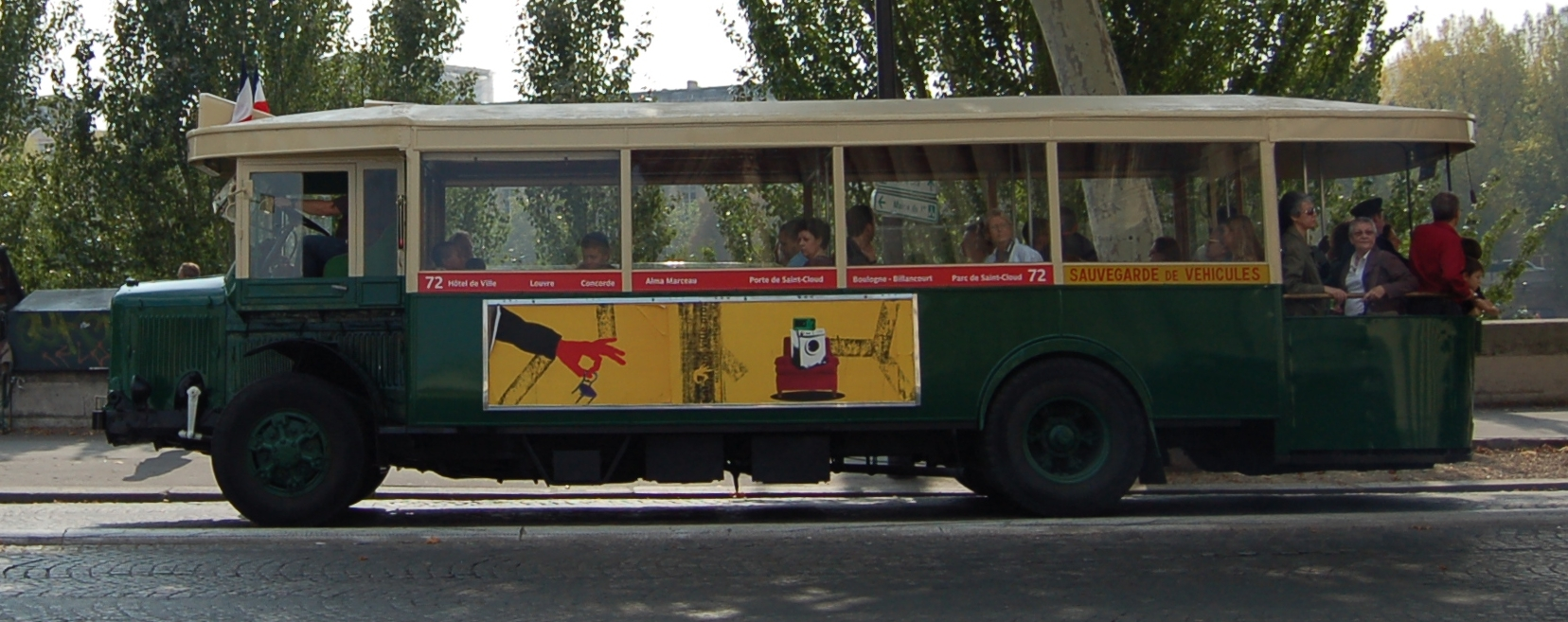
An RATP bus of the era, European Heritage Days 2009
