= Maigret and the Wine Merchant =

1969 novel by Georges Simenon

Maigret and the Wine Merchant (French: (Maigret et le marchand de vin)) is a detective novel by Georges Simenon featuring his iconic character Inspector Maigret of the French Judicial police. Written September 1969 at Épalinges, Switzerland, it was published in France the same month by Presses de la Cité, the 71st in the series. It was published in English, in a translation by Eileen Ellenbogen, by Penguin UK on 5 September 2019.

It has been adopted twice for French television.

== Synopsis ==
Maigret is interrogating a young man who killed his grandmother for petty cash when he is called to the 17th arrondissement to investigate a more serious murder, that of the wine merchant Oscar Chabut, who seemingly went out of his way to be unpleasant everyone, is not deeply mourned by anyone, and slept with most anyone. The investigative leads increase when Chabut's wife—their home was in the opulent Place des Vosges—gives Maigret a long list of these liaisons, but Maigret's scope narrows when he begins receiving notes from someone who has been following the investigation quite closely, so closely that Maigret is sure he has already seen the man. As with the first case, money was instrumental, but unlike it, the crux of the matter is humiliation.

== Gallery ==
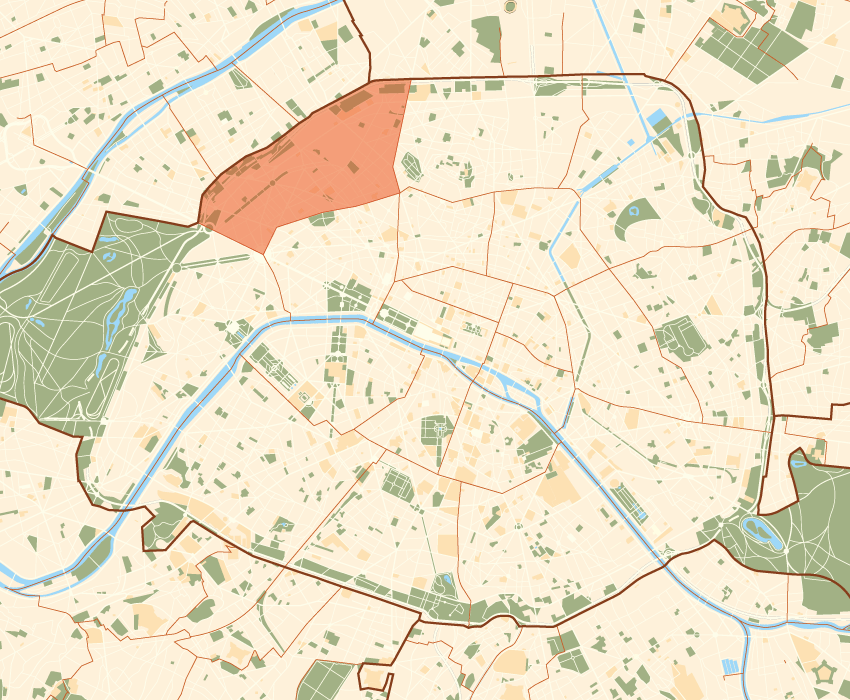
17th arrondissement

Quarters

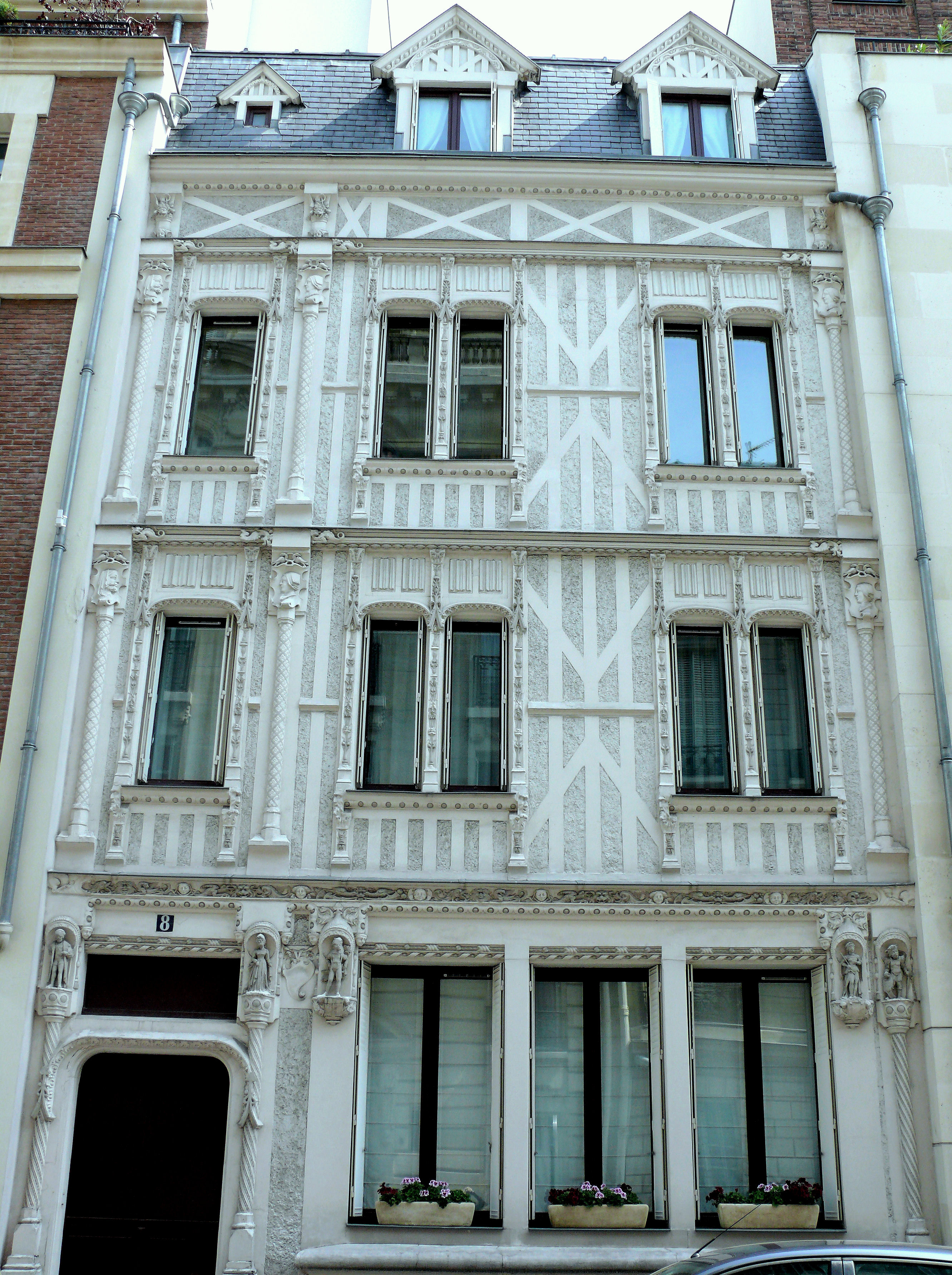
8 Rue Fortuny

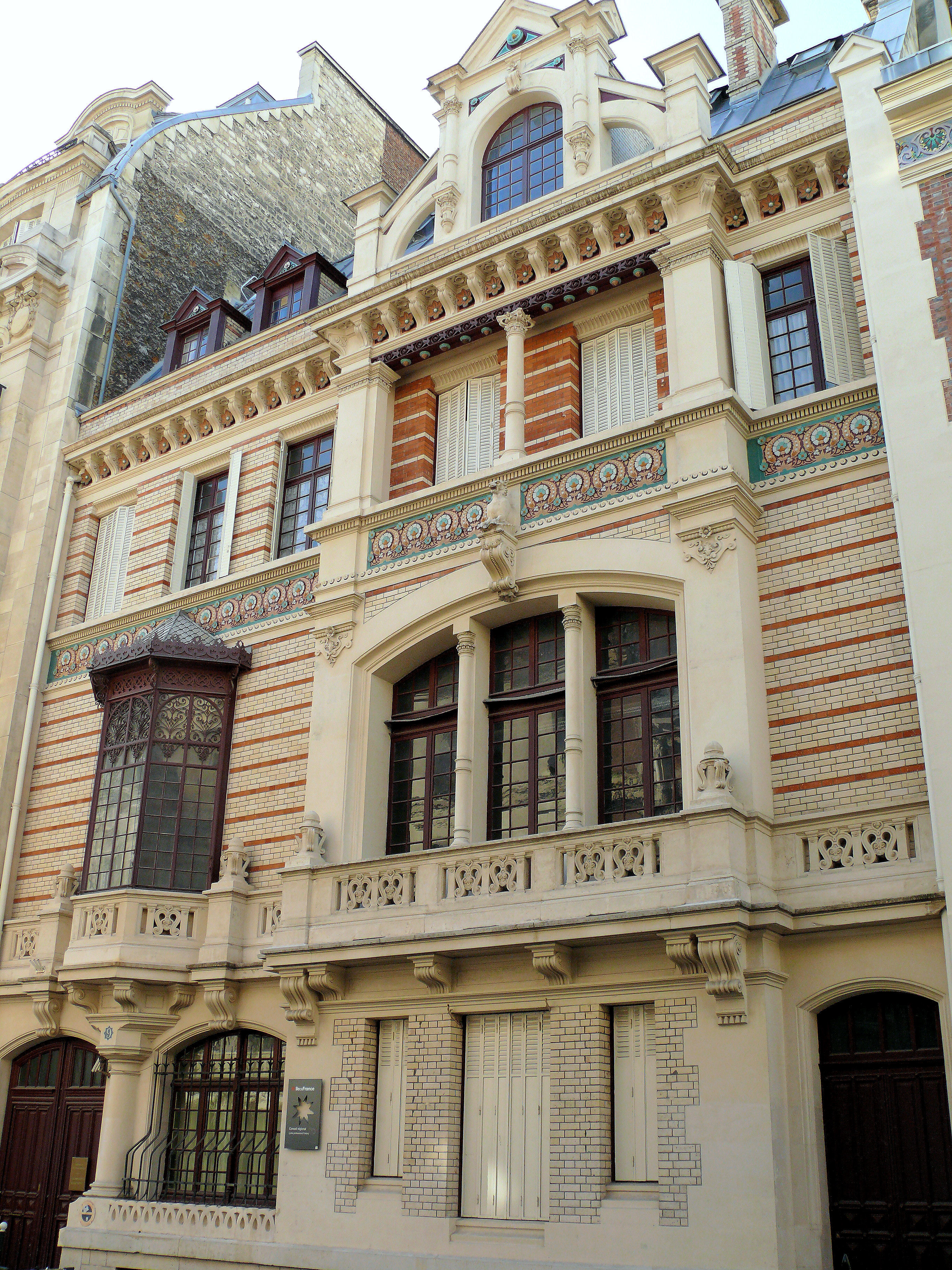
9 Rue Fortuny

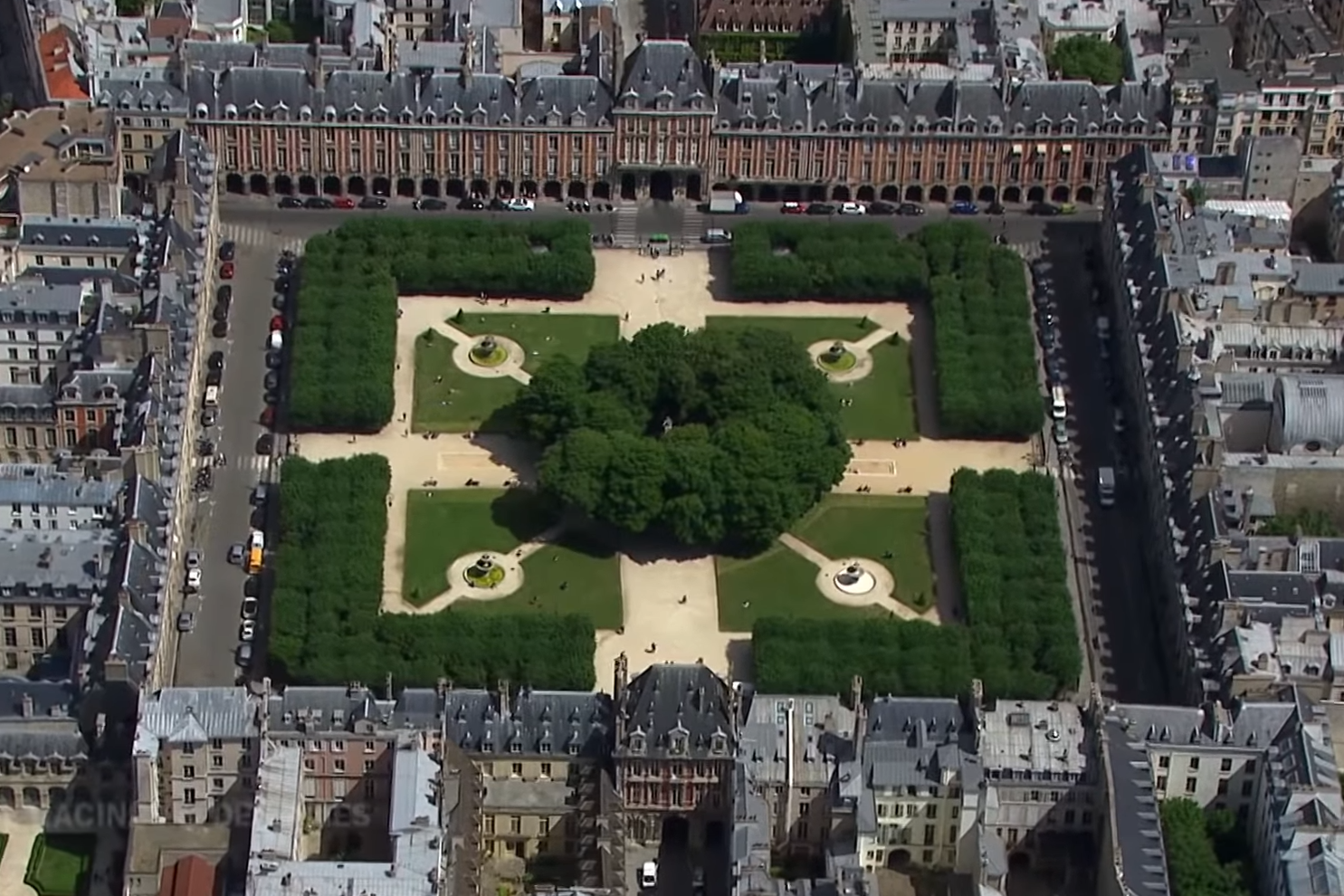
Place des Vosges

== See also ==
- Review (in French)
