= Maigret's Mistake =

1953 novel by Georges Simenon

First edition (publ. Presses de la Cite)

Maigret's Mistake (French:Maigret se trompe) is a 1953 detective novel by the Belgian writer Georges Simenon featuring his character Jules Maigret. It was translated into English in 1954.
