= Maigret and the Dosser =

1963 novel by Georges Simenon

- First edition
- Author: Georges Simenon
- Language: French
- Publisher: Presses de la Cité
- Publication date: 1963
- Pages: 187

Maigret and the Dosser (French: Maigret et le Clochard) is a detective novel by the Belgian writer Georges Simenon featuring his character Jules Maigret.

== Synopsis ==
Maigret investigates the circumstances when a homeless tramp is recovered from the Seine, after being attacked and badly wounded. The tramp proves to be a former doctor, known to fellow tramps as 'The Doc', who abandoned his family twenty years previously to work in Gabon, but returned to Paris to live rough, mainly under various bridges. Thanks to Madame Maigret's sister, who lives in Mulhouse, Maigret learns more of the family background. His wife, estranged but not divorced, is persuaded to visit him in hospital, but displays no affection or interest in a reconciliation.

The tramp, identified as François Keller, was rescued by Jef van Houtte, a Belgian barge owner, and whilst in hospital, refuses to talk. But Maigret suspects that Keller knows his attacker and is keeping quiet for a good reason. He also believes that the Belgian is not telling him the whole story.

Under intense interrogation, whilst van Houtte will not confess Maigret surmises that many years ago he was responsible for the death by drowning of his father-in-law, the former master of the barge, and that Keller was a witness. But Keller still won't say anything, and Maigret is forced to release the Belgian for lack of evidence. Keller returns to his life on the streets, where months later he obliquely confirms Maigret's beliefs.

== Publication history ==
The French title was first published in 1963.

The first English version appeared in 1963, translated by Jean Stewart. This has also been published with the title Maigret and the Bum.
