= Pieter d'Hont =

Dutch sculptor

Pieter D'Hont
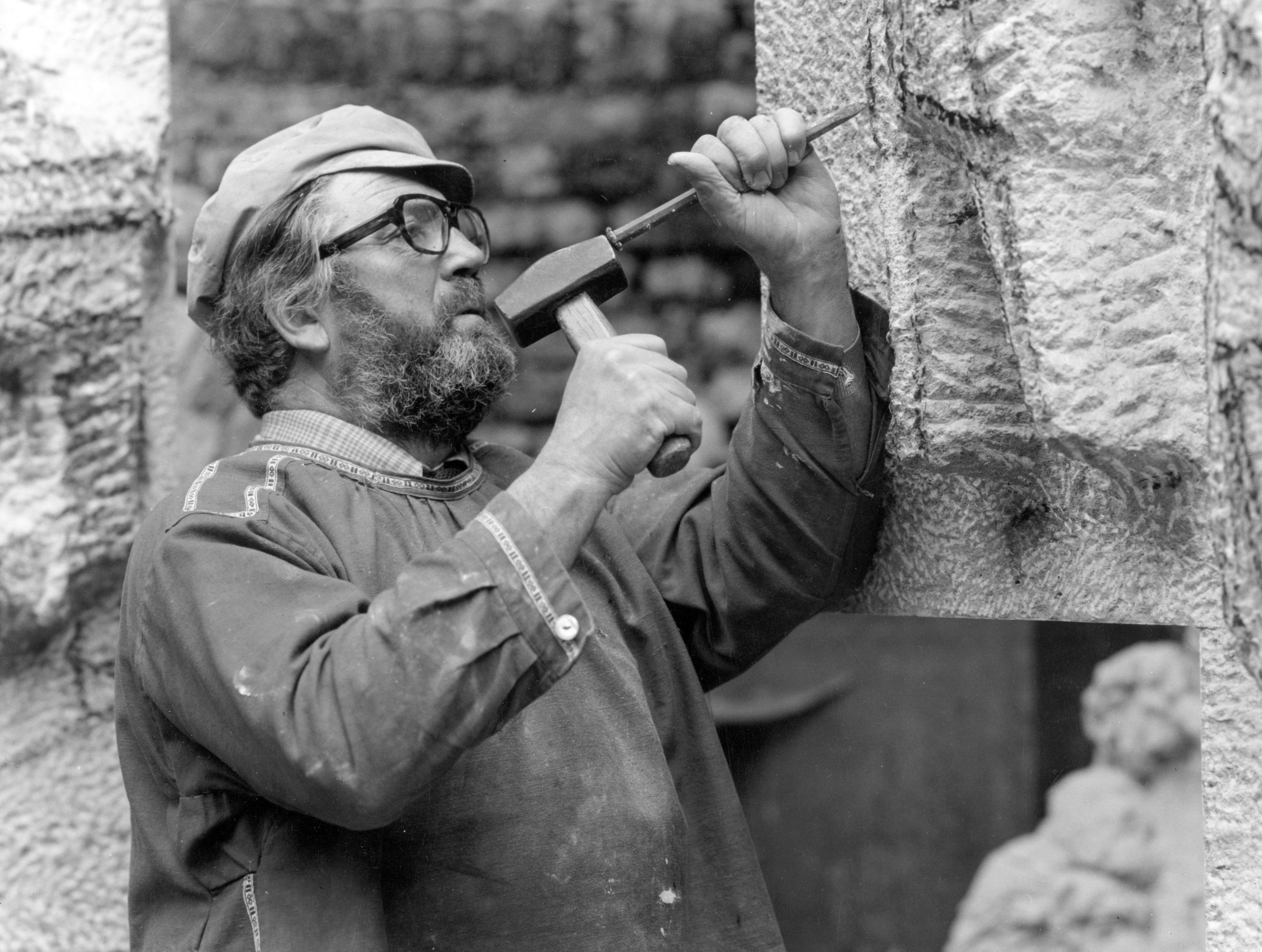
- Born: Pieter Hermanus D'Hont; 24 April 1917; Hilversum, Netherlands
- Died: 12 June 1997 (aged 80); Utrecht, Netherlands
- Known for: Sculpture

Pieter D'Hont (24 April 1917 – 12 June 1997) was a Dutch sculptor.

He studied at the Rijksakademie in Amsterdam. D'Hont designed the statue of the Edison Award for music, named for Thomas Alva Edison, who invented the phonograph. Most of his works are located in Utrecht, Netherlands, including the first statue of Anne Frank. One of his pieces, 'Awakening' can be found in the grounds of Tilburg University.

== Gallery ==
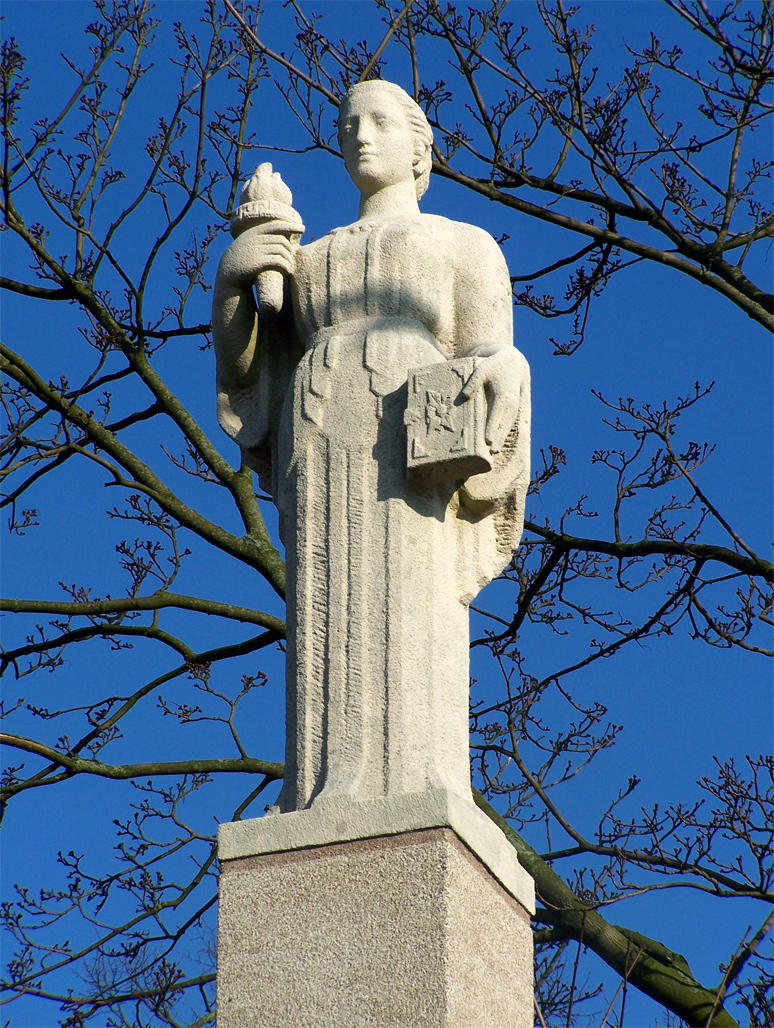
Symbol of Wisdom (1943) in Utrecht, Netherlands

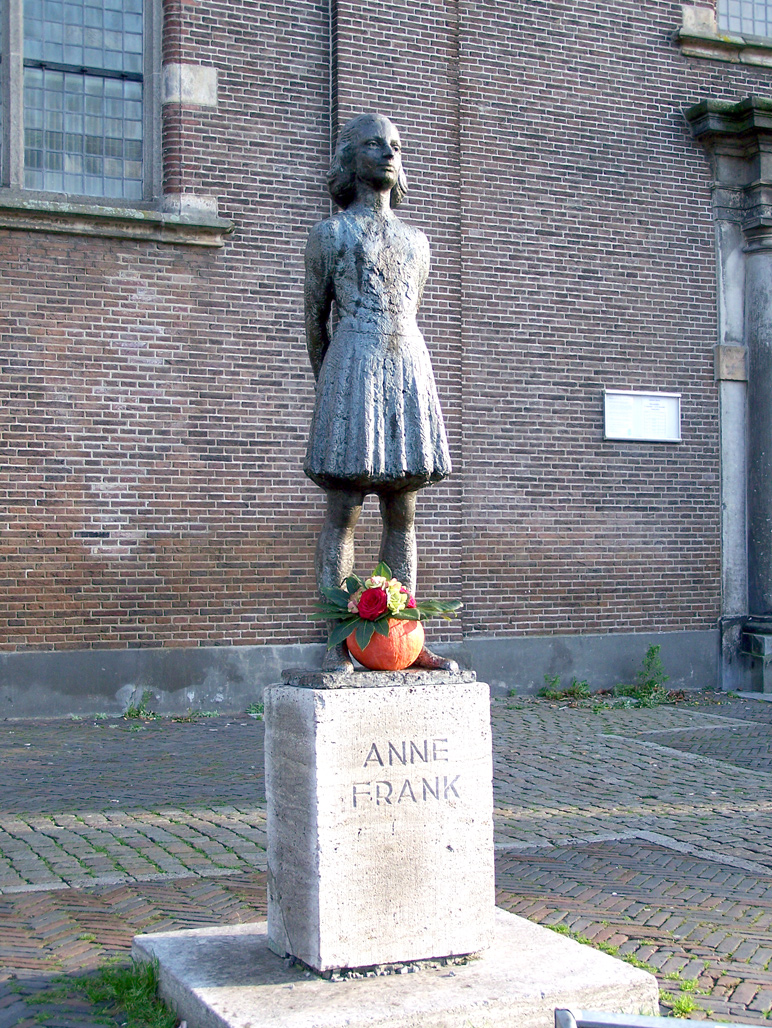
Anne Frank (1960) in Utrecht, Netherlands

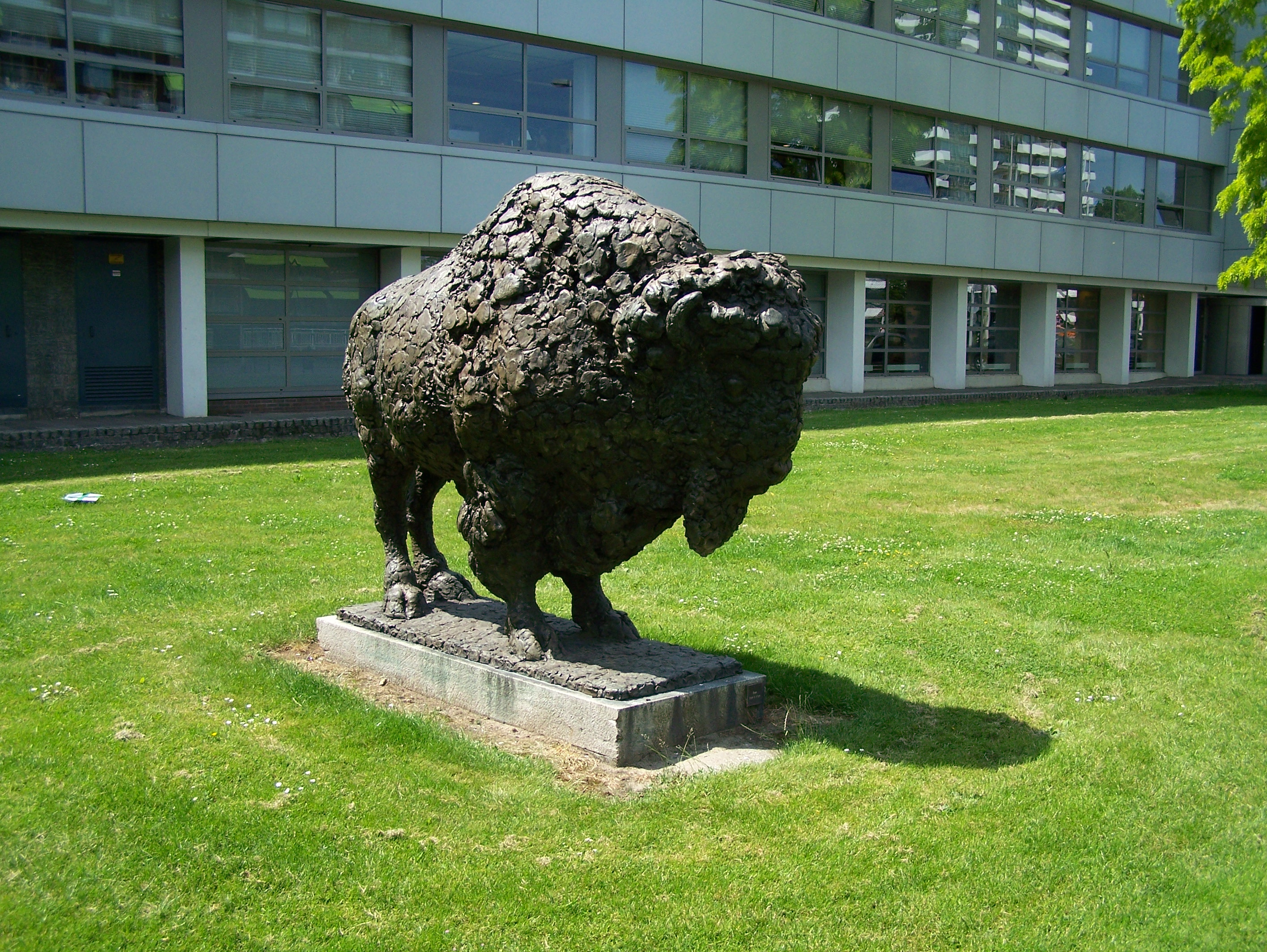
Bison (1968) in Utrecht, Netherlands
