= Maigret in Vichy =

1967 novel by Georges Simenon

Maigret in Vichy (French: Maigret à Vichy) is a 1967 detective novel by the Belgian writer Georges Simenon featuring Jules Maigret of the French Judicial police. It was inspired by a summer family vacation, and is the 68th of the series. Written in Épalinges,Switzerland 5-11 September 1967, it was published by Presses de la Cité in 19 January 1968, and translated by Eileen Ellenbogen into English circa 1969.It has also been translated into German and Italian, and a French teleplay has been made starring Jean Richard.

== Synopsis ==
On his physician's advice Maigret takes a well-deserved vacation. He and his wife take the waters in Vichy and casually socialize until one of their fellow tourists (whom they only know by sight) is found strangled near their hotel. A former colleague investigates, and Maigret consults. A peculiar bond between two sisters involving a novel method of child support proves to be the crux of the matter.

== Gallery ==
Department of Allier

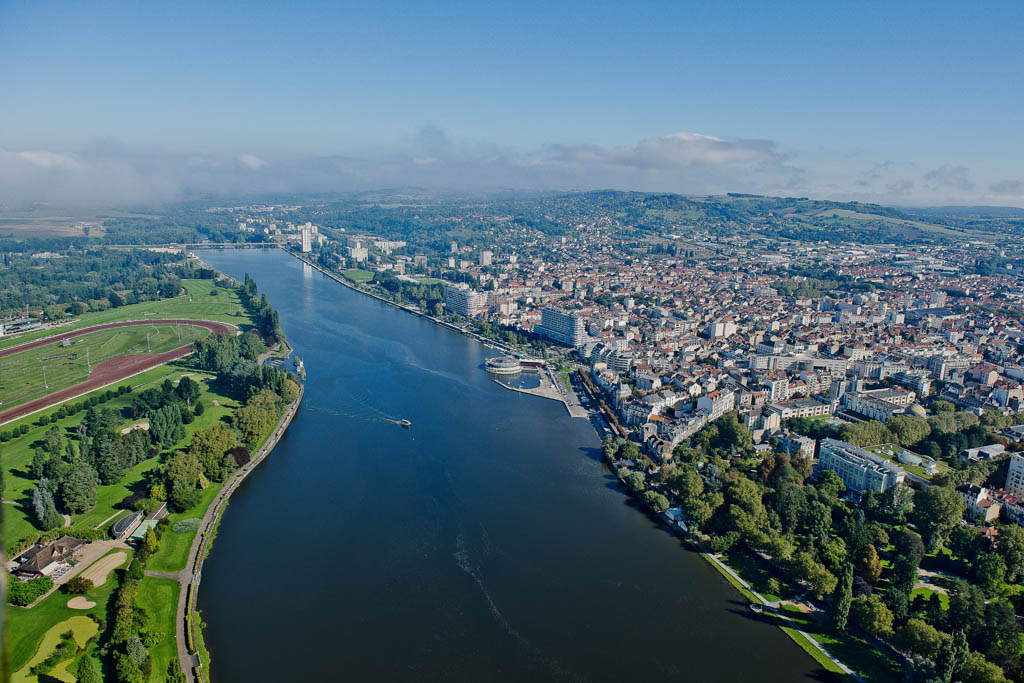
Vichy in 2013

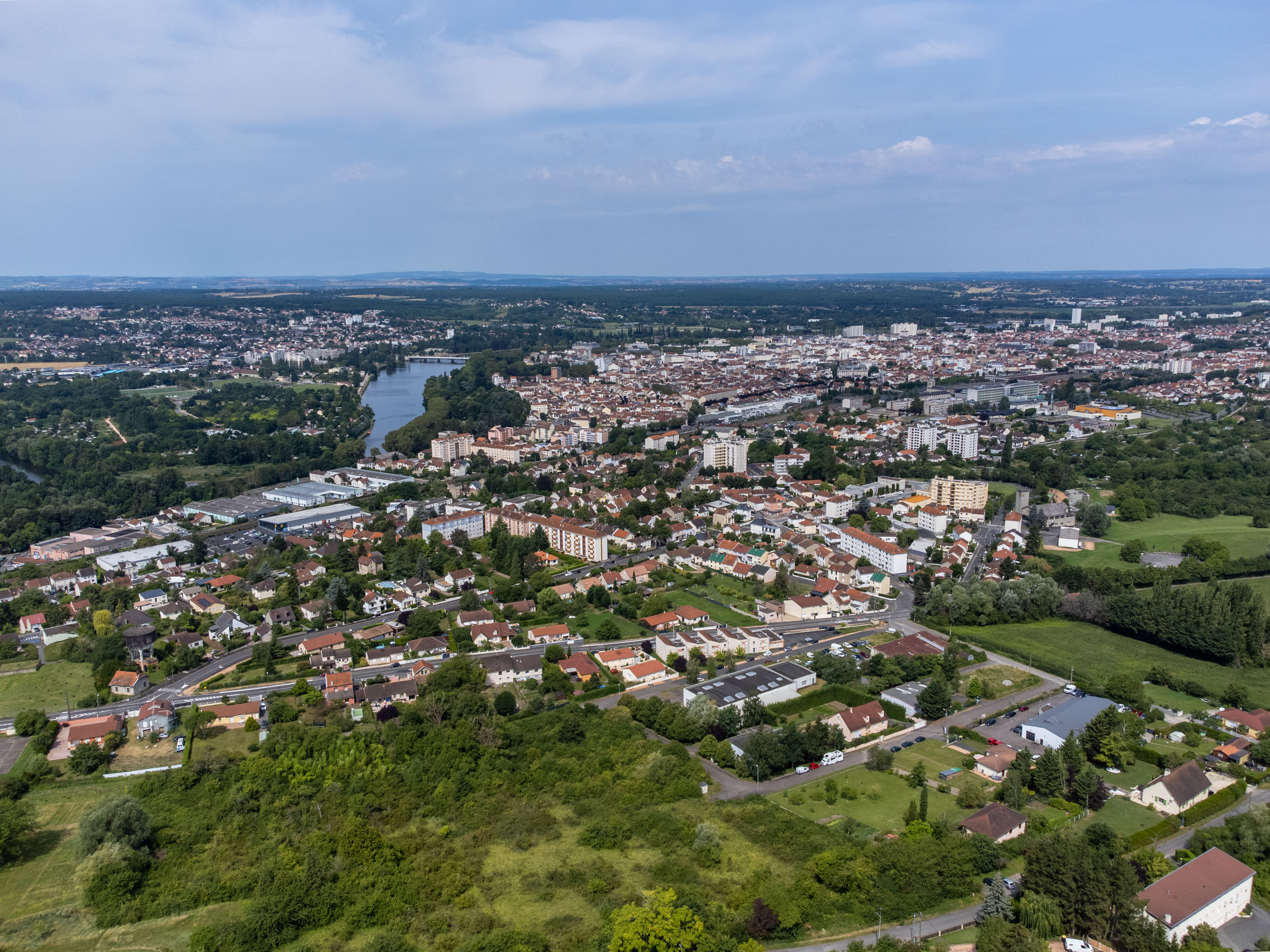
Vichy in 2023

== See also ==
- Spa town
- Great Spa Towns of Europe
