= My Friend Maigret =

1949 novel by Georges Simenon

- Author: Georges Simenon
- Original title: French: Mon ami Maigret
- Translator: Shaun Whiteside
- Language: French
- Publication date: 1949

My Friend Maigret (French: Mon ami Maigret) is a 1949 detective novel by the Belgian writer Georges Simenon featuring his character Jules Maigret. The book was translated into English by Shaun Whiteside. H.R.F. Keating included the novel in his list of "100 Best Crime and Mystery Books".
