= Maigret (1960 TV series) =

British TV drama series (1959–1963)

- Genre: Crime drama
- Created by: Georges Simenon
- Written by: Giles Cooper (19 episodes) and 9 others
- Starring: Rupert Davies; Ewen Solon; Neville Jason; Helen Shingler
- Theme music composer: Ron Grainer
- Opening theme: The Maigret Theme
- Country of origin: United Kingdom
- Original language: English
- No. of series: 4
- No. of episodes: 52, (plus a pilot episode in 1959)

Production
- Executive producer: Andrew Osborn
- Running time: 50 minutes
- Production company: BBC

Original release
- Network: BBC TV
- Release: 12 April 1959 – 24 December 1963

Maigret is a British television series made by the BBC and which – following a pilot episode broadcast in 1959 – ran for 52 episodes from 1960 to 1963.

Based on the Maigret stories of Georges Simenon, the series starred Rupert Davies in the title role.

Unlike most BBC series produced in the 1960s, all episodes (bar the pilot) have survived intact, and are available as a complete set on DVD and Blu-ray.

In 2022 the series was broadcast by UK television channel Talking Pictures TV, and is periodically repeated.

== Cast ==
=== Main ===
- Rupert Davies as Police Judiciaire detective Commissaire Jules Maigret
- Ewen Solon as Lucas
- Neville Jason as Lapointe
- Victor Lucas as Torrence
- Helen Shingler as Madame Maigret

=== Guests ===
- Terence Alexander
- George Baker as Dominic Pere
- Peter Barkworth as Sergeant
- Derek Benfield as Emile
- Peter Blythe
- Wilfrid Brambell as Jacob
- John Carson
- Leon Cortez as Lapie
- Diana Coupland as Jo
- Roger Delgado as Pepito/as Fouché
- Madge Ryan as Madame Machére
- Maurice Denham ag Tiburce de St. Hilaire
- Paul Eddington as Harry Brown
- Barry Foster
- William Franklyn
- Michael Goodliffe as Dr Javet
- Marius Goring as Peter the Lett
- Patricia Hayes as Didine Gulot
- Stratford Johns as Keller/ as Philippe Natali
- Philip Madoc
- Magda Miller
- Warren Mitchell as Aristide
- Penny Morrell
- Pete Murray as Philippe
- John Nettleton
- Nanette Newman as Odette
- Henry Oscar as Inspector Lognon
- Redmond Phillips
- Peter Sallis
- Patrick Troughton as Gaston Meurant

Rupert Davies took up the role as the Police Judiciaire detective Commissaire Jules Maigret in 1960, after Basil Sydney, who had played Maigret in the pilot episode, was unable to continue.

Although staying largely true to the storyline of the books, the series featured only three of Maigret's team of detectives (the "faithful four"), omitting any casting for Janvier, although the character is mentioned in several episodes.

Rupert Davies

The choice of Davies to play Maigret was enthusiastically approved by Simenon himself. Remembering the role in a 1964 interview Davies said "When Andrew Osborn, the producer of the show, offered me the part on Good Friday in 1960, I knew very little about Maigret. I knew he was a famous French fictional detective, but that was all." Rather than read the books to get the feel for the character, Davies thought it would be better to meet Maigret's creator and hear from him how he saw the character. The BBC agreed and a meeting was arranged between Davies and Simenon in Lausanne.

"The moment Simenon saw me he shouted: "C'est Maigret, c'est Maigret. You are the flesh and bones of Maigret!" Davies later remembered. "That was a wonderful beginning. Then he drove us to his lovely château in the village of Échandens, where I met his wife. Later he began to coach me in Maigret's idiosyncrasies."

Simenon himself said of Davies "At last, I have found the perfect Maigret!"

== Production ==
The series was written by a set of ten writers, each contributing individual episodes; the most prolific being Giles Cooper, credited with nineteen episodes, and Roger East, with twelve.

Directing was similarly shared by sixteen directors, with Gerard Glaister and Terence Williams responsible for eight each, Andrew Osborn seven, and Eric Tayler six. Each episode was shot in black-and-white and lasted 50 minutes, and (as it was made for the BBC) was intended to be screened without commercial breaks. It was shot mainly in studio, though many of the exteriors were filmed on location in Paris. Interior set designer Eileen Diss spent months scouring France for French items to be used on set, including furniture, ornaments, posters, and cigarette packets; she noted in a 1961 interview that, "Half these things may never be in sharp focus on the screen. But when in a close-up you see a terribly French door-knob behind someone's left ear, it does make just that much extra difference."

Series costar Ewen Solon broke his leg in a stunt while jumping from a wall. Subsequent scripts had to be rewritten to account for the obvious damage which could not be hidden or shot around.

Theme music and various incidental music was composed by Ron Grainer for which he won an Ivor Novello award. Furthermore, Rupert Davies won the British Academy Television Award for Best Actor in 1962, while Eileen Diss won the British Academy Television Award for Best Design in 1963. Apart from the pilot, all 52 episodes remain within the BBC's archives.

Davies would reprise the role of Maigret in introductions to each episode of the first series of the 1964 crime anthology series Detective.

On Sunday, 9 February 1969, BBC One London aired Maigret at Bay as part of its series BBC Play of the Month. This feature-length movie was based on the 1964 novel Maigret Defends Himself (Maigret se défend), and featured Rupert Davies, Helen Shingler, and Neville Jason reprising their series roles of Commissaire Maigret, Madame Maigret, and Lapointe, respectively.

== Series overview ==
Series	Episodes	Originally released	
Series	Episodes	First released	Last released
1	14	12 April 1959	23 January 1961
2	13	23 October 1961	15 January 1962
3	13	24 September 1962	17 December 1962
4	13	1 October 1963	24 December 1963

== Episodes ==
=== Series 1 (1959-61) ===
No. overall	No. in series	Title	Directed by	Written by	Based on	BBC airdate
Pilot	Pilot	"Maigret and the Lost Life"	Gilchrist Calder	Giles Cooper	Maigret and the Dead Girl (1954 novel)	12 April 1959
Starring Basil Sydney as Maigret
1	1	"Murder in Montmartre"	Andrew Osborn	Giles Cooper	Inspector Maigret and the Strangled Stripper (1950 novel)	31 October 1960
Rupert Davies takes over as Maigret
2	2	"Unscheduled Departure"	Eric Tayler	Giles Cooper	Maigret Has Scruples (1958 novel)	7 November 1960
3	3	"The Burglar's Wife"	Julian Amyes	Roger Burford	Maigret and the Burglar's Wife (1951 novel)	14 November 1960
4	4	"The Revolver"	Chloe Gibson	Roger Burford	Maigret's Revolver (1952 novel)	21 November 1960
5	5	"The Old Lady"	Eric Tayler	Margot Bennett	Maigret and the Old Lady (1950 novel)	28 November 1960
6	6	"Liberty Bar"	Andrew Osborn	Margot Bennett	Liberty Bar (1932 novel)	5 December 1960
7	7	"A Man of Quality"	Gerard Glaister	Giles Cooper	The Death of Monsieur Gallet (1931 novel)	12 December 1960
8	8	"My Friend the Inspector"	Eric Tayler	Margot Bennett	My Friend Maigret (1949 novel)	19 December 1960
9	9	"The Mistake"	Andrew Osborn	Roger Burford	Maigret's Mistake (1953 novel)	26 December 1960
10	10	"On Holiday"	Eric Tayler	Margot Bennett	A Summer Holiday (1948 novel)	2 January 1961
11	11	"The Experts"	Andrew Osborn	Giles Cooper	Inspector Maigret and the Killers (1952 novel)	9 January 1961
12	12	"The Cactus"	Eric Tayler	Roger Burford	Maigret Takes a Room (1951 novel)	16 January 1961
13	13	"The Children's Party"	Gerard Glaister	Giles Cooper	The Crime of Inspector Maigret (1931 novel)	23 January 1961

=== Series 2 (1961-62) ===
No. overall	No. in series	Title	Directed by	Written by	Based on	BBC airdate
14	1	"Shadow Play"	John Harrison	Giles Cooper	The Shadow in the Courtyard (1932 novel)	23 October 1961
15	2	"The Simple Case"	Gerard Glaister	Roger Burford	Maigret and the Headless Corpse (1955 novel)	30 October 1961
16	3	"Death of a Butcher"	Andrew Osborn	Giles Cooper	Maigret's Failure (1956 novel)	6 November 1961
17	4	"The Winning Ticket"	Harold Clayton	Giles Cooper	Maigret's Dead Man (1948 novel)	13 November 1961
18	5	"Inspector Lognon's Triumph"	John Harrison	Giles Cooper	"Maigret and the Surly Inspector" (1946 short story)	20 November 1961
19	6	"The Lost Sailor"	Gerard Glaister	Margot Bennett	Death of a Harbour Master (1932 novel)	27 November 1961
20	7	"The Golden Fleece"	Rudolph Cartier	Giles Cooper	The Lock at Charenton (1933 novel)	4 December 1961
21	8	"Raise Your Right Hand"	Andrew Osborn	Roger Burford	Maigret in Court (1960 novel)	11 December 1961
22	9	"The Liars"	Rudolph Cartier	Vincent Tilsley	Maigret Goes to School (1954 novel)	18 December 1961
23	10	"A Crime for Christmas"	Campbell Logan	Margot Bennett	"Maigret's Christmas" (1950 short story)	26 December 1961
24	11	"The Reluctant Witnesses"	Gerard Glaister	Donald Bull	Maigret and the Reluctant Witnesses (1959 novel)	1 January 1962
25	12	"The White Hat"	Gerard Glaister	Roger Burford	Madame Maigret's Own Case (1950 novel)	8 January 1962
26	13	"Murder on Monday"	Terence Williams	Giles Cooper	Maigret and the Man on the Boulevard (1953 novel)	15 January 1962

=== Series 3 (1962) ===
No. overall	No. in series	Title	Directed by	Written by	Based on	BBC airdate
27	1	"Voices from the Past"	Gerard Glaister	Giles Cooper	Maigret in Society (1960 novel)	24 September 1962
Count Armand de Saint-Hilaire is found dead with four bullet holes at home. While investigating the death, Maigret finds out that the Count had written a letter every day to his unrequited love, whose own husband just passed away. The mystery deepens because the Count's housekeeper refuses to answer any question.
28	2	"The Madman of Vervac"	Andrew Osborn	Roger Burford	The Madman of Bergerac (1932 novel)	1 October 1962
29	3	"The Countess"	Andrew Osborn	Roger Burford	Maigret and the Countess (1932 novel)	8 October 1962
30	4	"The Wedding Guest"	Terence Williams	Giles Cooper	Guinguette by the Seine (1931 novel)	15 October 1962
31	5	"High Politics"	Andrew Osborn	Roger Burford	Maigret and the Minister (1954 novel)	22 October 1962
32	6	"Love from Felicie"	Andrew Osborn	Giles Cooper	Maigret and the Toy Village (1944 novel)	29 October 1962
33	7	"The Dirty House"	Terence Williams	Giles Cooper	Maigret in Retirement (1947 novel)	5 November 1962
34	8	"The Crystal Ball"	John Harrison	Roger Burford	To Any Lengths (1944 novel)	12 November 1962
35	9	"The Crooked Castle"	Andrew Osborn	Donald Bull	Maigret at the Crossroads (1931 novel)	19 November 1962
36	10	"Death in Mind"	John Elliot	Giles Cooper, John Elliot	A Battle of Nerves (1931 novel)	26 November 1962
37	11	"Seven Little Crosses"	Gerard Glaister	Giles Cooper	"Sept petites croix dans un carnet"	3 December 1962
Adapted from a non-Maigret short story included in the 1951 collection Maigret's Christmas (Un Noël de Maigret).
38	12	"The Trap"	Terence Williams	Margot Bennett	Maigret Sets a Trap (1955 novel)	10 December 1962
39	13	"The Amateurs"	Terence Williams	Donald Bull	Maigret and the Lazy Burglar (1961 novel)	17 December 1962

=== Series 4 (1963) ===
No. overall	No. in series	Title	Directed by	Written by	Based on	BBC airdate
40	1	"Poor Cecile"	Michael Hayes	Donald Bull	Maigret and the Spinster (1940 novel)	1 October 1963
41	2	"The Fontenay Murders"	Alan Bridges	Elaine Morgan	Maigret Afraid (1953 novel)	8 October 1963
42	3	"The Lost Life"	Gilchrist Calder	Giles Cooper	Maigret and the Dead Girl (1954 novel)	15 October 1963
Remake of 1959 pilot
43	4	"The Cellars of the Majestic"	Eric Tayler	Anthony Steven	Maigret and the Hotel Majestic (1939 novel)	22 October 1963
44	5	"A Man Condemned"	Terence Williams	Roger Burford	Maigret has Doubts (1959 novel)	29 October 1963
45	6	"The Flemish Shop"	Eric Tayler	Rex Tucker	The Flemish Shop (1932 novel)	5 November 1963
46	7	"A Taste of Power"	Terence Williams	Donald Bull	Maigret's First Case (1949 novel)	12 November 1963
47	8	"The Log of the Cap Fagnet"	Michael Hayes	Elaine Morgan	The Sailors' Rendezvous (1931 novel)	19 November 1963
48	9	"The Judge's House"	Terence Dudley	Elaine Morgan	Maigret in Exile (1940 novel)	26 November 1963
49	10	"Another World"	Michael Hayes	Donald Bull	Maigret and the Millionaires (1957 novel)	3 December 1963
50	11	"The Crime at Lock 14"	Andrew Osborn	Anthony Coburn	The Crime at Lock 14 (1931 novel)	10 December 1963
51	12	"Peter the Lett"	Rudolph Cartier	Giles Cooper	The Strange Case of Peter the Lett (1931 novel)	17 December 1963
52	13	"Maigret's Little Joke"	Terence Williams	Donald Bull	Maigret's Little Joke (1957 novel)	24 December 1963

== Home media ==
In May 2021, Network Distributing announced the Blu-Ray release of the series (to be released August 2021), with a DVD release soon to follow.

The DVD set of 14 discs does not include the booklet found in the Blu-Ray edition. Sleeve notes inform that the series has been "remastered from original film elements", most likely meaning Kinescope films as distributed world-wide, "original fullscreen TV format".

In 2023, Kino Lorber released the series on Blu-Ray for Region A.

== Sources ==
- Pitts, Michael R (2004). Famous Movie Detectives III. Scarecrow. p. 89. ISBN 978-0810836907.
- Winn, Christopher (2009). I Never Knew That About Wales. Random House. p. 39. ISBN 978-1407028231.
