= Maigret and the Lazy Burglar =

1961 novel by Georges Simenon

- Author: Georges Simenon
- Original title: French: Maigret et le Voleur paresseux
- Language: French
- Series: Inspector Jules Maigret
- Genre: Detective fiction, Crime fiction
- Publication date: 1961
- Publication place: Belgium
- Media type: Print
- Preceded by: Maigret in Society
- Followed by: Maigret and the Good People of Montparnasse

Maigret and the Lazy Burglar (also translated as Maigret and the Idle Burglar; French: Maigret et le Voleur paresseux) is a detective novel by Belgian writer Georges Simenon featuring Inspector Jules Maigret of the French judicial police. Written in July 1961 in Switzerland, it was published by Presses de la Cité that year.

== Other titles ==
The book has been translated twice into English: in 1963 (which was also published in 1973) by Daphne Woodward as Maigret and the Lazy Burglar, in 2003 as Maigret and the Idle Burglar, and in 2018 by Howard Curtis as Maigret and the Lazy Burglar.

== Synopsis ==
A body has been found in the 16th arrondissement 845 ha^{2} Bois de Boulogne park, badly beaten. Although out of his jurisdiction, Maigret assists his colleague... and identifies the deceased as a buglar whom had known for thirty years. He had never committed crimes of violence –what could have brought him to a violent end?

== Adaptations ==
The 81st episode of the French television series "Les Enquêtes du commissaire Maigret", directed by Jean-Marie Coldefy with Jean Richard in the lead role, is based on the novel.

A BBC adaption aired in 1962 entitled The Amateurs starrring Rupert Davies.

The first two episodes of the 2025 PBS Masterpiece series Maigret, "The Lazy Burglar", written and directed by Patrick Harbinson and starring Benjamin Wainwright, is a modern adaptation of the novel.

== Translations ==
The book wasd translated into the Georgian as მეგრე და ზარმაცი ქურდი (Maigret and the Lazy Thief) by Nani Madzaghua.

== Gallery ==
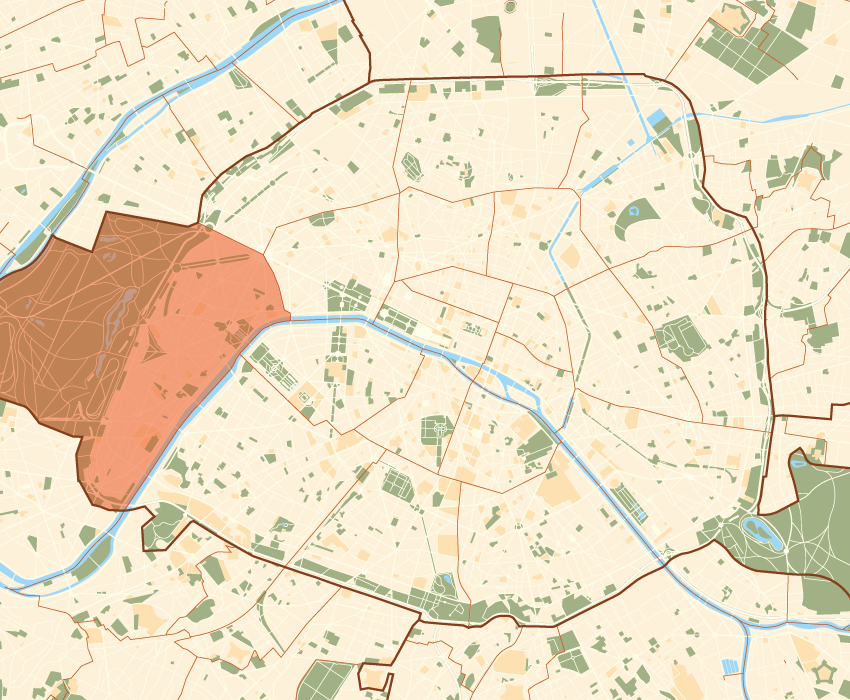
16th arrondissement

Bois de Boulogne
