= Inspector Maigret and the Strangled Stripper =

Novel by Georges Simenon

Inspector Maigret and the Strangled Stripper (original French-language title Maigret au "Picratt's") is a detective novel by the Belgian crime writer Georges Simenon published in 1950, featuring the author's most celebrated character Inspector Maigret. Its alternate English-language titles include Maigret in Montmartre and Maigret at Picratt's.

== Synopsis ==
The plot of the novel revolves around the murder of a stripper called Arlette, and the novel is noted for its depiction of the seedy nightlife of the Montmartre district in Paris.

== Plot ==
Arlette, a stripper at Picratt's nightclub in Montmartre, reports to the police that she has overheard two men plotting to kill a "countess". Soon afterwards both Arlette and the Countess von Farnhem, a drug user, are found dead. It turns out that Arlette was romantically involved with one of Maigret's colleagues, Inspector Lapointe. A man named Oscar becomes the lead suspect after Maigret finds out that he used to be the Countess's butler. Maigret uses another drug user, Philippe, to lead him to the killer, who is shot dead by Lapointe.

== English-language Editions ==
The novel has been published in English under three different titles:

- Maigret in Montmartre, translated by Daphne Woodward and published by Hamish Hamilton in the United Kingdom, together with Maigret's Mistake, in a book called Maigret Right and Wrong (1954)
- Inspector Maigret and the Strangled Stripper, translated by Cornelia Schaeffer and published by Doubleday in the United States (also 1954)
- Maigret at Picratt's, translated by William Hobson and published by Penguin in 2016.

== Adaptations ==
The novel has been rated one of the ten best Maigret stories and has been adapted several times for TV and film. It has been adapted three times in English: In 1960, as Murder in Montmartre, it was the first episode of the BBC's Maigret series, starring Rupert Davies in the title role; In 1993, as Maigret and the Night-club Dancer, it was an episode of the ITV Maigret series starring Michael Gambon; and in 2017, as Maigret in Montmartre, it was included in the later ITV series starring Rowan Atkinson.
