= The Saint-Fiacre Affair =

1932 novel by Georges Simenon

- Cover of the first French edition
- Author: Georges Simenon
- Original title: L'Affaire Saint-Fiacre
- Language: French
- Series: Inspector Jules Maigret
- Genre: Detective fiction, Crime fiction
- Publisher: Fayard
- Publication date: 1932
- Publication place: France
- English publication date: 1940
- Media type: Print
- Preceded by: The Shadow Puppet
- Followed by: The Flemish House

The Saint-Fiacre Affair (French: L'Affaire Saint-Fiacre), also known as Maigret Goes Home, is a 1932 detective novel by the Belgian writer Georges Simenon featuring his character Detective Chief Inspector Maigret of the Paris judicial police. Maigret travels to the village where he was born and raised to investigate an anonymous tip-off that a crime is about to be committed there. It has been translated into English three times and adapted for film and television six times.

== Plot ==
Detective Chief Inspector Maigret of the Paris judicial police receives an anonymous note stating that a crime will be committed at the church of Saint-Fiacre on All Soul's Day. Maigret, who was born and raised in Saint-Fiacre, travels to the village to investigate.

Following the first mass at the church on the designated day, the Countess of Saint-Fiacre is found dead in her seat in the chancel. Dr Bouchardon determines that the countess, who had a weak heart, has died of a heart attack.

The countess's body is taken to her chateau. Bouchardon tells Maigret that the countess had taken a series of private secretaries as lovers since her husband had died over twenty years earlier. Her most recent private secretary and lover was Jean Métayer.

Maigret interviews Maurice de Saint-Fiacre, the countess's son and heir. Maurice tells him that he is heavily in debt and needs 40,000 francs by tomorrow to cover a cheque, otherwise he will be arrested. He came to the village from Paris to borrow the money from his mother. Monsieur Gautier, the countess's estate manager, tells Maigret that Métayer had given the countess poor investment advice and had persuaded her to fund his failed business ventures in the printing industry, leaving her almost bankrupt.

Maigret suspects that someone had planted a message in the countess's missal that induced her heart attack. He goes to the church and discovers that the missal is missing. Soon after Maigret announces a reward for its return, the altar boy and his mother visit him and deliver the missal which she says her son stole. Maigret finds a cutting from a fake newspaper article in the missal which states that Maurice had shot himself in Paris the previous day because of a scandal involving his mother. Maigret questions Métayer about his involvement in the printing industry, but Métayer refuses to answer until his lawyer arrives.

Maigret learns the next day that someone has deposited 40,000 francs into Maurice's Paris bank account. He visits the chateau where Maurice tells him that the priest arranged a loan from a parishioner to avoid a scandal, even though the priest believes that Maurice killed his mother.

Gautier tells Maigret that the countess owed him 75,000 francs. Maigret goes to the nearby town of Moulin where Gautier's son Émile works in the bank and manages the countess's account. Émile tells him that the countess's farms have all been sold or mortgaged and the chateau is also mortgaged. Maigret meets Maurice, Métayer and Métayer's lawyer. The lawyer tells him that his client is innocent and it is unlikely that anyone could be prosecuted for the countess's death. Maigret makes enquiries in Moulin and learns that Maurice drove from Moulin at midnight and returned about 3 am on the morning of his mother's death.

Maurice invites Métayer, Métayer's lawyer, Maigret, the priest, Bouchardon and the Gautiers to the chateau for dinner on the eve of the funeral. At the dinner, Maurice says that the murderer is at the table. He asks the butler to bring him a pistol and places it at the centre of the round dining table. He announces that by midnight the murderer will be dead.

Maurice speculates on who among those present would have a motive for murdering the countess. He says that the priest knew of his mother's lovers and might have thought that it would be better for her to die in a state of grace immediately after communion. The Gautiers were possibly using their inside knowledge of the countess's financial position to secretly acquire her farms and mortgages. Métayer was mentioned in the countess's will and might have killed her to get what he could before she had second thoughts. Maurice says he, himself, was in debt and might have killed his mother to inherit what little was left of her estate.

Just before midnight, Maurice says that the killer knows that a conviction for murder would be unlikely but at least six people will know of his crime. Therefore the killer might shoot himself or kill everyone at the dinner. Émile grabs the pistol and shoots Maurice, who slumps to the table. Émile announces that he knows Maurice killed the countess because he saw him lurking around the chateau on the night before the crime. The altar boy and his mother also told him that Maurice had offered them money to give him the countess's missal. Maurice then stands and denies the accusation. Maigret checks the pistol and finds that it was loaded with blanks. Maurice explains that he knew either Métayer or the Gautiers killed his mother and he staged the dinner to discover the truth. Maigret refuses to intervene as Maurice severely beats Émile and throws him and his father out of the chateau.

The following day, Maigret questions the altar boy and concludes that the Gautiers intended to incriminate Métayer for the death of the countess but changed their plan at the last minute when they realised Maurice was more dangerous for them.

== Background ==
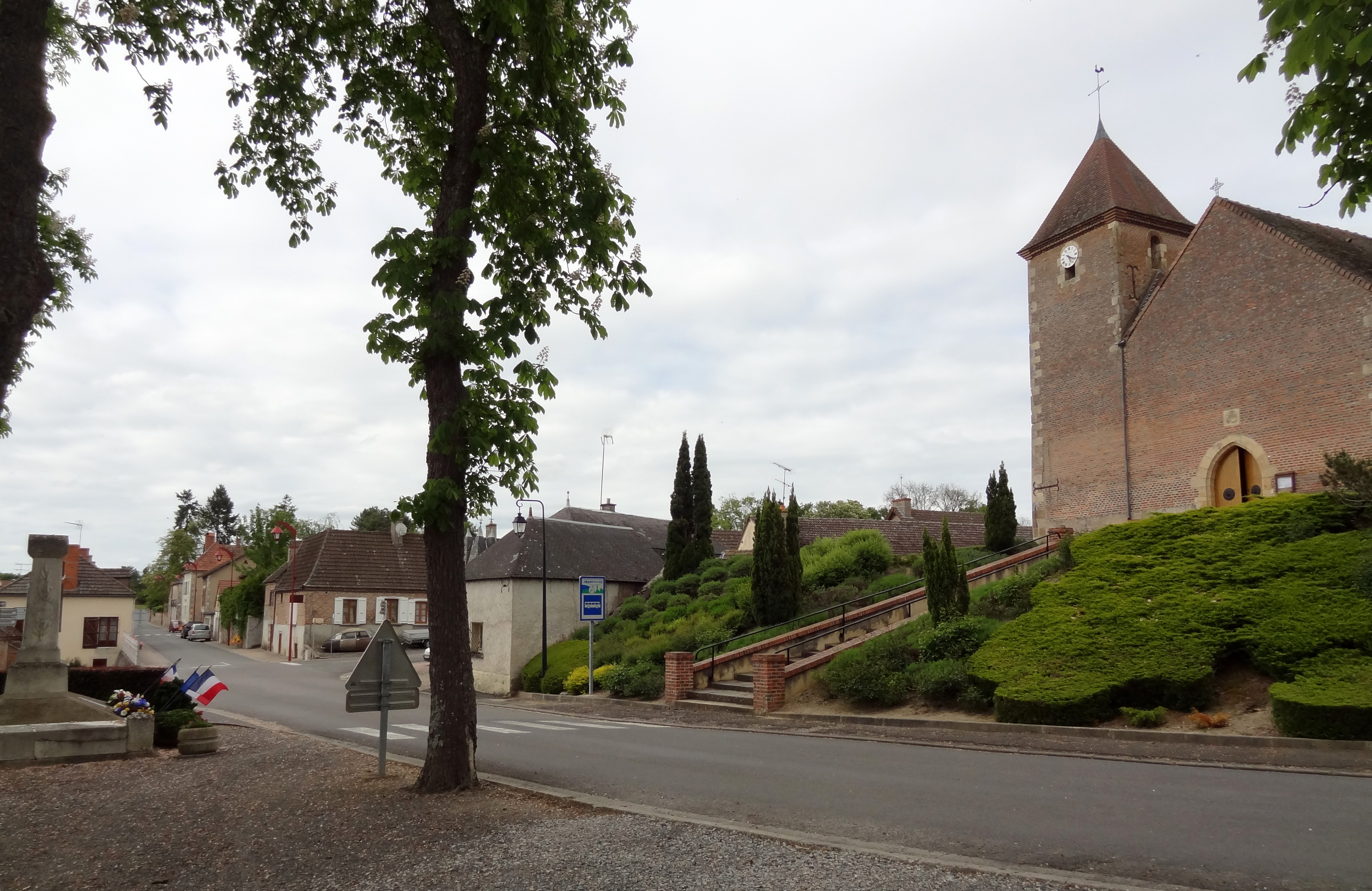
Village of Paray-le-Frésil, Allier, France, which inspired Simenon for the village of Saint-Fiacre

In the summer of 1923 Georges Simenon took up a position as the secretary for the Marquis de Tracy, one of the richest men in France. He held the position until the following spring, mostly working at Tracy's mansion at Paray-le-Frésil in the Allier department. Simenon used the mansion and the village as models for the countess's chateau and the fictional village of Saint-Fiacre. Simenon struck up a friendship with Tracy's bailiff and used him as a model for Maigret's father who, in the novel, was the estate manager for the Count de Saint-Fiacre during Maigret's childhood.

== Publication history ==
The novel was first published in French in 1932 under the title L'affaire Saint-Fiacre by Fayard in Paris. It was first published in English in 1940 by George Routledge & Sons, London, under the title The Saint-Fiacre Affair in a translation by Margaret Ludwig. It was republished as Maigret Goes Home in 1967 by Penguin Books, London, in a new translation by Robert Baldick. A third English translation, by Shaun Whiteside, was published in 2014 as The Saint-Fiacre Affair by Penguin Books, London.

== Film and television adaptations ==
- Maigret et l'Affaire Saint-Fiacre (1959). Directed by Jean Delannoy. Starring Jean Gabin as Maigret.
- "The Countess" (1962). An episode of the BBC Maigret television series starring Rupert Davies as Maigret.
- "L'Affaire Saint-Fiacre" (1980). An episode of the French TV series Les Enquêtes du Commissaire Maigret, directed by Jean-Paul Sassy and starring Jean Richard as Maigret.
- "Maigret on Home Ground" (1992). An episode of the 1992 ITV series starring Michael Gambon as Maigret.
- "Maigret et L'Affaire Saint-Fiacre" (1995). An episode of the French 1991 Maigret series directed by Denys de La Patellière and starring Bruno Cremer as Maigret.
- "Maigret Comes Home" (2025). The fifth and sixth episodes of the 2025 PBS Masterpiece series Maigret, with Benjamin Wainwright in the title role.

== Bibliography ==
- Becker, Lucille (2006). Georges Simenon: Maigrets and the romans dur. London: Haus Publishing. ISBN 9781904950349.
- Bresler, Fenton (1983). The Mystery of Georges Simenon: A Biography. London: Heinemann/Quixote Press. ISBN 0434980331.
- Forshaw, Barry (2022). Simenon: the Man, the Books, the Films, a 21st Century Guide. Harpenden, UK: Oldcastle Books. ISBN 9780857305145.
- Simenon, Georges (2014). The Saint-Fiacre Affair. Translated by Whiteside, Shaun. London: Penguin. ISBN 978-0-141-39475-6.
- Young, Trudee (1976). Georges Simenon, a checklist of his 'Maigret' and other mystery novels and short stories in French and in English translations. Metuchen, N.J.: The Scarecrow Press. ISBN 0-8108-0964-8.
