= Maigret's Failure =

Novel by Georges Simenon

- First edition
- Author: Georges Simenon
- Original title: Un échec de Maigret
- Translator: Daphne Woodward
- Language: French
- Series: Inspector Jules Maigret
- Genre: Detective fiction
- Publisher: Presses de la Cité, Hamish Hamilton
- Publication date: 1956
- English publication date: 1962
- Media type: Print
- Preceded by: Maigret Sets a Trap
- Followed by: Maigret's Little Joke

Maigret's Failure (French: Un échec de Maigret) is a detective novel by the Belgian writer Georges Simenon featuring his famous creation Jules Maigret. It was written in Cannes, France from 26 February to 4 March 1956. It has been translated into English by Daphne Woodward in 1962 and by William Hobson in 2017.

== Synopsis ==
Maigret is abruptly transferred from investigating the disappearance of an Englishwoman from a tour group when his superior orders him to protect Ferdinand Fumal, the owner of meat-packing conglomerate. His chief had gotten a call from the Minster of the Interior, so neither has any choice in the matter. Fumal has been receiving death threats, and has access to the Minister, having given millions to the ruling party.

Maigret, who has no truck with politics, recognizes Fumal as a bully from his childhood—his personality has not changed—and only stations a policeman to watch the house overnight. Before a proper investigation into the anonymous death threats can even begin, Fumal is shot to death at home, surveillance notwithstanding. What was once cursory and "political" is now no such thing. Maigret blames himself and goes about investigating the death of a man who was universally disliked, not missed by anyone, and who wrote the death threats to himself.

== Publishing history ==
Originally published in French in 1956 by Presses de la Cité as Un Echec de Maigret, the first English translation (translated by Daphne Woodward) was published by Hamish Hamilton in 1962. It was included in two anthologies, A Maigret Quartet (1972) and A Maigret Trio (1983).

== Adaptations ==
A BBC TV version of the book first aired on November 6, 1961, under the title Death of a Butcher with Rupert Davies playing Maigret.

Jean Richard played Maigret in the 1987 French TV version and Bruno Cremer in the 2003 adaptation.

It was adapted again as the third and fourth episodes of the 2025 PBS Masterpiece series Maigret with Benjamin Wainwright in the lead.

== See also ==
- review (in French) of Le Figaro
