= Maigret and the Headless Corpse =

1955 novel by Georges Simenon

- First edition
- Author: Georges Simenon
- Original title: Maigret et le corps sans tête
- Translator: Eileen Ellenbogen; Howard Curtis
- Language: French
- Series: Inspector Jules Maigret
- Genre: Detective fiction
- Publisher: Presses de la Cité, Harcourt Brace
- Publication date: 1955
- English publication date: 1968 & 2017
- Media type: Print
- Preceded by: Maigret and the Minister
- Followed by: Maigret Sets a Trap

Maigret and the Headless Corpse (French: Maigret et le corps sans tête) is a detective novel by the Belgian writer Georges Simenon. Originally written in French in 1955, the novel was translated into English by Eileen Ellenbogen and published by Harcourt Brace in 1968. A new translation by Howard Curtis was published by Penguin Books in 2017

== Plot ==
When a man's arm is fished out of the Canal Saint-Martin in Paris, Maigret and his colleagues are puzzled. A woman's arm they would understand as the work of a psychopath or a man's body as a gang-related killing, but they are even more puzzled when the rest of the man, minus his head, is retrieved from the canal. Maigret's attention turns to Madame Calas, a strange woman running a bistro along with her husband near the canal. The husband is away in the country, Madame Calas willingly sleeps with anyone who asks (Maigret does not test this theory) and the judge soon arrests her, her lover (the main one), and a young delivery boy (also a lover). Maigret is not satisfied and pushes further, and he uncovers the story and the motivation for the murder.

== Adaptations ==
A BBC TV version of the book first aired on October 30, 1961 under the title A Simple Case with Rupert Davies playing Maigret. A Canadian Broadcasting Corporation version aired in 1957 with Budd Knapp as Maigret.

Two French TV adaptations have been aired both under the French title, Maigret et le corps sans tête. Jean Richard starred in the first, which aired on 8 March 1974, and Bruno Cremer starred in the second, which aired on 11 September 1992.
