= Maigret Sets a Trap =

1955 detective novel by Georges Simenon

- First edition
- Author: Georges Simenon
- Original title: Maigret tend un piège
- Language: French
- Series: Inspector Jules Maigret
- Genre: Detective fiction
- Publisher: Presses de la Cité
- Publication date: 1955
- Media type: Print
- Preceded by: Maigret and the Headless Corpse
- Followed by: Maigret's Failure

Maigret Sets a Trap (French: Maigret tend un piège) is a 1955 detective novel by the Belgian novelist Georges Simenon featuring his fictional character Jules Maigret.

== Plot ==
Maigret sets a trap for a serial killer, hoping to lure him into error.

== Adaptations ==
- It was adapted as a 1958 film, entitled Maigret Sets a Trap with Jean Gabin as Maigret
- An episode for the 1960s BBC television series Maigret with Rupert Davies as Maigret (s03e12).
- A 1976 episode of the BBC radio series with Maurice Denham as Maigret
- An episode for the 1992 ITV television series Maigret with Michael Gambon as Maigret (s01e06).
- In France, Bruno Cremer, who played Maigret in 54 adaptations during 1991–2005, adapted this story in 1996 (episode 26 of 54, aka s06e02).
- An episode for ITV's 2016 television series Maigret with Rowan Atkinson as Maigret (s01e01).
