= Ben Wainwright =

Ben or Benjamin Wainwright may refer to:

- Ben Wainwright, character in The Accused (1988 film)
- Ben Wainwright, character in Feast of July
- Ben Wainwright (snowboarder) in FIS Snowboard World Cup
- Benjamin Wainwright (actor), English actor
