= Maigret and the Good People of Montparnasse =

- Author: Georges Simenon
- Original title: Maigret et les braves gens
- Translator: Ros Schwartz
- Language: French
- Series: Inspector Jules Maigret
- Genre: Detective fiction
- Published: 2018 by Penguin Books
- Preceded by: Maigret and the Lazy Burglar
- Followed by: Maigret and the Saturday Caller

Maigret and the Good People of Montparnasse is a novel by the Belgian writer Georges Simenon, written in Échandens, Switzerland. The original French novel Maigret et les braves gens appeared in 1962. The first translation was by Helen Thomson, published with the title Maigret and the Black Sheep, by Hamish Hamilton in 1976. The translation by Ros Schwartz was first published in 2018 by Penguin Books. It is the 58th of the series.

Inspector Jules Maigret investigates the background of an apparently unremarkable middle-class family after one of them is murdered with no apparent motive.

== Plot ==
A telephone call from a colleague during the night informs Maigret of a murder, and goes to investigate. At an apartment block in Montparnasse, a man has been fatally shot twice in a chair with his own pistol. He was one René Josselin, a retired businessman, formerly the owner of a cardboard box factory.

Maigret talks to his wife and daughter, who were at a theatre on the evening of the murder, and to the son-in-law Dr Fabre, a doctor devoted to work. Fabre was playing chess with Josselin that evening, but was called away to see a patient; the call turned out to be false. Dr Larue gives Maigret the family's background. The concierge noticed nothing unusual. A picture of the Josselins is formed: they are a respectable family, leading unremarkable lives, described as "decent sorts". It seems there are no secrets, and no motive for the murder. However, when questioning Madame Josselin, Maigret feels that the answers are calm and precise, but lifeless. Something is being left out.

The top floor of the apartment block contains the servants' rooms. It is discovered the key to the room for the Josselins' former maid—unused since the time she had been in their employ—is missing, and that cigarettes had recently been smoked. The murderer had evidently waited there after his crime until departure would go unnoticed. It is already established someone entering the building that evening had given the name of a resident who had not been out.

Knowing that René Josselin went for a daily walk, Maigret visits local businesses with a photo René Josselin. A waiter at a brasserie on the Boulevard de Montparnasse not only recognises him, they describe another man whom he was once with, who then later met his wife at the brasserie. An intriguing lead, but a dead end. Maigret, exhausting the possibilities, then canvasses the neighbourhood of Madame Josselin's early home. An elderly resident tells him of Madame Josselin's father, and informs him that she has a younger brother, one Philippe de Lancieux.

The details of the younger brother's life emerge when Maigret again interviews Madame Josselin. Philippe, one of the young toughs of Montparnasse, had an adventurous life which increasingly got him into difficulties. Often needing money, he took advantage of the patience of the Josselins, who for years never refused the black sheep of the family. Ultimately fearing arrest given the trajectory of his increasingly impulsive criminal life, Philippe desperately visited René Josselin to demand more money; René refuses and Philippse, in a rage, shoots him to death. Unable to believe her brother was the murderer, Madame Josselin hopes that he would simply leave the country. Six months later, it is reported that, having fallen in with hardened criminals, Philippe de Lancieux has been knifed to death for reasons unknown.

== External link ==
- Maigret and the Good People of Montparnasse review at Le Figaro (in French), 11 September 1961
