= Maigret Sets a Trap (film) =

1958 film by Jean Delannoy

- French theatrical release poster
- Directed by: Jean Delannoy
- Written by: Jean Delannoy; Rodolphe-Maurice Arlaud; Michel Audiard
- Based on: Maigret Sets a Trap by Georges Simenon
- Produced by: Jean-Paul Guibert
- Starring: Jean Gabin; Annie Girardot; Olivier Hussenot; Jeanne Boitel
- Cinematography: Louis Page
- Edited by: Henri Taverna
- Music by: Paul Misraki
- Production companies: Intermondia Films; Jolly Film
- Distributed by: Rank
- Release date: 29 January 1958
- Running time: 119 minutes
- Countries: France; Italy
- Language: French

Maigret Sets a Trap (French: Maigret tend un piège) is a 1958 crime film directed by Jean Delannoy and starring Jean Gabin, Annie Girardot and Olivier Hussenot. It is an adaptation of the novel Maigret Sets a Trap by Belgian writer Georges Simenon featuring his fictional detective Jules Maigret.

It was shot at the Epinay Studios in Paris and on location around the city. The film's sets were designed by the art director René Renoux. It was the first of three Maigret films starring Gabin; followed by Maigret and the Saint-Fiacre Case the following year and Maigret Sees Red in 1963.

== Plot ==
Maigret hunts a serial killer in Paris who stabs women in the evening streets and taunts the police with their failure to catch him.

== Cast ==
- Jean Gabin as Jules Maigret
- Annie Girardot as Yvonne Maurin
- Olivier Hussenot as Lagrume
- Jeanne Boitel as Louise Maigret
- Lucienne Bogaert as Mme Veuve Adèle Maurin
- Jean Debucourt as Camille Guimard
- Guy Decomble as Mazet
- Paulette Dubost as Mauricette Barberot
- Jacques Hilling as Le médecin légiste
- Hubert de Lapparent as Le juge Coméliau
- Jean Desailly as Marcel Maurin
- Gérard Séty as Georges "Jojo" Vacher
- Lino Ventura as Inspector Torrence
- André Valmy as Inspector Lucas
- Nadine Basile as L'assistante de police

== Critical reception ==
In The New York Times, Bosley Crowther wrote, "If you haven't yet made the acquaintance of French writer Georges Simenon and his famous and fascinating Parisian detective, Inspector Maigret, you can't ask a better introduction to both...an exciting example of the author's sophisticated work and a beautifully clear and catchy portrait of the gumshoe, performed by Jean Gabin...This is a don't-miss picture for the mystery fans."
