= Pietr the Latvian =

1930 novel by Georges Simenon

- First edition
- Author: Georges Simenon
- Original title: French: Pietr-le-Letton
- Language: French
- Series: Inspector Jules Maigret
- Genre: Detective fiction
- Publisher: A. Fayard
- Publication date: 1930
- Publication place: France
- Media type: Print
- Preceded by: N/A
- Followed by: The Late Monsieur Gallet

Pietr the Latvian (French: Pietr-le-Letton) is a 1930 detective novel by the Belgian writer Georges Simenon. It is the first novel in which Chief Inspector Jules Maigret of the Paris mobile crime brigade appears as a fully developed character.

Maigret attempts to track down an international crime boss dubbed "Pietr the Latvian" whom he only knows by description. In the course of his investigation he encounters a murder victim, a ship-owner, a Norwegian sea captain and a Russian drunkard who all fit the description and appear to be connected to each other through their past and present relationships.

The novel has been translated into English three times and adapted for television three times.

== Plot summary ==
Detective Chief Inspector Maigret of the French Judicial Police is notified that Pietr the Latvian, an international fraudster and leader of the Baltic Gang, is travelling to Paris by train. Furnished with a detailed description, Maigret plans to intercept Pietr at the Gare du Nord railway station where Pietr is due to arrive on the Étoile du Nord. Immediately after Maigret spots a man who matches the description leaving the Étoile du Nord, there is a commotion on the train and he investigates. He is directed to a body in one of the train's toilets; the dead man also matches the description.

Maigret tracks the first man to The Hôtel Majestic and finds that he signed in as Oswald Oppenheim, a ship-owner from Bremen. Oppenheim dines that evening with an American millionaire, Mortimer-Levington, and the millionaire's wife. After dinner, Maigret questions Mortimer-Levington. Oppenheim and Mortimer-Levington then secretly leave the hotel. Maigret calls detective Torrence to keep a watch at the hotel for their return.

A forensic examination of the victim leads Maigret to the seaside town of Fécamp, and to the family of a Norwegian sea captain, Olaf Swaan. Olaf's wife, Bethe, says he is at sea, but her description of him matches Pietr's. Maigret stakes out the house and sees a man who matches Pietr's description emerge. He follows him to a bar, where he is told that the man is an itinerant Russian and a drunkard. Maigret follows him back to Paris, then to a cheap hotel in the Marais district where he learns that the Russian is named Fyodor Yurevich and lives with a Jewish woman, Anna Gorskin. Maigret calls two detectives to stake out the hotel.

Torrence tells Maigret that Mortimer-Levington has returned to the Hôtel Majestic. Maigret follows the Mortimer-Levingtons to a theatre then a nightclub. As he follows them from the nightclub, he is shot in the street and wounded. He takes a taxi to the Hôtel Majestic and finds that Torrence has been murdered.

The following day, Maigret learns that Oppenheim has returned to the Hôtel Majestic. After his doctor treats his flesh wound, Maigret discovers that Yurevich escaped surveillance the previous night, disguised as an old man. Maigret goes to the Hôtel Majestic and confronts Oppenheim in his suite. Mortimer-Levington enters the suite, but when he sees Maigret he flees. Maigret locks Oppenheim in his room and pursues Mortimer-Levington but is too late to prevent Gorskin from shooting the millionaire dead in his room. Maigret arrests her. Meanwhile, Oppenheim has escaped from his room through a window.

Maigret discovers photographs in Gorskin's hotel room which lead him to believe that both Oppenheim and Yurevich are really Hans Johansson, an Estonian citizen born in Pskov, Russia. He returns to Fécamp and discovers Johansson hiding under a pier. After a short struggle on the rocky seashore, Johansson gives himself up. Maigret leads him to a nearby inn where they take a room to dry off.

While drinking a bottle of rum, Hans explains that his twin brother Pietr recruited Mortimer-Levington to finance a fleet of ships to smuggle alcoholic drinks to the United States, then under prohibition. Hans forged documents for Pietr, giving him the new identity of Olaf Swann. Under this identity, Pietr married Hans' girlfriend, Berthe, in Fécamp. Hans went to Paris where he met Gorskin who fell in love with him. However, he was still in love with Berthe and stalked her during his extended drinking binges in Fécamp whenever Pietr was away. Berthe knew that Hans was Pietr's brother and admonished him for not being more like her husband, so Hans killed Pietr and assumed his identity. After Mortimer-Levington became suspicious of Hans, Hans fled to Fécamp dressed as a tramp. He visited Berthe, telling her that he was wanted for theft. Berthe saw Maigret off, then told Hans to leave the house. Returning to Paris as Oppenheim, Hans learned from Gorskin that Mortimer-Levington had visited her and had discovered Hans' true identity. She killed Mortimer-Levington to protect her relationship with Hans. Maigret allows the drunk and broken Hans to take Maigret's service revolver and shoot himself.

== Background ==
In the spring of 1929, Simenon set off for a tour of northern France, Belgium and Holland in his boat, the Ostrogoth. He had begun contributing detective stories to a new magazine called Détective and also published popular novels, mainly with the publisher Fayard.

During his northern tour, Simenon wrote three popular novels which featured a police inspector named Maigret: Train de nuit (Night Train), La femme rousse (The Red-Headed Woman) and La maison de l'inquiétude (The House of Anxiety). He began working on Train de nuit, or possibly Pietr-le-Letton (Pietr the Latvian), in September 1929 when the Ostrogoth was undergoing repairs in the Dutch city of Delfzijl.

On his return to Paris in April 1930, Simenon completed Pietr-le-Letton, the first novel in which Chief Inspector Maigret of the Paris mobile crime brigade was a fully developed character. The novel was serialised in Fayard's magazine Ric et Rac later that year. Simenon considered this the first "true" Maigret novel, and it was the first fictional work to appear under Simenon's real name.

Simenon stated that he invented Maigret while drinking in a cafe and imagining a Parisian policeman: "a large powerfully built gentleman...a pipe, a bowler hat, a thick overcoat."

== Publication history ==
Following its serialisation, the novel was published as a book in French as Pietr-le-Letton, by Fayard in Paris in 1931. It has been translated three times into English: by Anthony Abbot, published in 1933 as The Case of Peter the Lett (United Kingdom) and The Strange Case of Peter the Lett (United States); by Daphne Woodward, published in 1963 as Maigret and the Enigmatic Lett; and by David Bellos, published in 2013 as Pietr the Latvian.

== Adaptations ==
The story has been adapted for television three times: In English in 1963 (with Rupert Davies in the main role); in Dutch in 1967 (Jan Teulings); and in French in 1972 (Jean Richard).

== See also ==
- Le Monde's 100 Books of the Century
