= Maigret's Little Joke =

1957 novel by Georges Simenon

Maigret's Little Joke (French: Maigret s'amuse) is a 1957 detective novel by the Belgian writer Georges Simenon featuring Jules Maigret of the French Judicial police. It is the 78th novel in the Maigret series, It was written in Mougins, France in September 1956 and first published by Presses de la Cité in 1957, translated into English by Richard Brain that same year (Maigret's Little Joke/None of Mairget's Business), and by David Watson in 2017 (Maigret Enjoys Himself).

The Arrow British edition is available for download from the Internet Archive.

== Synopsis ==
The nude body of a doctor's wife has been found shoved in a cupboard at their home, and Maigret follows the case with interest in the newspapers, albeit at one remove, for he and Mme Maigret are on vacation and Janvier is in charge. They had initially planned to take their two-week vacation seaside resort town Les Sables-d'Olonne in western France, even to the extent of having had their mail forwarded, but decide on a staycation in Paris instead. The six-day case is a fairly complicated one of the cherchez la femme variety which Maigret's protege lets solve itself, much to Maigret's professional satisfaction.

== Adaptations ==
=== Television ===
- Maigret incognito, Jan Teulings (Dutch), 28 April 1968
- Maigret s'amuse, Jean Richard (French), Antenne 2, 29 June 1983
- Maigret's Little Joke, Rupert Davies (English), BBC TV, 24 December 1963

== See also ==
- Analysis (French and English)
- Internet Archive, UK Arrow edition
