= Wolfe (TV series) =

British television drama

- Genre: Police procedural; Drama
- Created by: Paul Abbott
- Starring: Babou Ceesay; Natalia Tena; Amanda Abbington; Adam Long; Shaniqua Okwok; Christine Tremarco; Talitha Wing; Naomi Yang
- Country of origin: United Kingdom
- Original language: English
- No. of series: 1
- No. of episodes: 6 (list of episodes)

Production
- Executive producers: Paul Abbott; Martin Carr; Paul Coe
- Producer: Emma Burge
- Running time: 60 minutes
- Production companies: AbbottVision; Sky Studios

Original release
- Network: Sky Max
- Release: 10 September 2021

Wolfe is a six-part British police procedural television series created by Paul Abbott. It stars Babou Ceesay as the titular Professor Wolfe Kinteh, a crime scene investigator and academic in Northern England. The series premiered on 10 September 2021 on Sky Max.

== Cast and characters ==
=== Main ===
- Babou Ceesay as Professor Wolfe Kinteh
- Natalia Tena as Val Kinteh
- Amanda Abbington as Dot
- Adam Long as Steve
- Shaniqua Okwok as Dominique
- Christine Tremarco as DCI Betsy Chambers
- Talitha Wing as Flick
- Naomi Yang as Maggy

=== Supporting ===
- Zak Ford-Williams as Tyler
- Pooky Quesnel as Maxine
- William Ash as Jeff
- Aidan O'Callaghan as Jake
- Cathy Tyson as Fay

== Episodes ==
No. overall	Episode	Directed by	Written by	Original release date
1	Episode 1	Adrian Shergold	Paul Abbott	10 September 2021
2	Episode 2	Adrian Shergold	Georgia Lester	10 September 2021
3	Episode 3	Sean Spencer	Freddy Syborn	10 September 2021
4	Episode 4	Adrian Shergold	Cat Jones	10 September 2021
5	Episode 5	Adrian Shergold	Furquan Akhtar	10 September 2021
6	Episode 6	Adrian Shergold	Cat Jones	10 September 2021

== Broadcast ==
The series premiered on 10 September 2021 on Sky Max.

== Reception ==
Ed Power of The Telegraph gave it two out five stars, deeming it 'uneven'. Suzi Feay of the Financial Times gave it three stars. Barbara Ellen of The Observer praised Ceesay's performance, stating it elevated the series.
