= The Patience of Maigret =

1965 novel by Georges Simenon

- First French edition (publ. Presses de la Cité)
- Author: Georges Simenon
- Language: English
- Subject: Crime fiction
- Published: 1965 (George Routledge and Sons Ltd.)
- Publication place: England
- Media type: Print (hardback, paperback)
- Pages: 320
- OCLC: 10772698

The Patience of Maigret (French: La Patience de Maigret) is a 1965 detective novel by the Belgian writer Georges Simenon featuring his character Jules Maigret. It was written in Épalinges, Switzerland from 25 February to 9 March 1965.

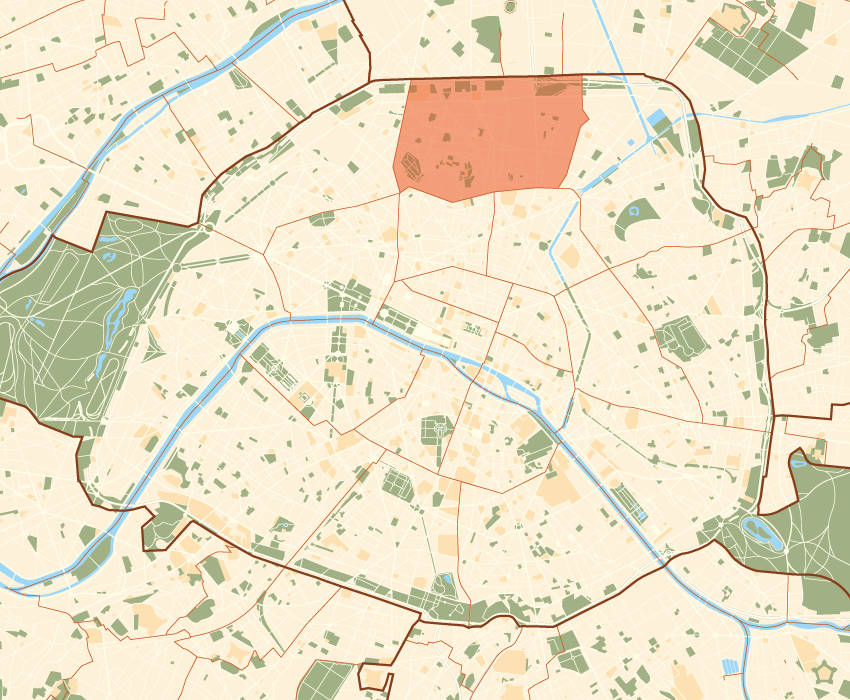
18th arrondissement of Paris

== Synopsis ==
Maigret searches for evidence that a now elderly nemesis whom he has known for two decades is the kingpin behind a series of jewel robberies. When the wheelchair-bound gangster is found dead in his 18th arrondissement flat, Maigret investigates his criminal connections, past and present, as well as virtually all of his neighbors, to find his murderer. Some of the characters in Maigret on the Defensive are met again, the venerable affair of the jewelry thefts is finally wound up, and Maigret has many occasions to reflect on his career and life.

== Adaptations ==
It has been adapted several times for television, most recently as an ITV episode of its 1992 Maigret series starring Michael Gambon.
