= Shaniqua Okwok =

English actress

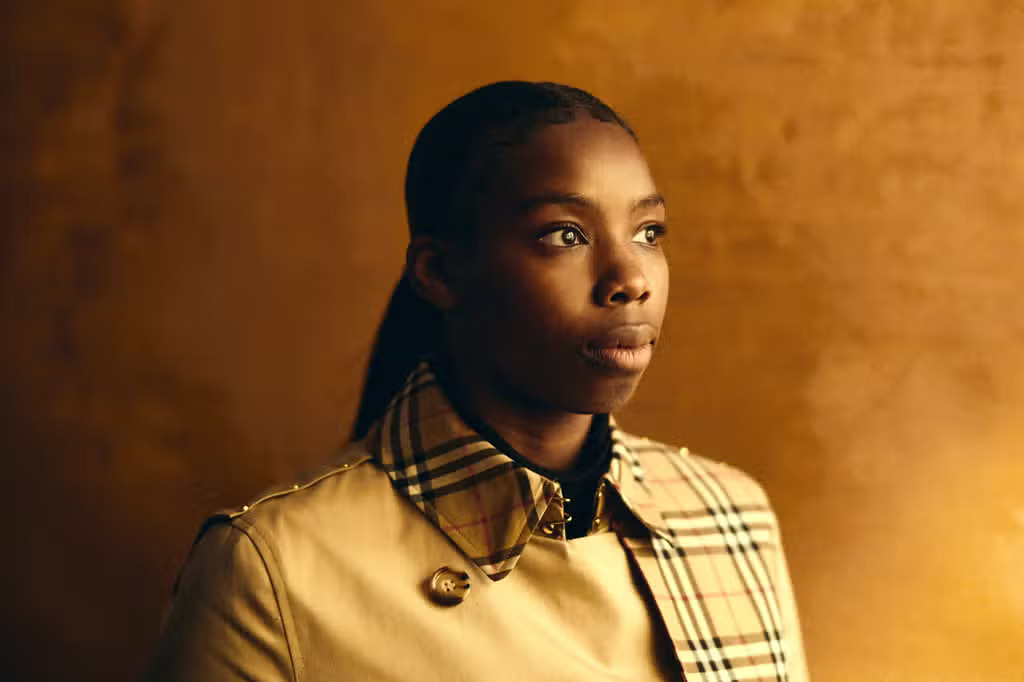
- Shaniqua Okwok by Alan Howard Photography (2021)
- Born: Surrey, England
- Education: Royal Central School of Speech and Drama
- Occupation: Actress
- Years active: 2018–present

Shaniqua Okwok is a British actress. She is best known for her roles as Maia in Paramount+ series The Flatshare (2022), Dominique in the Sky Max series Wolfe (2021), and Berthe Janvier in the crime drama Maigret (2025–present).

Okwok has also made appearances as Solly Babatunde in It's a Sin (2021), Patty in Small Axe, Lotta Nagel in Van der Valk, and Leah in War of the Worlds.

Okwok was later cast in an adaptation of Never Let Me Go for FX, which was ultimately not taken forward in 2023. She became an ambassador for the NSPCC's Childhood campaign in 2024.

== Early life ==
Okwok was born in Surrey to an Ugandan mother and a Jamaican father. She attended The BRIT School and The Royal Central School of Speech and Drama, where she graduated in 2018. After receiving the Laurence Olivier Bursary Award from the Official London Theatre in 2017, she went on to make her television debut on BBC One in 2018 as Helen Nedarson in Shakespeare & Hathaway: Private Investigators.

Okwok originally wanted to be a stock broker and planned to study economics at LSE. However, she claims she "fell into acting and it kept falling into place".

== Personal life ==
Okwok got involved in social justice work early on in her acting career. Following her graduation from Royal Central School of Speech and Drama and during the summer of 2020, Okwok led a student campaign of hundreds to call out the "words and actions of open and overt racism" that occurred during her tenure at the institute, including an incident of being called a "slave" during a class. Okwok remains an active advocate for the protection of minority actors to this day.

== Filmography ==
=== Film ===
Year	Title	Role	Notes
2020	Anthony	Dominique Walker	TV movie
2020	Acrimonious	Kehinde	Short film
2020	Rejoice Resist	Self	Short film
2021	I Love You I Hate You	Annie	Short film

=== Television ===
Year	Title	Role	Notes
2018	Shakespeare & Hathaway: Private Investigators	Helen Nedarson	Episode: "Ill Met by Moonlight"
2020	Van der Valk	Lotta Nagel	Episode: "Death in Amsterdam"
2020	Sick of It	Waitress	Episode: "Use by Date"
2020	Marcella	Alanah	2 episodes
2020	Small Axe	Patty	Episode: "Lovers Rock"
2021	It's a Sin	Solly Babatunde	3 episodes
2021	War of the Worlds	Leah	2 episodes
2021	Wolfe (TV series)	Dominique	6 episodes
2022	The Flatshare	Maia	6 episodes
2025	Bookish	Linda	2 episodes
2025–present	Maigret	Berthe Janvier	6 episodes

=== Podcasts ===
Year	Title	Role	Notes
2021	Fully Amplified	Narrator	Episode: Still Gay As Hell
