= Maigret and the Man on the Boulevard =

1953 detective novel by Georges Simenon

- Author: Georges Simenon
- Original title: Maigret et l'homme du banc
- Language: French
- Series: Inspector Jules Maigret
- Release number: 41
- Genre: Detective fiction
- Publisher: Presses de la Cité
- Publication date: 1953
- Media type: Print
- Preceded by: Maigret's Revolver
- Followed by: Maigret Afraid

Maigret and the Man on the Boulevard (French: Maigret et l'homme du banc, also published in English as Maigret and the Man on the Bench and The Man on the Boulevard) is a detective novel by the Belgian writer Georges Simenon.

== Synopsis ==
Rupert Davies playing Maigret in Murder on Monday.

== Publication history ==
Maigret et l'homme du banc was first published by Le Figaro in serial form between 31 January 1953 and 3 March 1953 in 29 episodes. The original book edition was by Presses de la Cité in 1953. The book was written by Simenon while staying in Shadow Rock Farm in Lakeville, Connecticut.

The first English editions were published in 1975 by Harcourt Brace Jovanovich (USA) as Maigret and the Man on the Bench and by Hamish Hamilton (UK) as Maigret and the Man on the Boulevard. Eileen Ellenbogen was the translator.

== Adaptations ==
BBC TV aired an adaption of the novel titled Murder on Monday on 15 January 1962 with Rupert Davies playing Maigret. Jean Richard played Maigret in the French telefilm that aired on 17 October 1973, and Bruno Cremer played the detective in the French TV version of this book aired on 17 December 1993 which was directed by Etienne Périer.
