= Maigret (2025 TV series) =

Television series

- Genre: Crime drama
- Based on: Jules Maigret by Georges Simenon
- Written by: Patrick Harbinson
- Directed by: Patrick Harbinson; Faye Gilbert; David Evans
- Starring: Benjamin Wainwright; Stefanie Martini; Nathalie Armin; Reda Elazouar; Blake Harrison; Kerrie Hayes; Shaniqua Okwok; Rob Kazinsky
- Composer: Uèle Lamore
- Country of origin: United Kingdom
- Original language: English
- No. of series: 2
- No. of episodes: 12

Production
- Executive producers: Colin Callender; David Stern; Susanne Simpson
- Production company: Playground Entertainment

Original release
- Network: PBS
- Release: 5 October 2025 – present

Maigret is a 2025 British television series based on the Jules Maigret novels by Georges Simenon, starring Benjamin Wainwright as the detective Maigret. It premiered on PBS Masterpiece in the United States on 5 October 2025, and on ABC Television and ABC iview on 7 November 2025 in Australia. A United Kingdom release date was confirmed in October 2026, when it was announced that UKTV had picked up the series for broadcast on U&Drama and the U streaming platform on 8 December 2026.

On 16 April 2026, PBS Masterpiece and Playground Entertainment announced that the series had been renewed for a second series, which will debut on October 18, 2026.

== Premise ==
Jules Maigret is a rising young detective in the Paris Police Judiciaire, who heads La Crim, the serious crime unit.

Unlike previous adaptations, the series is set in the present day.

== Cast ==
=== Main ===
- Benjamin Wainwright as Chief Inspector Jules Maigret, an unconventional young detective rising up the ranks of the Paris Police Judiciaire who cares about getting the right results, not a result.
- Stefanie Martini as Louise Maigret, Maigret's wife and confidante, a young psychiatric nurse.
- Nathalie Armin as Prosecutor Mathilde Kernavel, Maigret's more by-the-book, hierarchy-minded superior from the Ministry of Justice.
- Reda Elazouar as Detective Karim LaPointe, the youngest member of Maigret's team, a computer expert.
- Blake Harrison as Sergeant Joseph Torrence (Series 1), a snarky, old-school member of Maigret's team who has a secret relationship with Janvier.
- Kerrie Hayes as Sergeant Andrea Lucas, Maigret's tough, no-nonsense right-hand woman.
- Shaniqua Okwok as Detective Berthe Janvier, a brash, confident policewoman who is one of the newer additions to Maigret's team and has a secret relationship with Torrence.
- Rob Kazinsky as Inspector Justin Cavre, a well-educated, hard-working detective who resents Maigret for getting the Chief Inspector position he feels he deserved.
- Nathaniel Parker as Director of Police Xavier Guichard (Series 2), Maigret's mentor who turns antagonistic toward his former protégé.
- Alex Bhat as George Bonfils (Series 2), an Internal Affairs officer who becomes an unwelcome addition to Maigret's team.

=== Recurring ===
- James Northcote as Joseph Moers, an unflappable young lab technician.
- Rachel Shelley as La Comtesse Sophie de Saint-Fiacre, a countess who Fumal was attempting to force out of her estate, and Maigret's childhood crush.
- Ralph Berkin as Evariste Maigret, Maigret's father, an estate manager in Saint-Fiacre who died years prior to the series, and whose pipe Maigret keeps as a keepsake.
- Anders Grundberg as young Jules Maigret.

=== Notable guests ===
- Jack Deam as Inspector Aristide Foulon, an eccentric friend and coworker of Maigret's.
- Katie McGrath as Rosalie Fernand, the wife of incarcerated thief Gustave Fernand.
- Danny Kirrane as Ferdinand Fumal, a billionaire who grew up with Maigret who hires him to protect him against death threats, despite his apparent resentment of Maigret.
- Sam Troughton as Colonel Émile Danet, a shady French government official.
- Freddy Carter as Maurice de Saint-Fiacre, Sophie's son, an art critic mixed up in criminal matters.
- Enzo Cilenti as Edmond Batille, the father of a murdered youth.
- Nigel Lindsay as Sebastian Gautier, Sophie's shady estate manager.
- CJ Beckford as Claude van Damme, a restaurateur.
- Phoebe Sparrow as Genevieve Balloir, a banker.
- Dóra Sztarenki as Adeline Jeunet, an activist who commits suicide outside of a bank robbery.

== Episodes ==
=== Series overview ===
Season	Episodes	Originally released	
Season	Episodes	First released	Last released
1	6	October 5, 2025	November 9, 2025
2	6	October 18, 2026	November 22, 2026

=== Series 1 (2025) ===
No. overall	No. in series	Title	Directed by	Written by	US air date
1	1	"The Lazy Burglar - Part One"	Patrick Harbinson	Patrick Harbinson	October 5, 2025
While investigating a series of bank robberies, Maigret also investigates the brutal murder of a burglar whom he knew, Honoré Cuendet. Source: Maigret and the Lazy Burglar
2	2	"The Lazy Burglar - Part Two"	Patrick Harbinson	Patrick Harbinson	October 12, 2025
Maigret anticipates the bank robbers' next target. He reconstructs the fatal attack on the burglar. Maigret and his wife receive good news. He again dreams about Countess Sophie asking when he is coming home to Saint-Fiacre.
3	3	"Maigret's Failure - Part One"	Faye Gilbert	Patrick Harbinson	October 19, 2025
Maigret’s investigation into a missing social media influencer is derailed when he is tasked with investigating threatening messages sent to billionaire businessman Frank Fumal. Maigret and Fumal share a complicated past, having grown up together under strained circumstances. As Maigret juggles both cases, Fumal’s relentless intimidation pushes him toward a choice he knows he will come to regret. Source: Maigret's Failure
4	4	"Maigret's Failure - Part Two"	Faye Gilbert	Patrick Harbinson	October 26, 2025
As Maigret grapples with the fallout of failing to protect Fumal, he is dealt a crushing blow in his personal life. Under growing pressure to solve the disappearance of the social media influencer, Maigret immerses himself in Fumal’s world, examining his relationships and connections in search of answers. In doing so, he uncovers a side of Fumal he never knew existed, one that forces him to reassess not only the man himself, but also the history they share.
5	5	"Maigret Comes Home - Part One"	David Evans	Patrick Harbinson	November 2, 2025
After a student from a wealthy family who is recording conversations in Paris is stabbed to death in the street, Maigret attempts to provoke the killer into making contact. Countess Sophie calls Maigret, begging him to come home to Saint-Fiacre. Source: Maigret Goes Home
6	6	"Maigret Comes Home - Part Two"	David Evans	Patrick Harbinson	November 9, 2025
Maigret returns to Saint-Fiacre, where tragedy strikes. Some of the team from La Crim join Maigret to investigate the deceit and corruption that ruined Sophie’s life. Maigret's calls with the killer have dangerous results.

=== Series 2 (2026) ===
No. overall	No. in series	Title	Directed by	Written by	US air date
7	1	"The Hanged Man - Part One"	Unknown	Unknown	October 18, 2026
8	2	"The Hanged Man - Part Two"	TBA	TBA	October 25, 2026
9	3	"Maigret's Revolver - Part One"	TBA	TBA	November 1, 2026
10	4	"Maigret's Revolver - Part Two"	TBA	TBA	November 8, 2026
11	5	"The Yellow Dog - Part One"	David Evans	Patrick Harbinson	November 15, 2026
12	6	"The Yellow Dog - Part Two"	TBA	TBA	November 22, 2026

== Production ==
In 2021, the estate of Georges Simenon made a co-production and licensing deal with Playground Entertainment and Red Arrow Studios to produce a new English-language series of Simenon's Maigret novels, with the option extending to the entire canon. By 2024, Red Arrow were no longer involved with the production.

In September 2024, the main cast and creative team were revealed, along with the news that production had commenced in Budapest, where several previous Maigret adaptations have been shot. The six-episode series airs on PBS under their "Masterpiece Mystery" banner, with global distribution handled by Banijay Rights.

As of July 2025, development on a second series was under way in Budapest. Filming started in Budapest in April 2026.

== Broadcast ==
Maigret premiered on 5 October 2025 in the United States, on PBS Masterpiece. After being acquired by Banijay Rights, Maigret premiered on ABC Television and ABC iview in Australia on 7 November 2025. It premiered on VRT Canvas in the Netherlands and Belgium on 1 May 2026. it premiered on RTÉ in the Republic of Ireland on 13 May 2026.

Season 2 will stream on the PBS app and PBS Masterpiece on Amazon Prime Video and be broadcast on local PBS stations in the United States.

== Reception ==
John Anderson, writing in The Wall Street Journal, called the series "engaging", and praised the modernisation of the character as well as Wainwright's performance.
