= The Lord of the Rings: The War of the Rohirrim =

2024 anime fantasy film

- Theatrical release poster
- Directed by: Kenji Kamiyama
- Screenplay by: Jeffrey Addiss; Will Matthews; Phoebe Gittins; Arty Papageorgiou
- Story by: Jeffrey Addiss; Will Matthews; Philippa Boyens
- Based on: Characters created by J. R. R. Tolkien
- Produced by: Philippa Boyens; Jason DeMarco; Joseph Chou
- Starring: Brian Cox; Gaia Wise; Luke Pasqualino; Laurence Ubong Williams; Lorraine Ashbourne; Miranda Otto
- Edited by: Tsuyoshi Sadamatsu
- Music by: Stephen Gallagher
- Production companies: New Line Cinema; Warner Bros. Animation; Sola Entertainment; WingNut Films; Domain Entertainment
- Distributed by: Warner Bros. Pictures
- Release date: 3 December 2024
- Running time: 134 minutes
- Countries: New Zealand; Japan; United States
- Language: English
- Budget: $30 million
- Box office: $20.7 million

The Lord of the Rings: The War of the Rohirrim is a 2024 anime fantasy film directed by Kenji Kamiyama from a screenplay by Jeffrey Addiss & Will Matthews and Phoebe Gittins & Arty Papageorgiou, based on characters created by J. R. R. Tolkien. Set around 200 years before Peter Jackson's The Lord of the Rings (2001–2003) and The Hobbit (2012–2014) film trilogies, it tells the story of legendary Rohan king Helm Hammerhand. When the neighboring Dunlendings propose a marriage to his daughter Héra, Helm unintentionally kills their leader and starts a war. The film stars Brian Cox as Helm and Gaia Wise as Héra, alongside Luke Pasqualino, Laurence Ubong Williams, Lorraine Ashbourne, and Miranda Otto.

The film was announced in June 2021 and development was fast-tracked to prevent New Line Cinema from losing the film adaptation rights for Tolkien's novels. Kamiyama was involved by then, as were producer Philippa Boyens—who co-wrote Jackson's films—and writers Addiss and Matthews. Gittins and Papageorgiou re-wrote the script, which is based on details in the appendices of Tolkien's novel The Lord of the Rings (1954–1955) covering the history of Rohan's rulers. They chose to focus on Helm's daughter, who is unnamed in the appendices. Sola Entertainment provided the traditional 2D animation, taking inspiration from Jackson's films. The main cast was revealed in June 2022, including Miranda Otto reprising her role from Jackson's trilogy as Éowyn, who narrates the film. Jackson and his trilogy co-writer Fran Walsh were credited as executive producers by June 2024.

The Lord of the Rings: The War of the Rohirrim premiered on 3 December 2024, and was released theatrically by Warner Bros. Pictures in international markets from 5 December and in the United States on 13 December. The film received mixed reviews from critics and grossed $20.7 million worldwide against a $30 million production budget.

== Plot ==
Éowyn narrates the story of Héra, a would-be shieldmaiden of Rohan and the daughter of King Helm Hammerhand who lived around 200 years before Bilbo Baggins finds the One Ring.

Freca, a Dunlending lord, comes to King Helm's hall with his son Wulf, Héra's childhood friend. Freca is upset that Héra is to be married to a lord of Gondor and tries to force marriage between Wulf and Héra, in order to usurp Rohan's throne. Wulf wishes to marry Héra, but she is uninterested in marrying anyone. Helm and Freca begin a fist-fight outside the hall, during which Helm unintentionally kills Freca with a single blow, earning him the nickname "Hammerhand".

Wulf, devastated, vows revenge, leaves and is not heard of for years. One day, Héra and her part-Dunlending cousin Fréaláf encounter a dead Southron warrior, a tamer of mûmakil. The warrior's mûmak, rabid, appears and attacks; Héra disposes of it by luring it to a forest lake where it is eaten by a Watcher in the Water. Targg, one of Freca's generals, follows and kidnaps her. She is taken to Wulf's stronghold at Isengard and discovers that Wulf has become High Lord of the Dunlendings, a host of hill-tribe rebels. Héra asks Wulf if he would reconsider his attack on Rohan if she agreed to wed him. However, Wulf interprets the offer as contempt for him. Héra is rescued by Fréaláf and her aunt Olwyn.

Wulf invades Rohan. Helm thinks Fréaláf is a coward for wishing to evacuate Edoras to Dunharrow fortress, and casts him out. Helm prepares for battle after Lord Thorne promises to raise men, but Héra discovers that Thorne is a traitor; he tries to kill her, but Héra and her horse kill him. As battle ensues, Héra evacuates Edoras to the Hornburg upon realizing her father has been betrayed and his army is outnumbered. Wulf kills Helm's son Haleth in battle, then captures Haleth's brother Hama and murders him in front of Helm, who offered to die in his place. Wulf begins a siege of the Hornburg which lasts the winter, and builds an enormous siege-tower.

Helm, wounded and grief-stricken, sneaks out at night by a secret passage to kill Wulf's forces using only his fists. While searching for Helm during one of his night raids, and helping him kill a troll, Héra chances upon two orcs from Mordor who are taking rings from the dead, as instructed by their master. Helm leads Héra back to the Hornburg's gates. When Wulf and his forces pursue them, Helm remains behind to cover Héra's escape and dies fighting, frozen standing up, knees unbent.

Héra sends an eagle bearing Helm's armour to Fréaláf for help and, dressed in a beautiful old bridal dress, rides onto the siege-tower bridge that Wulf has just lowered to invade the Hornburg, and challenges him to combat, to distract him and his army from the Rohirrim escaping via the secret passage. She defeats Wulf and demands his surrender. Targg, who had counselled Wulf to call off the siege, agrees with her, but Wulf murders him. Fréaláf arrives with his men and uses Helm's horn and armour to scare the Dunlendings into believing Helm has returned from the grave, sending them fleeing. Wulf attacks Héra, but she chokes him to death with a shield, ending the war.

Helm goes on to be the namesake for the valley of the Hornburg and its stronghold. Saruman the White is the new keeper of Isengard and offers friendship to Fréaláf, the new king. Héra, uninterested in ruling, goes off with Olwyn to seek adventure; her first is meeting Gandalf, who has questions about the orcs she saw hunting for rings. Éowyn concludes that Héra remained wild and free until the end of her days.

== Voice cast ==
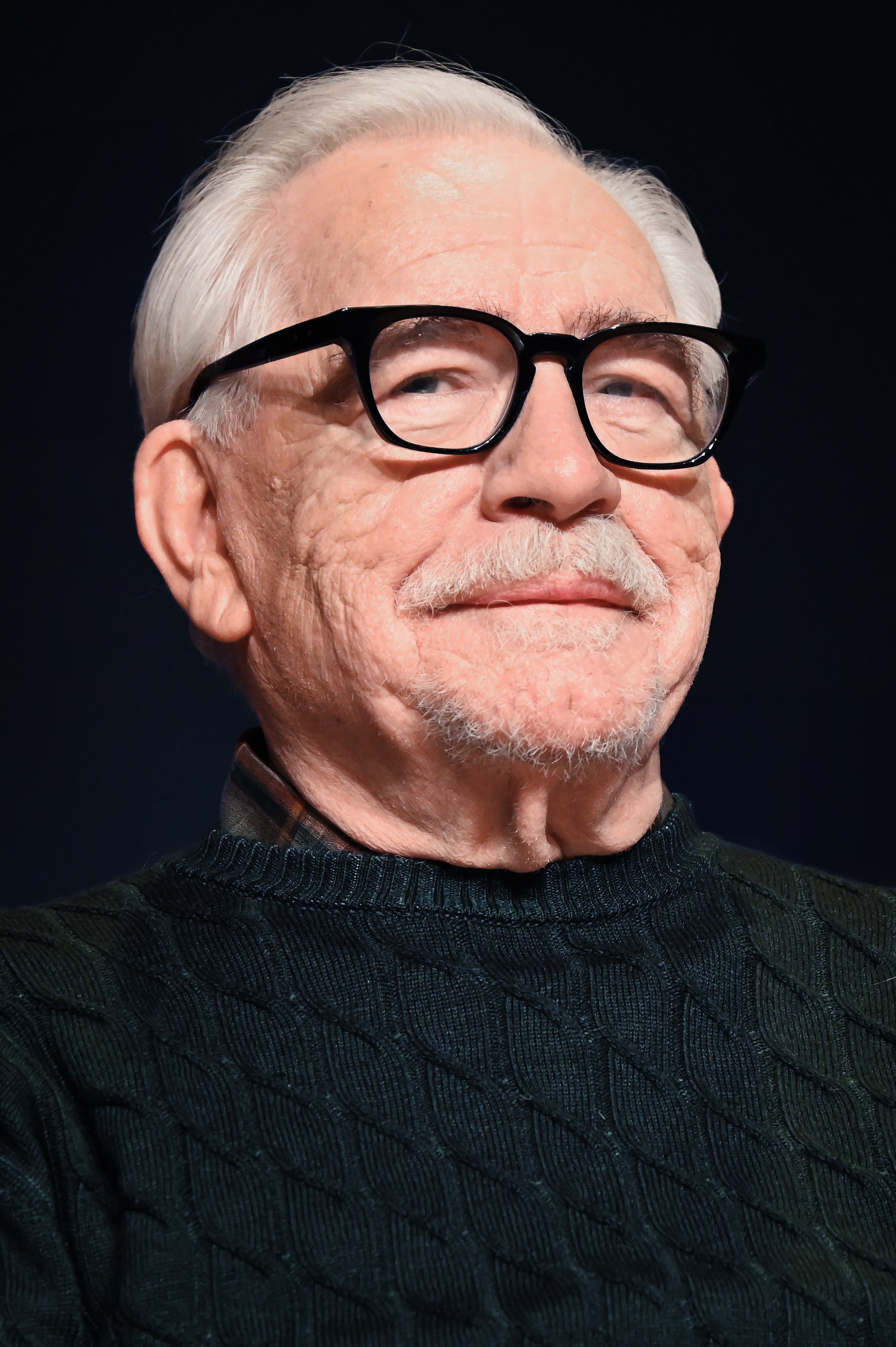
Brian Cox at New York Comic Con in October 2024

- Brian Cox as Helm Hammerhand:
  The hot-tempered king of Rohan who attempts to protect his people. Director Kenji Kamiyama was intrigued by the story of Helm's lineage ending, seeing it as a lesson about responsibility and power.
- Gaia Wise as Héra:
  The tomboy-ish daughter of Helm who helps defend their people. Wise said the character was closer to the female heroes from Hayao Miyazaki's anime films such as Nausicaä of the Valley of the Wind (1984) than Éowyn and Arwen, the "fully formed" female heroes in the Lord of the Rings film trilogy. Wise described Héra as rebellious and complicated.
- Luke Pasqualino as Wulf:
  The leader of the Dunlendings who seeks revenge against Rohan for the death of his father. Unlike previous antagonists in the franchise, Wulf is just a human rather than an evil wizard or dark lord. Producer Philippa Boyens felt this made him more interesting and more dangerous, and said the character was relevant to "a lot of the crises that we're facing today".
- Laurence Ubong Williams as Fréaláf Hildeson: Helm's nephew and successor to the throne of Rohan
- Lorraine Ashbourne as Olwyn
- Miranda Otto as Éowyn: A future shieldmaiden of Rohan who narrates the film

Additionally, the voice cast includes Yazdan Qafouri and Benjamin Wainwright as Helm's sons Hama and Haleth, respectively; Shaun Dooley as Wulf's father Freca, a Dunlending lord with Rohirric blood who attempts to claim the throne; Michael Wildman as General Targg; Jude Akuwudike as Lord Thorne; Bilal Hasna as Lief; and Janine Duvitski as Old Pennicruik. An archival recording of Christopher Lee was used for the voice of Saruman. Billy Boyd and Dominic Monaghan, who respectively played Pippin Took and Merry Brandybuck in the Lord of the Rings film trilogy, provided the voices for the Orcs Shank and Wrot.

== Production ==
=== Development ===
In June 2021, during 20th anniversary celebrations for the beginning of Peter Jackson's The Lord of the Rings film trilogy (2001–2003), film studio New Line Cinema announced that it was fast-tracking development of an anime prequel film with Warner Bros. Animation. This was intended to prevent New Line from losing the film adaptation rights for J. R. R. Tolkien's The Hobbit (1937) and The Lord of the Rings (1954–55) novels. The new film, titled The Lord of the Rings: The War of the Rohirrim, was being directed by Kenji Kamiyama and produced by Joseph Chou, both returning from Warner Bros.' anime television series Blade Runner: Black Lotus (2021–22). It is connected to the film trilogy's continuity, and co-writer Philippa Boyens returned from those films as a consultant and producer. She said an animated expansion of the franchise had been discussed for years before they settled on making an anime film. Jason DeMarco, Warner Bros.' senior vice president of anime, was also producing the film. Jackson and the film trilogy's other co-writer, Fran Walsh, were not officially involved, but Boyens used them as a sounding board for ideas, and they were being credited as executive producers by June 2024. Other executive producers include Sam Register, Carolyn Blackwood, and Toby Emmerich.

=== Writing ===
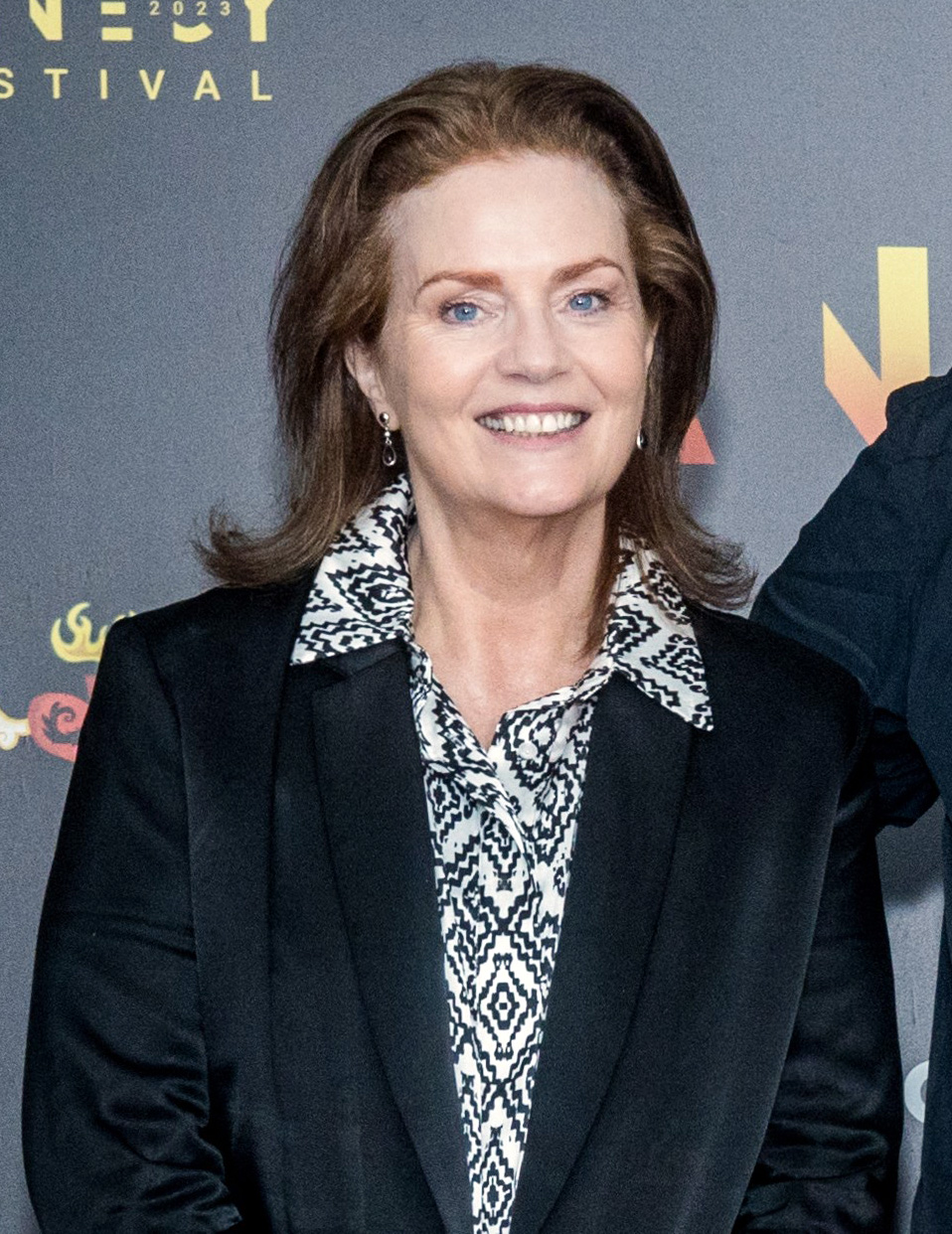
Producer and co-writer Philippa Boyens, returning from the previous Lord of the Rings films, at the Annecy Film Festival in June 2023

Several story ideas were suggested for the film, but Boyens insisted that they focus on the kingdom of Rohan as she felt that culture was best suited for the anime medium and would be familiar to viewers of Jackson's films. The War of the Rohirrim is set around 200 years before Bilbo Baggins finds the One Ring. It tells the story of Rohan king Helm Hammerhand who Tolkien mentions in the appendices of The Lord of the Rings, specifically the "House of Eorl" section in Appendix A which details the history of Rohan's rulers. The producers chose to tell this story because its setting earlier in the timeline avoids the villain Sauron and the influence of the One Ring, and because they thought the intensity of the conflict and the way it escalates made it the right choice for a film adaptation. Boyens said it allowed them to tell a tragic story about the "wreckage of war", and examine ideas of honor, revenge, family, and resilience.

Jeffrey Addiss and Will Matthews were hired to write the initial screenplay. During the COVID-19 pandemic lockdowns, Boyens asked her daughter Phoebe Gittins and Gittins's writing partner Arty Papageorgiou to re-write the script. Boyens referred to them as the franchise's "next generation". The pair, who were working on another project at the time, were hesitant to join the film because of the reverence for the source material and previous films held by themselves and other fans. They were convinced to join based on the other people working on the project, including many who worked on Jackson's films. This allowed them to focus on the storytelling and bringing the material closer to the styles of anime, Japanese cinema, and animation in general. Kamiyama wanted to include some details that did not fit within the initial script, including how to lay siege to a citadel. He worked with Gittins and Papageorgiou to put a focus on the darker, more claustrophobic, and horrific elements of the war rather than just large-scale battles. The director was also interested in the historical grievances that lead to the Dunlendings attacking Rohan.

The writers decided to introduce a narrator who would be telling the story as part of an oral tradition. The character Éowyn from the main events of The Lord of the Rings was chosen. Boyens said having a familiar voice in the film helped the writers with their work. She added that the narration gives context for fans of the previous films who are unfamiliar with Tolkien's wider Middle-earth history, and she felt framing the story as an oral tradition was fitting because it was being constructed based on fragments and references in the source material.

Tolkien gave details on the deaths of Helm and his sons, Haleth and Hama, but the fate of his unnamed daughter is left unclear. The producers decided to expand on her role, making her the protagonist. The first name suggested for the character did not start with "H", but Boyens thought it should start with the same letter as Helm, Haleth, and Hama. Walsh suggested they name her after Hera Hilmar, the Icelandic actress who starred in their film Mortal Engines (2018). For The War of the Rohirrim, the name is spelled "Héra" based on Old English. It was not intended to be a reference to the goddess Hera of Ancient Greek religion. The writers did not want to completely invent her characterisation themselves, and Kamiyama suggested they take inspiration from the historical female leader Æthelflæd since she played a similar role to Héra and Tolkien was himself inspired by such historical figures. They also took inspiration from Tolkien's other female characters, including Éowyn. Though the character can fight and ride horses like the men of Rohan, the writers were not interested in depicting her as a "warrior princess" which they said had become a common trope. They focused her character arc on the choices she makes and the choices that others make which impact her life.

Another character that was expanded on for the film is Fréaláf Hildeson, Helm's nephew who eventually inherits the throne. Only Fréaláf's mother is known, creating the possibility that his father is not Rohirric. Boyens believed going in this direction made Fréaláf's ascension more unlikely and differentiated him from the Lord of the Rings character Éomer who has a similar story. The inclusion of giant elephant-like Mûmakil in concept art for the film led to concern from some fans that it was inserting the armies of Harad into the story when Tolkien did not mention them. Boyens acknowledged that the appendices do not explicitly mention forces from Harad in this story, but said their involvement could be inferred since Tolkien mentions enemies of Gondor aiding the Dunlendings and elsewhere in the appendices he includes Harad as one of the enemies of Gondor in this time period. The writers also interpreted Tolkien's description of the Dunlending leader, Freca, as being wealthy enough to afford mercenaries from Harad as well as the Corsairs of Umbar, another enemy of Gondor.

=== Casting ===
Casting for the film began by the time of its announcement in June 2021, and details on the cast were expected to be revealed soon after February 2022. That June, Brian Cox was revealed to be voicing Helm, with Gaia Wise as Héra, Luke Pasqualino as Wulf, and Miranda Otto reprising her role as Éowyn from Jackson's films. Cox was previously part of the English voice cast for Black Lotus, and Boyens felt he was an appropriate choice for Helm based on his performance in a 1987 stage production of William Shakespeare's play Titus Andronicus. She praised Wise for bringing a "fiery-ness" to her performance without making Héra sound petulant.

Also revealed to be cast in the film in June 2022 were Lorraine Ashbourne, Yazdan Qafouri, Benjamin Wainwright, Laurence Ubong Williams, Shaun Dooley, Michael Wildman, Jude Akuwudike, Bilal Hasna, and Janine Duvitski. Their characters were revealed later, with Ashbourne voicing Olwyn; Qafouri and Wainwright as Hama and Haleth, respectively; Williams as Fréaláf; Shaun Dooley as Freca; Michael Wildman as General Targg; Jude Akuwudike as Lord Thorne; Bilal Hasna as Lief; and Janine Duvitski as Old Pennicruik. Additionally, The Lord of the Rings film trilogy actors Billy Boyd and Dominic Monaghan have small roles as two Orcs.

The Tolkien character Saruman appears in the film. An archival recording of Christopher Lee, who portrayed Saruman in Jackson's films and died in June 2015, was used for the character's voice. The producers received permission to use a recording of Lee from his wife Birgit Kroencke before her death in June 2024. They investigated casting an actor to imitate Lee's voice in case an appropriate archival recording could not be found, but Boyens was not convinced that any actor could match Lee and was pleased that they ultimately did not have to recast. The recording is an alternate take of a scene in Jackson's The Hobbit film trilogy (2012–2014).

=== Animation and design ===
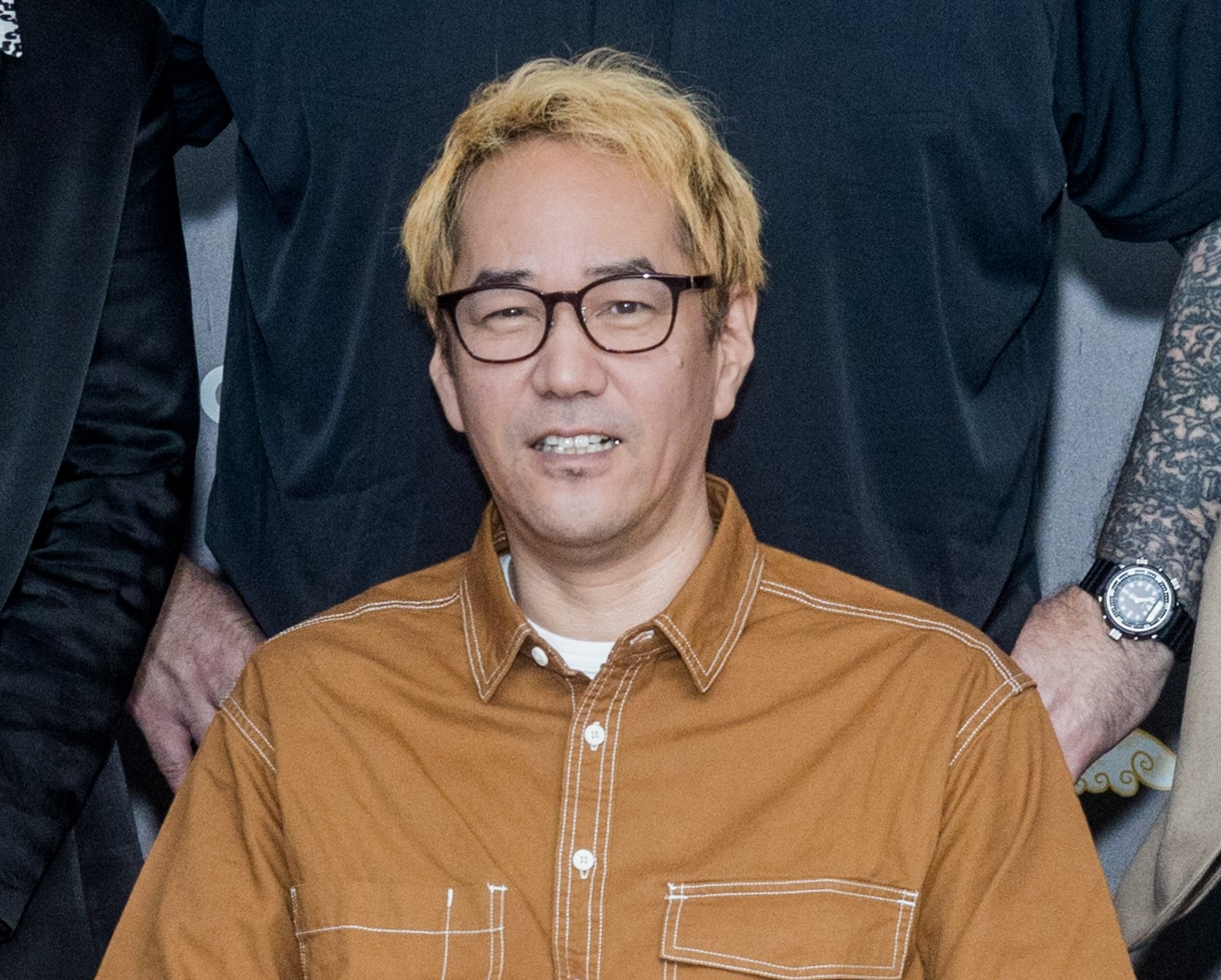
Director Kenji Kamiyama at the Annecy Film Festival in June 2023

Richard Taylor, the creative director of special effects company Wētā Workshop, and illustrators Alan Lee and John Howe all returned from Jackson's film trilogy to work on The War of the Rohirrim. The visual style was described as being based on that of Jackson's films rather than the style of the previous animated Lord of the Rings films by Ralph Bakshi and Rankin/Bass. However, the producers did not want to just make an animated version of Jackson's style and instead embraced anime, and Kamiyama's style specifically. Boyens said they also took inspiration from the works of Akira Kurosawa and Hayao Miyazaki, particularly their focus on small details. Kamiyama wanted the characters and locations to look as realistic as possible while still being recognisable as anime. Locations in the film that were previously seen in the live-action films include the Rohan capital of Edoras, their stronghold at the Hornburg which becomes known as Helm's Deep, and the fortress of Isengard. Old models from Wētā's archives were used as inspiration for some designs.

Sola Entertainment began work on the animation by the time of the film's announcement in June 2021. A unique approach was used to create the traditional 2D animation: actors performed every scene of the film using motion capture, which was translated into 3D animation within Unreal Engine's real-time game engine; the 3D environment was used to determine the camera angles and movements, and this was translated into the final 2D animation. Kamiyama did not want to use rotoscoping to trace over the 3D scenes. Instead, he asked the artists to use the 3D version as reference when creating their traditional 2D drawings. This process created more fluid movements but maintained the feeling of hand-drawn animation. One of the biggest challenges for the animation team was the large number of horses in the film; horses are important in Rohan culture but they are also notoriously difficult to animate.

By June 2024, the film was two-and-a-half hours long after originally being envisioned as a 90-minute film. More than 60 companies had been brought in to help finish the animation work, and Chou said it was the most difficult project that he and Kamiyama had worked on. He noted that a feature-length, hand-drawn animated film would typically take five to seven years to be completed and attributed the faster production time for The War of the Rohirrim to Kamiyama's unique approach and the involvement of creatives from the live-action films. Animation work for the film was completed by late October.

=== Music ===
Stephen Gallagher, the music editor on Jackson's The Hobbit film trilogy, was composing the score for The War of the Rohirrim by February 2023. He continued the style of composer Howard Shore's music for Jackson's films and reprised Shore's Rohan theme from the Lord of the Rings film trilogy. Recording for Gallagher's score began by March 2024 with the New Zealand-based Stroma ensemble, who provided wind and string instruments. Also in March, brass instruments and taiko drums were recorded at Angel Recording Studios in London; crumhorns and shawms were recorded at London's Air-Edel Recording Studios; and soloist Karen Bentley Pollick was recorded remotely in Mexico playing the Hardanger fiddle, which Shore prominently used for the music of Rohan in the films. Recording continued in May, including more sessions at Angel Studios and recording with the New Zealand-based Tudor Consort choral group. Recording in New Zealand, which also included harpist Michelle Velvin and singer Barbara Paterson, wrapped on 20 August. After further sessions at Angel Studios and Air-Edel Studios that week, recording for the score finished on 28 August. The sound mix took place at Park Road Post in Wellington and Gallagher completed his work on the film on 3 October.

An original song created for the film, titled "The Rider", was announced in October 2024. Performed by Paris Paloma, the song was written by Gittins and composer David Long. The latter also provided music for Jackson's films. "The Rider" was released digitally by WaterTower Music on 15 November alongside an official music video. A soundtrack album featuring Gallagher's score was released in December.

== Marketing ==
A first look at concept art for the film, showing the influence of Jackson's films on its visuals, was revealed in February 2022. Kamiyama, Boyens, Chou, and DeMarco discussed the film and showed unfinished footage at a panel during the Annecy International Animation Film Festival in June 2023. The footage received positive responses for its combination of Jackson's visuals and anime stylings; John Hopewell of Variety said fans of Jackson's films and fans of anime would both enjoy The War of the Rohirrim, and highlighted the brutal, bloody violence shown. Rafael Motamayor at /Film said it was one of the most anticipated animated films of 2024.

Jackson introduced, via video message, a panel for the film at the next Annecy Film Festival in June 2024. The panel was moderated by Andy Serkis, who portrays Gollum in the live-action films and had recently been announced as the director for The Lord of the Rings: The Hunt for Gollum (2027). Kamiyama, Boyens, Chou, and DeMarco again discussed the project and showed 20 minutes of footage from the start of the film. Motamayor praised the footage and said it felt like a "proper" prequel to Jackson's films. However, he said the combination of 2D characters and 3D backgrounds was not as smooth as in the anime series Attack on Titan (2013–2023). Kambole Campbell of Animation Magazine agreed, but attributed this to the animation being unfinished. He said some scenes "showed a lot more polish and precision" and praised the voice performances, particularly Cox's. At San Diego Comic-Con in July, Chou and DeMarco discussed the film during Tolkien fan website TheOneRing.net's panel. They showed footage and provided some of the first official merchandise to attendees of the panel.

The first trailer was released online in August 2024. It opens with footage from Jackson's films and Shore's music for Rohan before segueing into the story and visuals of The War of the Rohirrim. James Whitbrook of Gizmodo thought this "aggressive leaning" into connections with Jackson's trilogy was telling, but he also said the rest of the trailer looked "very cool" and brought an interesting new style to familiar visuals from Jackson's films. Matt Patches, writing for Polygon, said the trailer was gorgeous and believed the film would be bigger than Bakshi's 1978 animated The Lord of the Rings film. Jordan King at Empire called the trailer "jaw-slackening" and thought the film would live up to its name, while Amy West at GamesRadar+ said it looked "just as epic as you imagined". The Japanese version of the trailer revealed that the character Saruman would be appearing in the film.

More footage from the film was shown during a panel at New York Comic Con in October 2024. Moderated by television host and avid Tolkien fan Stephen Colbert, the panel featured Kamiyama, Boyens, DeMarco, Chou, Papageorgiou, Gittins, Cox, Pasqualino, and Wise. A motion poster inspired by artwork, maps, and music from the film was released online along with a video showing how it was created. Whitbrook said the footage shown at the panel "captures the aesthetic of [Jackson's] beloved movies down to a tee" but it was also putting "its own spin on things even amid the familiarity". /Film's Jeremy Mathai said the previously released footage did not do justice to what was shown at the panel, which he described as a combination of the political scheming of the series Game of Thrones (2011–2019) and "a dark and mature tone befitting Kamiyama's prior anime work". Following a trend of noteworthy popcorn buckets being used for films earlier in 2024, AMC Theatres announced a unique popcorn bucket for The War of the Rohirrim in the shape of a 27-inch (69 cm) long war hammer.

== Release ==
=== Theatrical ===
The Lord of the Rings: The War of the Rohirrim premiered in Leicester Square, London, on 3 December 2024. It was released theatrically by Warner Bros. Pictures in international markets from 5 December and in the United States on 13 December. The film was originally scheduled for release on 12 April, but was delayed to the December date due to other schedule changes caused by the 2023 SAG-AFTRA strike.

=== Home media ===
The film was made available on digital platforms on 27 December 2024, only 14 days after its theatrical debut in the United States. This fast turnaround was due to the low box office performance and competition for screens over the Christmas and holiday season. It was released on Blu-ray on 18 February. The digital and physical releases include featurettes that explore the making of the film. The War of the Rohirrim began streaming on Max on 28 February, and made its television debut on HBO on 1 March.

== Reception ==
=== Box office ===
The Lord of the Rings: The War of the Rohirrim grossed $9.2 million in the United States and Canada, and $11.5 million in other territories, for a worldwide total of $20.7 million.

In the United States and Canada, the film premiered alongside Kraven the Hunter, and was projected to gross $6–7 million from 3,500 theatres in its opening weekend. The film grossed $625,000 in Thursday night previews, and went on to debut to $4.6 million, finishing fifth behind Moana 2, Wicked, Kraven the Hunter, and Gladiator II.

=== Critical response ===
On the review aggregator website Rotten Tomatoes, 48% of 146 critics' reviews are positive, with an average rating of 5.7/10. The website's consensus reads: "This animated deep cut from The Lord of the Rings mythos has plenty of spectacle, but its clichéd characters and uneven animation resemble middle of the road more than they do Middle-earth." Metacritic, which uses a weighted average, assigned the film a score of 54 out of 100, based on 32 critics, indicating "mixed or average" reviews. Audiences polled by CinemaScore gave the film an average grade of "B" on an A+ to F scale.

Maya Phillips of The New York Times gave the film a mostly positive review, comparing it to a video game "side quest" and stating that "although parts of the story feel predictable or familiar—particularly character tropes like the stubborn ruler, the loyal knight exiled from the kingdom and the one-dimensional villain hellbent on revenge—the film does succeed at recreating the fantasy world we know and love, just in a new anime format". Zachary Lee, writing for RogerEbert.com, gave the film 2 stars out of 4, giving high marks to the voice cast and fight sequences but criticising the film's rushed execution and lack of depth, ultimately calling it "a ghastly imitation of the franchise's better films, a Ringwraith who possesses the frame and contours of something breathing but is ultimately hollow".

=== Accolades ===
The film was nominated for Outstanding Achievement in Sound Editing – Feature Animation at the 2024 Golden Reel Awards, for the work of Brent Burge, Martin Kwok, Matt Stutter, David Farmer, Hayden Collow, Alexis Feodoroff, Dmitry Novikov, Michael Donaldson, Craig Tomlinson, and Simon Riley. Stephen Gallagher was nominated for Best Original Score for an Animated Film at the 2024 International Film Music Critics Association Awards.
