= Maigret (1992 TV series) =

British television detective series (1992–1993)

- Genre: Crime drama
- Based on: Jules Maigret by Georges Simenon
- Starring: Michael Gambon; Geoffrey Hutchings
- Theme music composer: Nigel Hess
- Composer: Nigel Hess
- Country of origin: United Kingdom
- Original language: English
- No. of series: 2
- No. of episodes: 12

Production
- Executive producers: Sally Head; Arthur Weingarten; Rebecca Eaton (1992)
- Producers: Jonathan Alwyn; Paul Marcus
- Running time: 49–51 minutes
- Production company: Granada Television

Original release
- Network: ITV
- Release: 9 February 1992 – 18 April 1993

Maigret is a British television series that ran on ITV for twelve episodes between 9 February 1992 and 18 April 1993. It is an adaptation of the books by Georges Simenon featuring his fictional French detective Jules Maigret. It aired in the United States on Mystery!.

== Production ==
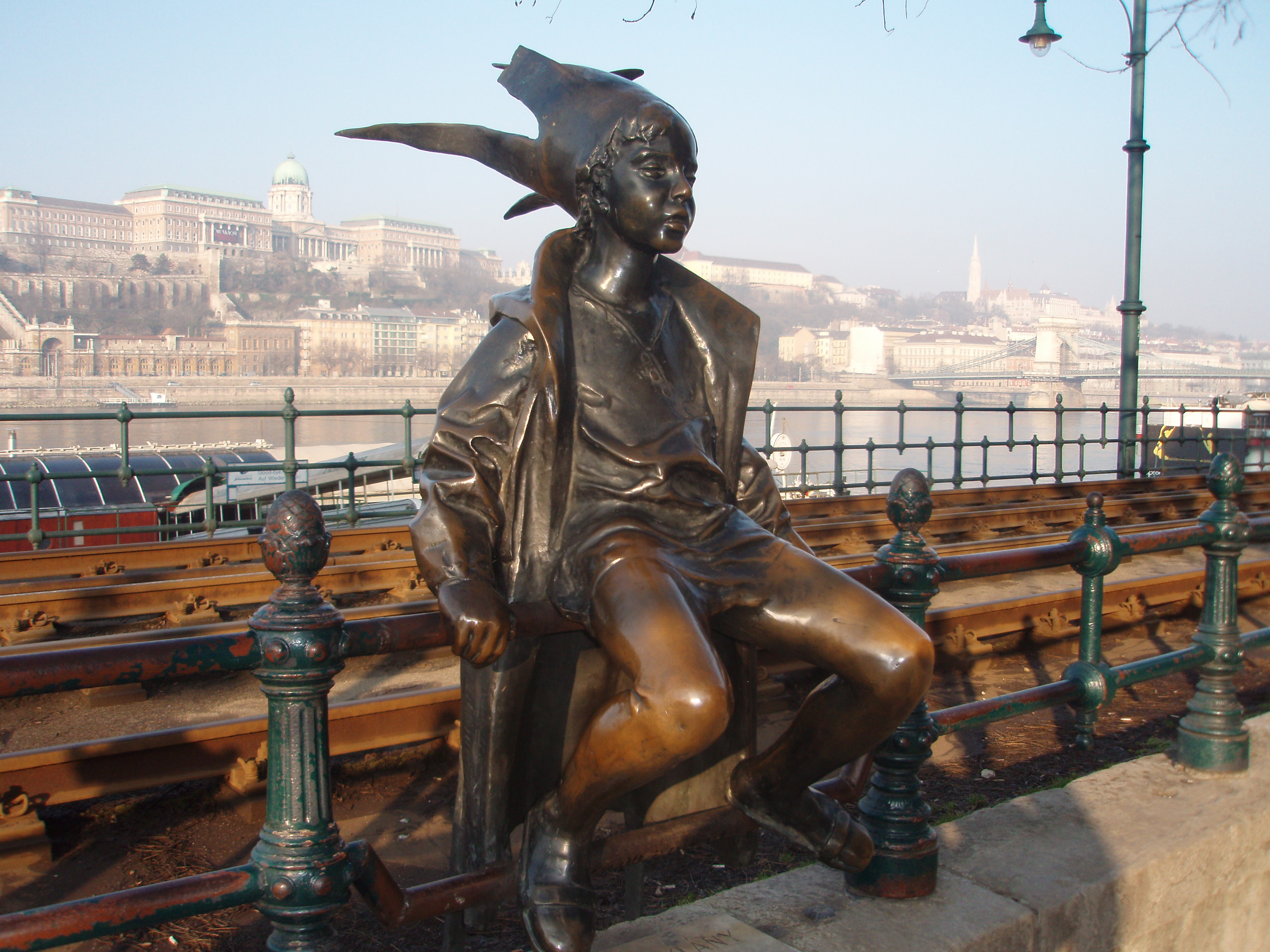
László Marton's sculpture in Budapest, Little Princess, appears in the opening episode of Maigret, a nod to the filming location

The programme was filmed in Budapest which doubled for post-WWII France. Airing in two seasons, each of the episodes was based on a single book. The series covered only 12 of Georges Simenon's 75 novels and 28 short stories about the detective.

== Cast ==
- Michael Gambon – Jules Maigret
- Geoffrey Hutchings – Sgt Lucas
- Jack Galloway – Inspector Janvier
- James Larkin – Inspector Lapointe
- Ciaran Madden – Madame Maigret (series 1)
- John Moffatt – M. Comeliau
- Christian Rodska – Moers (three episodes)
- Barbara Flynn – Madame Maigret (series 2)

== Episodes ==
=== Series 1 (1992) ===
Maigret Series 1
No. overall	No. in series	Title	Directed by	Written by	Original release date
1	1	"The Patience of Maigret"	James Cellan Jones	Alan Plater	9 February 1992
2	2	"Maigret and the Burglar's Wife"	John Glenister	Alan Plater	16 February 1992
3	3	"Maigret Goes to School"	James Cellan Jones	William Humble	23 February 1992
4	4	"Maigret and the Mad Woman"	John Glenister	William Humble	1 March 1992
5	5	"Maigret on Home Ground"	James Cellan Jones	Robin Chapman	8 March 1992
6	6	"Maigret Sets a Trap"	John Glenister	Douglas Livingstone	15 March 1992

=== Series 2 (1993) ===
Maigret Series 1
No. overall	No. in series	Title	Directed by	Written by	Original release date
7	1	"Maigret and the Night Club Dancer"	John Strickland	Douglas Livingstone	14 March 1993
8	2	"Maigret and the Hotel Majestic"	Nicholas Renton	William Humble	21 March 1993
9	3	"Maigret on the Defensive"	Stuart Burge	William Humble	28 March 1993
10	4	"Maigret's Boyhood Friend"	John Strickland	William Humble	4 April 1993
11	5	"Maigret and the Minister"	Nicholas Renton	Bill Gallagher	11 April 1993
12	6	"Maigret and the Maid"	Stuart Burge	Douglas Livingstone	18 April 1993

== Reception ==
Reviewing the debut episode, Variety called it "clever and soaked with procedure and atmosphere" and noted that the production values were "first class." Two decades later, USA Today called the program "the definitive version" when reviewing the DVD collection. The New Yorker agreed calling this adaptation "the best".
