= Maigret and the Minister =

Maigret and the Minister (French: Maigret chez le ministre) is a 1954 detective novel by the Belgian writer Georges Simenon featuring Jules Maigret of the French Judicial police. It was written in Lakeville, Connecticut in August 1954, and first published by Presses de la Cité 1955. The 46th in the series, it was first translated into English by Moura Budberg in 1969 as The Calame Report (and initially published under that title), and later translated in 2017 by Ros Schwarts.

== Synopsis ==
Maigret is asked by the Minister of Public Works, Auguste Pointe, to unofficially investigate the burglary of the damning Calame Report from his office. Very unofficially, for reputations lie in the balance and the ensuing scandals could change the government. The report was on the shoddy workmanship of a state orphanage which had collapsed, and Pointe's was the only extant copy, which was stolen within the day of his receiving it. Not only is the matter quickly is leaked to the press, initial leads point to a former Central Directorate of the Judicial Police (Direction centrale de la police judiciaire) detective turned private detective... Maigret's own branch.

== Adaptations ==
- High Politics, Rupert Davies, BBC TV, 22 October 1962
- Keishi to seifu-kōkan, 警視と政府高官 (High Government Officia), Kinya Aikawa, ABC, 14 April 1978
- Megre u ministra, Armen Dzhigarkhanyan, 1987 (age 52), USSR
- Maigret chez le ministre, Jean Richard, Antenne 2, 11 January 1987
- Maigret and the Minister, Michael Gambon, Granada TV, 4 November 1993
- Maigret chez le ministre, Bruno Crémer, 1 February 2002

== Gallery ==
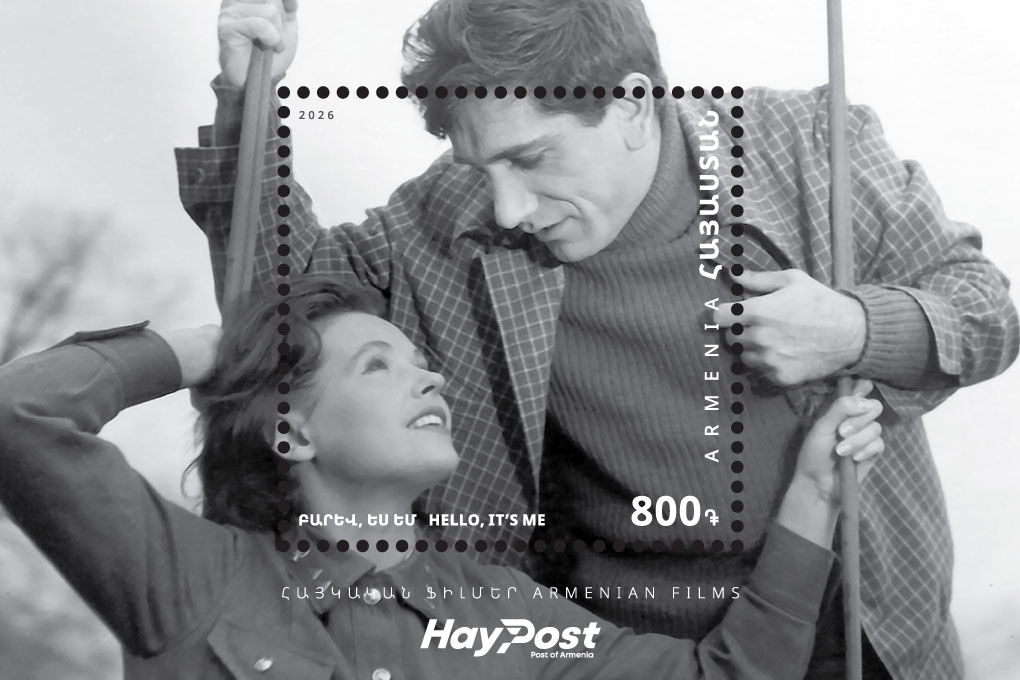
Dzhigarkhanyan on an Armenian commemorative stamp with his co-star in Hello, That's Me! (1966), age 31

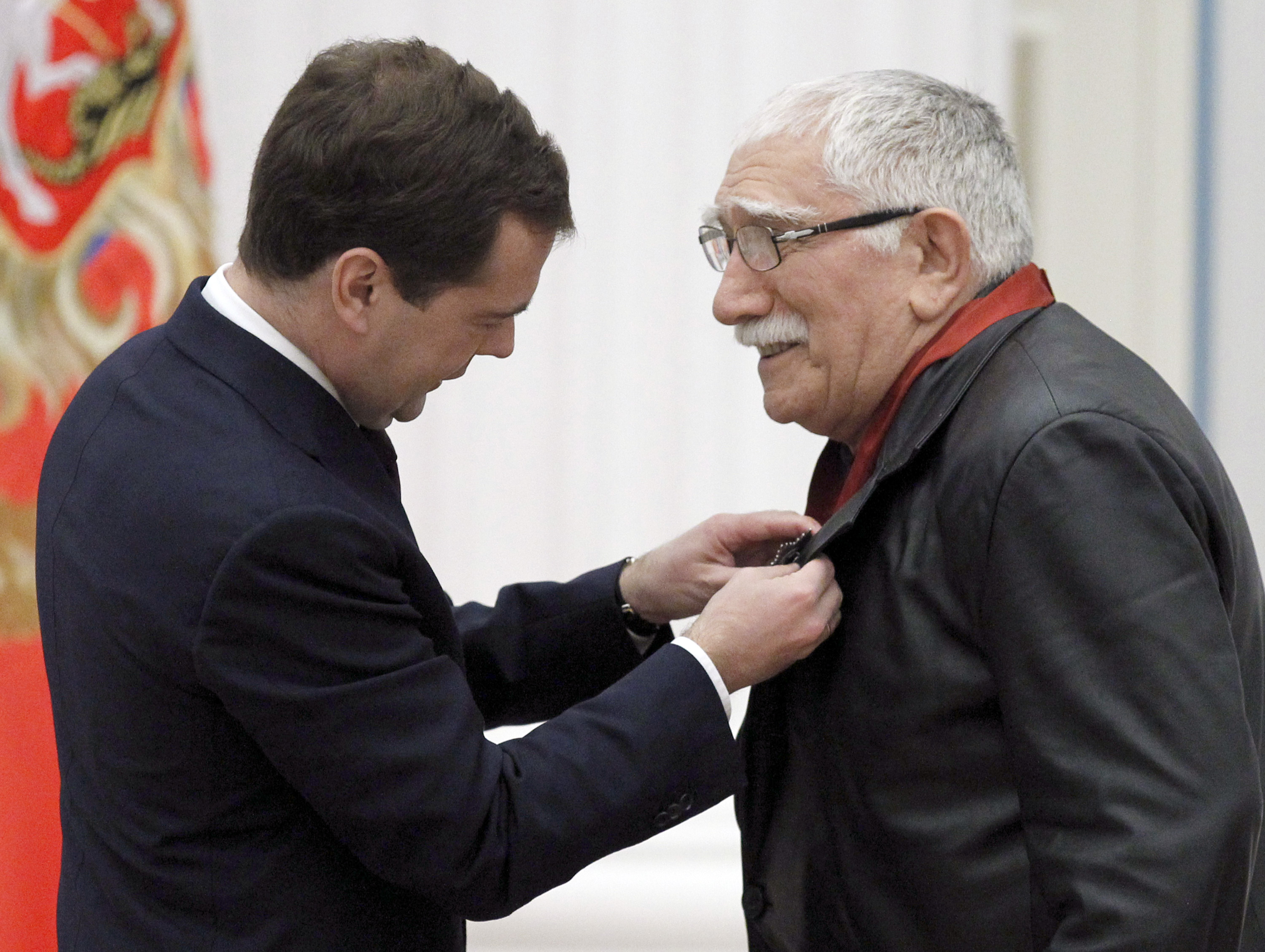
Dzhigarkhanyan being awarded the Order "For Merit to the Fatherland" 2nd Degree by President Dmitry Medvedev on 30 December 2010, age 85
