= The Flatshare (TV series) =

- Genre: Comedy drama
- Based on: The Flatshare by Beth O'Leary
- Starring: Jessica Brown Findlay; Anthony Welsh; Bart Edwards; Shaq B. Grant; Shaniqua Okwok; Jonah Hauer-King
- Country of origin: United Kingdom
- Original language: English
- No. of seasons: 1
- No. of episodes: 6

Production
- Executive producers: Miriam Brent; Rory Aitken; Eleanor Moran; Rose Lewenstein
- Producer: Rhonda Smith
- Cinematography: Laura Bellingham
- Running time: 45 minutes
- Production companies: 42; VIS

Original release
- Network: Paramount+
- Release: 1 December 2022

The Flatshare is a British comedy drama television series based on Beth O'Leary's 2019 novel of the same name. The series was developed by 42 in association with VIS for Paramount+. It premiered on 1 December 2022.

== Cast ==
- Jessica Brown Findlay as Tiffany Moore
- Anthony Welsh as Leon Campbell
- Gina Bramhill as Rachel
- Jonah Hauer-King as Mo
- Shaniqua Okwok as Maia Constantine
- Shaq B. Grant as Richard 'Richie' Campbell
- Dustin Demri-Burns as Phil
- Bart Edwards as Justin
- Klariza Clayton as Kay
- David Hargreaves as Mr. Prior
- Alis Waters as Holly
- Jo Martin as Pauline
- Bill Milner as Si
- Sophie Thompson as Katherine
- Juliet Cowan as Gillian

== Episodes ==
No.	Title	Directed by	Written by	Original release date
1	"Meet Cute"	Peter Cattaneo	Rose Lewenstein	1 December 2022
2	"On the Apps"	Peter Cattaneo	Rose Lewenstein	1 December 2022
3	"Valentine's Day"	Chloe Wicks	Sarah Simmonds	1 December 2022
4	"They F*ck You Up"	Chloe Wicks	Ryan Calais Cameron	1 December 2022
5	"First Date"	Chloe Wicks	Alex Straker	1 December 2022
6	"The Beginning"	Peter Cattaneo	Rose Lewenstein	1 December 2022

== Production ==
It was revealed in January 2020 that 42 had picked up the rights to adapt Beth O'Leary's novel. The adaptation was at the time in development with the BBC. In January 2022, Paramount+ officially commissioned the six-part series, marking the platform's first British comedy. The writing room includes executive producer Rose Lewenstein as lead writer as well as Sarah Simmonds, Ryan Calais Cameron, and Alex Straker. Peter Cattaneo and Chloë Wicks directed the first and second blocks respectively. Executive producers include Miriam Brent, Rory Aitken and Eleanor Moran of 42 with Rhonda Smith producing.

In February 2022, it was announced Jessica Brown Findlay and Anthony Welsh would star as the leads Tiffy and Leon. Also joining the cast were Bart Edwards, Shaq B. Grant, Shaniqua Okwok, and Jonah Hauer-King.

Principal photography wrapped in late-May 2022. Filming took place in Bristol, Brighton and London.

== Release ==
The Flatshare premiered in the UK, Australia and Canada on Paramount+ on 1 December 2022. It launched on the American channel Freevee in 2023.

In March 2025, the show began airing on 5, a British free-to-air channel; as well as all episodes being released onto 5, their ad-supported streaming platform.
