= Maigret on the Defensive =

1964 novel by Georges Simenon

- First edition
- Author: Georges Simenon
- Original title: Maigret se défend
- Translator: Alastair Hamilton
- Language: French
- Series: Inspector Jules Maigret
- Release number: 63
- Genre: Detective fiction
- Published: 1964
- Publisher: Presses de la Cité, Hamish Hamilton
- Publication date: 1964
- English publication date: 1966
- Media type: Print
- Preceded by: Maigret and the Ghost
- Followed by: The Patience of Maigret

Maigret on the Defensive (French: Maigret se défend) is a 1964 detective novel by the Belgian writer Georges Simenon featuring his character Jules Maigret. The novel was first published in English in 1966 by Hamish Hamilton Ltd., translated by Alastair Hamilton. In 2019, this novel was reissued in English by Penguin under the title Maigret Defends Himself (ISBN 9780241304068), newly translated by Howard Curtis.

== Plot ==
Maigret responds to a call from a young woman in the middle of the night, but he then finds himself accused of raping her. He is forced to clear his name, and search for what had really taken place that night.

== Adaptations ==
The story has been adapted several times for film and television. In 1993 it was made into an episode of an ITV Maigret series starring Michael Gambon.
