= Maigret and the Burglar's Wife =

1951 novel by Georges Simenon

- First edition
- Author: Georges Simenon
- Original title: Maigret et la grande perche
- Language: French
- Series: Inspector Jules Maigret
- Genre: Detective fiction
- Publisher: Presses de la Cité
- Publication date: 1951
- English publication date: 1956
- Media type: Print
- Preceded by: Maigret Takes a Room
- Followed by: Maigret, Lognon and the Gangsters

Maigret and the Burglar's Wife (French: Maigret et la Grande Perche) is a 1951 detective novel by the Belgian writer Georges Simenon featuring his character Jules Maigret. Maigret is spurred into action by a visit from a burglar's wife, former prostitute, whom he had arrested many years before. She informs him that a night previously her husband had been in the act of burgling a house when he discovered a woman’s dead body. Horrified, he had fled the scene, and then left the country - writing to his wife by letter. Maigret is inclined to investigate a wealthy dentist, who lives with his domineering mother, and has a Dutch wife who has apparently "gone away to visit her home country” - although Maigret knows he can prove nothing unless he can find the body.

It was translated into English and released in the United Kingdom in 1956.

== Adaptations ==
It has been adapted several times for television. In 1992 it was made into an episode of an ITV Maigret series.
