= Daphne Woodward =

Translator of French and German (1906–1965)

Daphne Woodward (1906–1965) was a British translator of French literature into English.

Woodward translated eight books in the Inspector Maigret series by the Belgian detective writer Georges Simenon. These were commissioned by Hamish Hamilton during the 1950s and 1960s and gained wider popularity through the Penguin Maigret series. They included Maigret's Failure (1962) and Maigret and the Enigmatic Lett (1963), a translation of the first novel in the series, Pietr-le-Letton, first published in 1931.

In the late-1940s she was secretary to the writer Arthur Koestler.

Woodward also translated books from German into English.
