= Benjamin Wainwright (actor) =

English actor

- Education: University of Leeds; Guildhall School of Music and Drama
- Occupation: Actor
- Years active: 2016–present

Benjamin Wainwright is an English actor.

== Career ==
He played the lead role of Frederick Trenchard in Julian Fellowes period-drama Belgravia: The Next Chapter in 2024. His credits also include Gangs of London, and BBC One series' World on Fire and The Split.

He has a voice role in The Lord of the Rings: The War of the Rohirrim. In September 2024, he started production in the title role of an adaptation of Maigret for PBS Masterpiece, based on Georges Simenon’s novels about Jules Maigret, a chief inspector for the Paris police. It has now been released on Masterpiece Theater in the US, with Wainwright filming a second series in 2026.

== Partial filmography ==
Year	Title	Role	Notes
2016	A Quiet Passion	Young Austin Dickerson	
2017	Holby City	Jamie	Episode: "The Hangover"
2018	Unforgotten	Ed	Series 3, Episode 1
2018	The Conductor	Frank Thomson	
2019	Endeavour	Adam Drake	Episode: "Apollo", as Ben Wainwright
2019	World on Fire	Randy	3 episodes
2022	The Split	Rory	Series 3, Episode 4
2022	The Sandman	Tavern Visitor	Episode: "The Sound of Her Wings"
2022	Gangs of London	Raphael	Series 2, Episode 7
2024	Halo	Gunnery Sargent Boone	Episode: "Sanctuary"
2024	Belgravia: The Next Chapter	Frederick Trenchard	Lead role; 8 episodes
2024	The Lord of the Rings: The War of the Rohirrim	Haleth	Voice role
2025–present	Maigret	Jules Maigret	Lead role; 6 episodes
2026	Vigil	Oli Pickford	Series 3; 5 episodes
