= Rupert Davies =

British actor (1916–1976)

Rupert Davies FRSL
- Portrait by Allan Warren of Davies from 1973
- Born: Rupert Lisburn Gwynne Davies; 22 May 1916; Liverpool, Lancashire, England
- Died: 22 November 1976 (aged 60); London, England
- Resting place: Pistyll Cemetery, Gwynedd, Wales
- Occupation: Actor
- Years active: 1940s–1975
- Spouse: Jessica Isobel Knowles (m. 1946)
- Children: 2
- Awards: British Academy Television Award for Best Actor (1962)

Rupert Lisburn Gwynne Davies FRSL (22 May 1916 – 22 November 1976) was a British actor best remembered for playing the title role in the BBC's 1960s television adaptation of Maigret, based on Georges Simenon's novels.

== Life and career ==
=== Military service ===
Davies was born in Liverpool. After service in the British Merchant Navy, he was a Sub-Lieutenant Observer with the Fleet Air Arm during the Second World War. In 1940, the pilot of his Swordfish aircraft in which Davies was aboard ditched into the sea off the Dutch coast, following which he was captured and interned in the Stalag Luft III prisoner of war camp. He made three attempts to escape, all of which failed. During his captivity, he began to take part in theatre performances, entertaining his fellow prisoners.

=== Acting ===
On his release Davies resumed his career in acting almost immediately, starring in an ex-prisoner of war show, Back Home, which was hosted at the Stoll Theatre, London. In 1959, he played the role of the Colonel in Alun Owen's The Rough and Ready Lot when it received its stage debut on 1 June 1959 in a production by the 59 Theatre Company at the Lyric Opera House, Hammersmith, as well as in the television adaptation which was broadcast that September.

He became a staple of British television, appearing in numerous plays and series, including Quatermass II, Ivanhoe, Emergency – Ward 10, Danger Man, Man in a Suitcase, The Champions, Doctor at Large (1971), Arthur of the Britons and War and Peace (1972). He also provided the voice of Professor Ian "Mac" McClaine in the Gerry Anderson series Joe 90. A pipe smoker, like Jules Maigret, in 1964, having released a 45 rpm single "Smoking My Pipe" late the previous year that capitalised on the Maigret opening sequence, he became the first person to win the Pipe Smoker of the Year award.

He was the subject of This Is Your Life in October 1962, hosted by Eamonn Andrews in central London.

Davies also played supporting roles in many films, appearing briefly as George Smiley in The Spy Who Came In from the Cold (1965). He also appeared in several horror films in the late 1960s, including Witchfinder General (1968) and Dracula Has Risen from the Grave (1968), as well as such international films as Waterloo (1970) and Zeppelin (1971).

=== Death ===
He died of cancer in London in 1976, leaving a wife, Jessica, and two sons, Timothy and Hoagan. Davies is buried at Pistyll Cemetery, near Nefyn, Gwynedd, Wales.

== Selected filmography ==
- Private Angelo (1949) (uncredited)
- Seven Days to Noon (1950) Bit Part (uncredited)
- The Dark Avenger (1955) as Sir John
- The Traitor (1957) as Clinton
- The Key (1958) as Baker
- Next to No Time (1958) as Auction Organiser (uncredited)
- Sea Fury (1958) as Bosun
- Violent Moment (1959) as Bert Glennon
- Breakout (1959) as Morgan
- Idol on Parade (1959) as Sergeant (uncredited)
- Life in Emergency Ward 10 (1959) as R.S.O. Tim Hunter
- Sapphire (1959) as Jack Ferris
- John Paul Jones (1959) as British Captain
- Bobbikins (1959) as Jock Fleming
- Devil's Bait (1959) as Landlord
- Danger Tomorrow (1960) as Dr. Robert Campbell
- The Criminal (1960) as Edwards
- The Spy Who Came In from the Cold (1965) as George Smiley
- The Uncle (1966) as David Morton
- The Brides of Fu Manchu (1966) as Jules Merlin
- Target for Killing (1966) as Kommissar Saadi
- Five Golden Dragons (1967) as Comm. Sanders
- Submarine X-1 (1968) as Vice-Adm. Redmayne (uncredited)
- Witchfinder General (1968) as John Lowes
- Dracula Has Risen from the Grave (1968) as Monsignor
- Curse of the Crimson Altar (1968) as The Vicar
- The Oblong Box (1969) as Kemp
- Waterloo (1970) as Gordon
- The Firechasers (1971) as Prentice
- The Night Visitor (1971) as Mr. Clemens
- Zeppelin (1971) as Captain Whitney
- Danger Point (1971) as Man
- Frightmare (1974) as Edmund Yates
- King Arthur, the Young Warlord (1975) as Cerdig, Chief of the Saxons

== Selected television roles ==
- Quatermass II (1955) as Vincent Broadhead (2 episodes)
- Sailor of Fortune (1955-8) as Various roles (20 episodes)
- My Friend Charles (1956) as Robert Brady (4 episodes)
- The Adventures of Aggie (1957) as Ollie Nickell
- Folio - The Unburied Dead (1957) as Canoris
- The Honourable Member (1957) as Robert Whitlock MP
- The Adventures of Charlie Chan (1957-8) as Inspector Duff (11 episodes)
- The Adventures of Robin Hood (1958) as Simon Dexter
- Ivanhoe (1958) as Brother Gareth
- The Adventures of Ben Gunn (1958) as Captain Flint
- The Invisible Man (1958) as Dushkin
- Armchair Theatre (1958–66) as Various roles (7 episodes)
- Interpol Calling (1959) as Coetzee
- The Flying Doctor (1959) as Frank Selby
- The Third Man (1959) as Inspector Arthur Shillings (5 episodes)
- World Theatre (1959) as Cook
- Suspense (1960) as Michael Crowe
- The True History of Passion (1960) as Caiaphus
- Maigret (1960-3) as Inspector Jules Maigret (All 52 episodes)
- Danger Man (1961) as Colonel Graves
- Festival (1964) as Chief of Police
- The Wednesday Play - The Big Breaker (1964) as Councillor Wally Cross
- Front Page Story (1965) as Felix Rackstro
- ITV Play of the Week - The Successor (1965) as Cardinal of Bologna
- Man in a Suitcase (1967) as Santiago Gomez
- The Champions (1968) as Voss
- Joe 90 (1968-9) as Professor Ian 'Mac' Maclaine (30 episodes)
- BBC Play of the Month - Maigret at Bay (1969) as Inspector Jules Maigret
- Never Mind the Quality, Feel the Width (1969) as Bishop Flynn
- Biography (1970) as Sir Almroth Wright
- Doctor at Large (1971) as Inspector Barker
- Man at the Top (1971) as Harvey Clayton
- Thirty-Minute Theatre - The Proposal (1971) as Lomov
- The Man Outside (1972) as Baker (13 episodes)
- War and Peace (1972-3) as Count Rostov (14 episodes)
- Arthur of the Britons (1972-3) as Cerdig (3 episodes)
- Orson Welles Great Mysteries - A Terribly Strange Bed (1973) as Lemerle
- Marked Personal (1974) as Dr. Jack Morrison (8 episodes)
- Father Brown (1974) as Colonel Arthur Druce
- Play for Today - The After Dinner Game (1975) as Bartley Humbolt
