= Orlanda (novel) =

1996 novel by Jacqueline Harpman

- Author: Jacqueline Harpman
- Translator: Ros Schwartz
- Language: French
- Genre: Psychological Fiction Novel
- Published: 1996 (Grasset) French
- Publisher: Seven Stories Press, Le Livre de Poche
- Publication date: September 4th, 1996
- Publication place: Belgium
- English publication date: 1999
- Media type: Print
- Pages: 294
- Award: Prix Médicis
- ISBN: 2246532116
- OCLC: 42049229
- Dewey Decimal: 843.914 21
- LC Class: PQ2668.A65 O7513 1999

Orlanda is a novel by Jacqueline Harpman published September 4, 1996, in Belgium by Grasset. The same year it tied for the prize, prix Médicis, with The Organisation by Jean Rolin. In 1999 it was translated into English by Ros Schwartz and published by Seven Stories Press.

== Synopsis ==
Aline is a thirty-five year old literature professor. One day when she was reading while waiting for her train, the masculine part of her soul, which she calls Orlanda has decided to leave her body. Her suppressed spirit chose a handsome young man called Lucien Lefrène, who was seated across from her, to inhabit. After having settled into this new body, Orlanda is going to discover new feelings and have new experiences. Aline would only understand later, when she re-encounters Orlanda that she is no longer "whole." She is swept up in a whirlwind of adventures where her hidden desires and facets of her personality will be revealed to her.

== Analysis ==
Orlanda references Orlando by Virginia Woolf both directly and plays with the novel through intertextuality. With the splitting of Aline's soul, Harpman explores Plato's theory of soul and the androgyne from the Symposium.

== Editions ==
- Éditions Grasset, 1996 ISBN 2246532116.
- Le Livre de poche, 1998, 248 pp. ISBN 978-2253144687.
- Seven Stories Press, 1999 221 pp. ISBN 1583220119.
