= Ros Schwartz =

English literary translator

Ros Schwartz is an English literary translator, who translates Francophone literature into English. In 2009 she was awarded the Chevalier d’Honneur dans l’Ordre des Arts et des Lettres for her services to French literature.

== Career ==
Alongside literary translation, Schwartz has served on the boards and committees of various literary and translation organisations: Vice-Chair of the Translators Association; Chair of the European Council of Literary Translators Associations (CEATL) from 2000 to 2009; Chair of the Advisory Panel to the British Centre for Literary Translation (BCLT) from 2005 to 2009; and Chair of English PEN's Writers in Translation Programme from 2010 to 2014. She has worked to develop literary translation as a profession by supporting young translators, initiating mentoring schemes, summer schools (e.g. Translate in the City, first at Birkbeck College, then at City University London), workshops and masterclasses (e.g. at Goldsmiths College, the University of Middlesex, Universities of Westminster, East Anglia, Bath, Warwick, Leicester, Glasgow and Manchester).

Schwartz has also written about literary translation: see, for example, "A Dialogue: On a Translator's Interventions", by Ros Schwartz and Nicholas de Lange, in Susan Bassnett and Peter Bush (eds), The Translator as Writer (Continuum, London and New York, 2006), and articles published in The Linguist, the ATA Bulletin, The ITI Bulletin, Context (nos 20, 21, 21 - Dalkey Archive Press), and the British Council literary translation website. She is a regular contributor to In Other Words, the journal of the Translators Association and the British Centre for Literary Translation.

She was also a consultant on the revised Robert and Collins French-English/English-French Dictionary; a judge for the Larousse "Grand Prix de la Traduction", Paris, 1995; and a judge for the Aurora Borealis Prize of the Fédération Internationale des Traducteurs 1999.

== Honours and Prizes ==
- 2009 - Chevalier d’Honneur dans l’Ordre des Arts et des Lettres
- 2006 - Shortlisted for the Duncan Lawrie International Dagger Award 2006 for her translation (in collaboration with Amanda Hopkinson) of Dead Horsemeat, by Dominque Manotti
- 2008 - Winner of the Duncan Lawrie International Dagger Award 2008 for her translation of Lorraine Connection, by Dominque Manotti
- 2013 - Longlisted for the Best Translated Book Award (BTBA) for her translation of Kite, by Dominique Eddé
- 2013 - Shortlisted for the Marsh Award for Children's Literature in Translation for her translation of The Little Prince, by Antoine de Saint-Exupéry
- 2016 - Winner of a PEN Translates and a PEN Promotes award for Sur ma mère, by Tahar Ben Jelloun
- 2016 - Winner of a PEN Translates award for The Meteorologist, by Olivier Rolin
- Honorary Member of the European Council of Literary Translators Associations (CEATL)
- 2017 - Awarded the 2017 John Sykes Memorial Prize for Excellence, by the Institute of Translating and Interpreting (ITI)

== Translations from French ==
Schwartz has translated numerous French and Francophone authors including Catherine Clément, Georges Simenon, Régine Deforges, Dominique Eddé, Dominique Manotti, Claudine Vegh, Emmanuel Raynaud, Aziz Chouaki, Fatou Diome, Yasmina Khadra, Julien Neel, Jacqueline Harpmann, Olivier Roy, Antoine de Saint-Exupéry. She recently produced new translations of classic favourites, such as Le Petit Prince and has been part of the international team re-translating the novels of Georges Simenon into English.

=== Translations: fiction ===
- The Blue Bicycle, Régine Deforges (W. H. Allen, 1985; Lyle Stuart, USA)
- 101 Avenue Henri Martin, Régine Deforges (W. H. Allen, 1986; Lyle Stuart, USA)
- The Devil is still laughing, Régine Deforges (W. H. Allen, 1987; Lyle Stuart, USA)
- Resting in Peace, Marta Caraion (2 Plus 2, 1986) – short story
- Black Docker, Ousmane Sembène (William Heinemann, 1987) – novel
- The Net, Ilie Nastase (W. H. Allen, June 1987) – novel
- Desperate Spring, Fettouma Touati (The Women's Press, 1987) – novel
- Return to Beirut, Andrée Chedid (Serpents Tail, 1989) – novel
- I Who Have Never Known Men, Jacqueline Harpman (Seven Stories Press, 1997) – novel
- The Passion of Women, Sébastien Japrisot (Crown, 1990)
- Extracts from novels by Agnès Desarthe and Marie Desplechin, in ExCITÉs (Flamingo, 1999)
- First Novel, Mazarine Pingeot (Harvill, 1999)
- In the Name of God, Yasmina Khadra (Toby Press, 1999) (under nom de plume Linda Black)
- Wolf Dreams, Yasmina Khadra (Toby Press, 2003) (under nom de plume Linda Black)
- (with Lulu Norman) The Star of Algiers, Aziz Chouaki, (Graywolf Press, USA, 2005; Serpents Tail, London, 2006)
- Belly of the Atlantic, Fatou Diome, with Lulu Norman (Serpents Tail, 2006)
- Kite, Dominique Eddé (Seagull Press, 2012) – longlisted for the 2013 Best Translation Fiction Book Award (USA)
- Kamal Jann, Dominique Eddé (Seagull Press, July 2014)
- The People in the Photo, Hélène Gestern (Gallic Books, Feb 2014)
- Zenith Hotel, Oscar Coop-Phane (March 2014)
- The Reader on the 6.27, Jean-Paul Didierlaurent, Mantle – Waterstones novel of the month, May 2106
- Sur ma mère, Tahar Ben Jelloun (Telegram, 2016) – Winner of a PEN Translates and a PEN Promotes award
- The Meteorologist, Olivier Rolin (Harvill Secker, 2016) – Winner of a PEN Translates award
- The Rest of their Lives, Jean-Paul Didierlaurnet, PanMacmillan, 2017
- The Book of Wonders, Julien Sandrel, Quercus, 2019
- I Who Have Never Known Men, Jacqueline Harpman, Vintage, 2019
- The Girl who Reads on the Metro, Christine Feret-Fleury, PanMacmillan, 2019
- A Long Way from Douala, Max Lobe (HopeRoad, 2020)
- Return to Beirut, Andrée Chedid (Serpents Tail, 1989) – novel
- Orlanda, Jacqueline Harpman (Seven Stories Press, 2025) – novel

=== Translations: drama ===
- A Little Grain of Sand, by Christophe Allwright – performed New Orleans 2002 and White Bear Theatre, London, 2004
- In Spitting Distance, by Taher Najib, based on the French translation from the Hebrew by Jacqueline Carnaud – selected for the 2012 HotInk festival in New York
- A Play: The Mating Game

=== Translations: children's books ===
- The Little Prince, Antoine de Saint-Exupéry (The Collectors Library, 2010) – Shortlisted for the Marsh Award for Children's Literature in Translation 2013
- Book of the Stars, Quadehar, Erik L’homme (Chickenhouse Publishers, Scholastic USA, 2003)
- Book of the Stars, Lord Sha, Erik L’homme (Chickenhouse Publishers, Scholastic USA, 2004)
- Book of the Stars, The Face of the Shadow (Chickenhouse Publishers, Scholastic USA, 2006)
- Martine (4 albums) (Casterman, Brussels, 2006)
- Jefferson, Jean-Claude Mourlevat, Andersen Press, 2020

=== Translations: crime fiction ===
- Dead Horsemeat, Dominque Manotti (in collaboration with Amanda Hopkinson) (Arcadia, London, 2006) – Shortlisted for the Duncan Lawrie International Dagger Award 2006
- Paris Noir (Serpents Tail, 2007)
- Lorraine Connection, Dominque Manotti (Arcadia, 2007) – Winner of the Duncan Lawrie International Dagger Award 2008
- Affairs of State, Dominique Manotti (Arcadia, 2009)
- Escape, Dominique Manotti (Arcadia, June 2014)
- 15 Maigret titles by Georges Simenon for the new Penguin Classics Simenon series:
  - The Shadow Puppet (2014)
  - Maigret Gets Angry (2015)
  - Maigret (2015)
  - The Madman of Bergerac (2015)
  - Maigret's First Case (2016)
  - Maigret's Holiday (2016)
  - Maigret and the Old Lady (2016)
  - Maigret is Afraid (2017)
  - Maigret and the Minister (2017)
  - Maigret in Court (2018)
  - Maigret and the Ghost (2018)
  - Maigret and the Good People of Montparnasse (2018)
  - Maigret in Vichy (2019)
  - Maigret and Monsieur Charles (2020)
  - Maigret and the Wine Merchant (2020)
- Betty, Georges Simenon, 2021

=== Translations: graphic albums ===
- Lou, albums 1, 2, 3, Julien Neel (Highland Books, 2007, 2008) – teenage graphic albums
- Lou, albums 4 and 5, Julien Neel (Highland Books, 2011) – teenage graphic albums
  - Lou! (1) Dairy Dates
  - Lou! (2) Summertime Blues
  - Lou! (3) Down in the Dump
  - Lou! (4) Romances
  - Lou! (5) Laser Ninja

=== Translations: poetry ===
- Metropolitain, Arthur Rimbaud (with Anthony Rudolf) in All that Mighty Heart, London Poems, ed. Lisa Russ Spaar (University of Virginia Press, 2008)

=== Translations: non-fiction ===
- Holy Virility, Emmanuel Raynaud (Pluto Press, 1982) – Sociology/history
- I Didn’t Say Goodbye, Claudine Vegh (Caliban Books 1984; E. P. Dutton, USA, 1985) – Interviews with Holocaust survivors
- Cuisine Extraordinaire (Conran Octopus and Mcgraw Hill, April 1988)
- The Reformation, ed. Pierre Chaunu (Alan Sutton, 1989) (co-translator) – history
- The Book of Inventions and Discoveries (Queen Anne Press, 1990, 1991, 1992)
- Women in Evidence, Sébastien Japrisot (Secker and Warburg 1991; Crown USA)
- Dining with Proust, Anne Borel, Alain Senderens (Ebury Press, 1992)
- The Gallimard Guidebook Series: Amsterdam, Vienna (Everyman's Library, 1993)
- Russian Art Collectors, Christina Burrus (Tauris Parke Books, 1994)
- Allah O Akbar, Abbas (Phaidon Press, 1994) (under nom de plume Linda Black)
- A History of Scientific Thought, Michel Serres (Blackwell, 1995)
- Pushing back the Horizons (Editions du Rouergue/Council of Europe, 1994)
- Skopelos, a brief study of vernacular architecture, Marc Held (1994)
- Nature, Artifice and Japanese Culture, Augustin Berque (Pilkington Press, 1996)
- The Mistress of Silence, Jacqueline Harpman (Harvill, 1996; Seven Stories USA)
- Orlanda, Jacqueline Harpman (Harvill, 1999; Seven Stories USA)
- Theo’s Odyssey, Catherine Clément (Flamingo, 1999)
- Visitor’s Guide to the Paris Musée d’art et d’histoire du Judaïsme (1999)
- La Prisonnière by Malika Oufkir and Michèle Fitoussi (Transworld, July 2000; Talk Miramax USA) – Oprah's Book Club selection
- Catalogue for the exhibition Paris en Relief, Musée Carnavalet (September 2000)
- Catalogues for the Toulouse Lautrec, Miró, Braque and Artists of the 20th century exhibitions held at the Basil & Elise Goulandris Foundation, Athens
- Chocolat mon amour, M. Richart (Somogy, 2001)
- Inside the Mind of Killer, Jean-François Abgrall (Profile Books, 2004)
- Alexander Villedieu’s Fountain Pen, Michel Guede (Editions la mesure du possible, Brussels, 2006)
- Iran and the Bomb, Thérèse Delpech (Hurst & Co., 2007)
- The Enigma of Islamist Violence, (co-translator), Amélie Blom, Laetitia Bucaille and Luis Martinez eds. (Hurst & Co., 2007)
- The Politics of Chaos in the Middle East, Olivier Roy (Hurst and Co. 2008)
- Beckett before Beckett (Souvenir Press, 2008)
- Holy Ignorance, Olivier Roy (Hurst & Co., 2010)
- Russie, l’Envers du Pouvoir, Marie Mendras (Hurst, 2012)
- The Crime of Jean Genet, Dominique Eddé (Seagull Press, 2016)
- Translation as Transhumance, Mireille Gansel – winner of a February 2016 French Voices Award
- Selfies, Sylvie Weil (Les Fugitives 2019)
- Edward Said: His Thought as a Novel, Dominique Eddé, Verso, 2019
