= Desplechin =

Desplechin is a French surname. Notable people with the surname include:

- Arnaud Desplechin (born 1960), French film director and screenwriter
- Édouard Desplechin (1802–1871), French scenic designer
- Marie Desplechin (born 1959), French writer
