= Nimier =

Nimier is a surname. Notable people with the surname include:

- Marie Nimier (born 1957), French writer, daughter of Roger
- Roger Nimier (1925–1962), French novelist
