= Translators Association =

Trade association in the United Kingdom

The Translators Association (TA) is the collective voice for literary translators in the United Kingdom. It is part of the Society of Authors (SoA), the UK trade union for professional writers, illustrators and translators, with over 12,000 members. The TA is a member of the European Council of Associations of Literary Translators (CEATL), which aims to improve the status and working conditions of literary translators.

== History ==
Established in 1958, the Translators Association (TA) provides expert advice and support to individual literary translators, representing the profession as a whole. It is committed to more openness and opportunities in publishing, more visibility of translators of colour and more proactive intervention to help dismantle the institutional barriers faced by early career translators.

The TA also administers prizes for published translations of full-length works of literary merit or of general interest from the following languages into English: Arabic, Dutch or Flemish, French, German, modern Greek, Italian, Japanese, Portuguese, Spanish, and Swedish (see full list below).

== Committee ==
The TA is overseen by a committee of eight elected members. The current committee members are Fiona Sze-Lorrain (Chair), Jane Davis, Kotryna Garanasvili, Ecre Karadag, Josephine Murray, Cecilia Rossi, Paul Russell Garrett (CEATL delegate), and Kathy Saranpa.

Previous committee members include Anthea Bell, Peter Bush, Robert Chandler, Charlotte Collins, Howard Curtis, Isabel del Rio, Rebecca DeWald, Kari Dickson, Marta Dziurosz, Ian Giles, Roland Glasser, William Gregory, Daniel Hahn, Rosalind Harvey, Nicky Harman, Rosie Hedger, Sawad Hussain, Ruth Ahmedzai Kemp, Vineet Lal, Natasha Lehrer, Antonia Lloyd-Jones, Christina MacSweeney, Ruth Martin, Anju Okhandiar, Clare Richards, Samantha Schnee, Ros Schwartz, Jamie Lee Searle, Trista Selous, Nichola Smalley, Deborah Smith, Ruth Urborn, Helen Wang, Shaun Whiteside (ex-officio).

The TA is coordinated by SoA officials Catherine Fuller and Ambre Morvan.

== Activities ==
The TA programmes translation events throughout the year and is a partner in the Literary Translation Centre at the annual London Book Fair. It also publishes a regular e-newsletter with news, events and opportunities, as well as guides on issues of interest to literary translators, and provides contract vetting and individual advice on publishing contracts.

== Recent campaigns ==
#Translators on the Cover

The campaign was launched in 2021 with an open letter of intent signed by authors and translators calling for translators’ names to appear on the front cover of translated works.

Statement on AI Training

The Statement on AI Training was launched by SoA in 2024. It has been signed by over 10,000 authors, translators and other creatives stating their rejection of the unlicensed training of generative AI models on creative work: “The unlicensed use of creative works for training generative AI is a major, unjust threat to the livelihoods of the people behind those works and must not be permitted.”

== Administered prizes ==
- The Vondel Prize (for translation from Dutch)
- The Schlegel-Tieck Prize (for translation from German)
- The Scott Moncrieff Prize (for translation from French)
- The Saif Ghobash Banipal Prize (for translation from Arabic)
- The Goethe-Institut Award for New Translation (for translation from German)
- The Hellenic Foundation for Culture Translation Prize (for translation from Greek)
- The Calouste Gulbenkian Prize (for translation from Portuguese)
- The Premio Valle Inclán (for translation from Spanish)
- The Bernard Shaw Prize (for translation from Swedish)
