= Translators' Professional Association (ÇEVBİR) =

Professional association for translators in Turkey

- Çevirmenler Meslek Birliği
- Abbreviation: ÇEVBİR
- Formation: May 2006
- Type: Professional association
- Headquarters: Istanbul, Turkey
- Region served: Turkey
- Affiliations: European Council of Literary Translators' Associations
- Website: cevbir.org.tr

The Translators' Professional Association (Turkish: Çevirmenler Meslek Birliği), abbreviated as ÇEVBİR, is a professional association representing translators in Turkey. Established in 2006, it works on copyright, contracts, working conditions and professional standards in literary and audiovisual translation.

== History and activities ==
The association developed from an informal network of book translators that began organising online in 2003. Before its formal establishment, the group prepared a model contract intended to provide a basis for agreements between translators and publishers.

ÇEVBİR has participated in public campaigns concerning translators' legal responsibility for the works they translate. In 2006, it joined publishing and writers' organisations in calling for an amendment to provisions of the Turkish Press Law under which translators could be prosecuted when the author of a translated work was abroad.

The association also issues guidance on contracts and rates. In 2021, it published recommended minimum rates for subtitling and dubbing translators and drew attention to insecure freelance employment in the audiovisual translation sector.

ÇEVBİR is a member of the European Council of Literary Translators' Associations (CEATL).

== See also ==
- Literary translation
