= Alain Ferry =

Alain Ferry may refer to:

- Alain Ferry (politician)
- Alain Ferry (writer)
