= Maigret (disambiguation) =

Maigret is a fictional detective created by Georges Simenon.

Maigret may also refer to:

== Arts and entertainment ==
- Maigret (novel), 1934 novel by George Simenon
- Maigret (1960 TV series), British TV series starring Rupert Davies
- Maigret (1988 film), a British TV film starring Richard Harris
- Maigret (1991 TV series), French TV series starring Bruno Cremer
- Maigret (1992 TV series), British TV series starring Michael Gambon
- Maigret (2016 TV series), British TV series starring Rowan Atkinson
- Maigret (2022 film), a French-Belgian film starring Gérard Depardieu
- Maigret (2025 TV series), British TV series shown in the U.S. as part of PBS Masterpiece starring Benjamin Wainwright

== People ==
- Louis Maigret, author of Traité de la Grammaire française in 1550
- Louis-Désiré Maigret (1804–1882), Roman Catholic bishop of Honolulu
