= A Long Way from Douala =

2021 novel by Max Lobe

- Author: Max Lobe
- Translator: Ros Schwartz
- Language: English
- Subject: Coming of age
- Genre: Literary fiction
- Publisher: Other Press
- Publication date: 26 October 2021
- Publication place: Cameroon
- Media type: Paperback; e-Book
- Pages: 208 (paperback)
- ISBN: 978-1-63542-174-3 paperback

A Long Way from Douala is a novel written by Cameroonian writer Max Lobe and translated by Ros Schwartz. It was published by Other Press in 2021. Originally published as Loin de Douala in 2018, it tells the story of Jean Moussima Bobé who journeyed with his best friend to find his elder brother.

== Background ==
The book was originally published in French in 2018 and translated by Ros Schwartz in 2021. It is Lobe's first novel to be translated into English. In an interview with European Literature Network, Schwartz noted that her translation for Lobe's story in Words Without Border and Fatou Diome's The Belly of the Atlantic could be reasons for contracting her to translate the book.

== Plot ==
The story follows Jean Moussima Bobé, a student University of Douala, who sets off with his best friend, Simon, to find his older brother, Roger who went to Europe to achieve his football dream. Unknown to Simon, Jean had a crush on him. On their way, they met Gazelle, a human trafficker and an insultive female police inspector.

== Themes ==
Themes in the novel include terrorism, child abuse, authoritarianism, migration, and homophobia.

== Style ==
Lobe deployed the use Camfranglais in conveying words in order to bring in the familiarity of travelling locally.

== Reception ==
Kirkus Reviews called it "[a]n entertaining, decidedly offbeat coming-of-age story." It was listed in Brittle Paper's Notable Books of 2021
