= Hakan Günday =

Turkish writer

Hakan Günday (born 29 May 1976) is a Turkish writer novelist and screenwriter. He was born on the island of Rhodes in 1976. He lived in Brussels as a boy, before moving to Ankara where he completed Tevfik Fikret High School. He studied in Hacettepe University, Université libre de Bruxelles and Ankara University.

His first novel Kinyas ve Kayra came out in 2000. Notable works include Loss (Ziyan), which won the Prix France-Turquie, and More (Daha) which won the Prix Médicis étranger.

Günday lives and works in Istanbul.

== Works ==
- Van’mourn and Chaira (Kinyas ve Kayra), 2000, novel
- Garfish (Zargana), 2002, novel
- Bastard (Piç), 2003, novel
- A Cautionary Tale (Malafa), 2005, novel
- Dismissal (Azil), 2007, novel
- Loss (Ziyan), 2009, novel 2014 Prix France-Turquie
- The Few (AZ), 2011, novel 2011 Best Novel in Turkey
- More (Daha), 2013, novel, 2015 Le Prix Médicis étranger
- Pronoun (Zamir), 2021, novel
