= Homéric =

French writer

Frédéric Dion (better known as Homeric) is a French writer, journalist and former racing jockey. He is best known for his books Oedipe de cheval (1992), Le loup mongol which won the Prix Médicis (1998), and Lady love (2003). He also published a book on racing titled Dictionnaire amoureux du cheval (2012).
