= La Dormition des amants =

2002 novel by Jacqueline Harpman

- Author: Jacqueline Harpman
- Language: French
- Published: 2002 (Éditions Grasset)
- Publication place: Belgium
- Awards: 2003 : Prix triennal du roman de la Communauté française de Belgique
- ISBN: 9782246631514
- OCLC: 49529621

La Dormition des amants is a Belgian novel written by Jacqueline Harpman. It was first published through Éditions Grasset in 2002. It won the Prix triennal du roman of the French Community of Belgium in 2003.

== Plot ==
This is a historical novel set in the seventeenth-century. Maria Concepcion (queen presumptive) is the daughter of King Carlos of Spain. While she is trained for ascendency, Maria treats her enslaved eunuch, Girolamo, with great compassion and he gradually becomes her playmate and confidant. Together, they learn reading, writing, and science.

In 1610, Henri IV was assassinated by Ravaillac. Édouard (a fictional king invented by the author) ascends the throne. Maria is to marry Édouard and become the queen of France. Girolamo comes with Maria to France and are inseparable; he even sleeps in a room next to that of the Queen. But their love can only ever be platonic.

Here we find a little myth of Tristan and Isolde.
