= Liberty Bar =

1932 novel by Georges Simenon

- Author: Georges Simenon
- Series: Inspector Maigret
- Genre: Detective fiction
- Publisher: Fayard
- Publication date: 1932
- Publication place: France
- Preceded by: Death of a Harbour Master
- Followed by: Lock No. 1

Liberty Bar is a 1932 detective novel by the Belgian writer Georges Simenon, featuring Simenon's character Detective Chief Inspector Maigret of the Paris Judicial Police. The plot involves Maigret's investigation of the murder of an expatriate Australian in Antibes on the French Riviera. The novel has been translated into English twice, adapted for television four times and adapted for the theatre twice.

== Plot ==
Detective Chief Inspector Maigret of the Paris Judicial Police is sent to Antibes to investigate the murder of William Brown, an expatriate Australian.

Brown had returned to his villa at 5:15 pm after a seven-day drinking spree when he collapsed and died of stab wounds to the back. His mistress, Gina Martini, and her mother, who both lived with Brown, buried him in the garden, then fled with the valuables from the villa. They were arrested after crashing Brown's car. After interviewing the Martini women, Maigret releases them from custody, provided they stay in Antibes.

Clues lead Maigret to nearby Cannes and the Liberty Bar: a small bar run by a middle-aged woman named Jaja. She tells him Brown regularly stayed at the bar for a few days, sleeping on the divan upstairs. He was once rich. On the day he died, he had left the bar about 2 pm. Sylvie, a young prostitute who also lives above the bar, had left five minutes before Brown. Maigret also meets Joseph, a waiter who is another regular at the bar. Maigret later learns that Brown had left Cannes in his car at 5 pm.

Brown's son Harry arrives from Amsterdam. He tells Maigret that his family owns the largest wool-exporting business in Australia. His father left his mother 15 years ago, although they never divorced. William moved to Europe and led a scandalous life, almost bankrupting the family business. The family won legal guardianship over William; Harry pays him an allowance of 5,000 francs a month.

The following day, Maigret tracks down Sylvie and Harry to a seedy hotel in Cannes. He stops Sylvie and threatens to arrest her if she does not cooperate. Harry casually acknowledges Maigret and walks off.

Maigret takes Sylvie to the Liberty Bar and finds 20,000 francs in her handbag. Joseph enters, and Maigret questions him. He denies being Sylvie's pimp and says she must have earned the 20,000 francs. Maigret arrests Joseph and Sylvie.

Maigret visits Harry in his luxury hotel suite. Harry hands him his father's will, which leaves much of his fortune to Jaja, Sylvie and the Martini women. His father had been challenging the legal guardianship in the Australian courts for 15 years, damaging the family's business and reputation. Harry had recently offered William one million francs to drop his legal action, but his father refused, saying he had made a will which would ensure further legal disputes after his death. Joseph came to Harry's hotel and offered him the will for 20,000 francs. Maigret leaves with the will.

Later, Maigret learns that Jaja has just visited Joseph and Sylvie in the police cells, then visited Harry. He interviews Jaja at the bar. Very drunk, she admits that William had told Sylvie, Joseph and her about the will. She becomes increasingly confused and distressed until she snatches a shard of glass and slashes her wrist. Maigret applies a tourniquet and calls a doctor. He orders the local police to bring Sylvie to the bar.

After treating Jaja's wound, the doctor finds she has heart disease and only has months to live. In Sylvie's presence, Jaja confesses that William was her lover. She suspected he was having an affair with Sylvie, so when he left soon after Sylvie on the day he died, she followed them. When she saw them meet at the seedy hotel, she bought a flick-knife and then stood in the middle of the road to Antibes and waited for him. When he stopped his car, she stabbed him.

Jaja falls asleep. Sylvie tells Maigret she loves Jaja and only had sex with William that one time because he had long pestered her for it. Maigret tells Sylvie that when Jaja wakes, she should tell her she had a bad dream, and Maigret has left for good.

The next day, Maigret hands the will to Harry, who promises to give each woman 100,000 francs in compensation. Maigret tells the local police that an unknown assailant killed William for his wallet. The case is closed. Maigret returns home and tells his wife the case was a love story gone wrong.

== Publication history ==
The novel was first published in French as Liberty Bar by Fayard in Paris in 1932. It was first translated into English by Geoffrey Sainsbury in 1940 and published as Liberty Bar by George Routledge and Sons in London. It was later republished as Maigret on the Riviera. A new translation by David Watson was published as Liberty Bar by Penguin Books (UK) in 2015 and by Macmillan in the United States in 2025.

== Critical reception ==
Reviewing the first English translation in 1940, New York Times critic Isaac Anderson wrote that most of the characters are not admirable by the standards of conventional morality, but Maigret manages to uncover some virtue in even the worst of them. He concluded that the novel shows "Simenon to be a master of the mystery craft and a keen and sympathetic student of human character." Barry Forshaw, writing in 2022, states that the novel is an example of a recurring theme whereby Maigret allows "his sense of pity to override his respect for the law."

== Adaptations ==
The novel has been adapted for television four times: in French as Liberty Bar (France, 1960) with Louis Arbessier as Maigret; in English as Liberty Bar (BBC TV, 1960) with Rupert Davies in the lead role; in French as Liberty-Bar (Antenne 2, 1979) starring Jean Richard; and in French as Maigret et le Liberty Bar (1997) with Bruno Crémer as Maigret.

The novel has also been adapted for the theatre twice: by Frédéric Walmain for the Théâtre Charles de Rochefort, Paris, in 1955; and by Charles Régnier for a production which premièred in Zurich in 1960.
