= Jean-François Josselin =

French writer and journalist

Jean-François Josselin was a French writer and journalist. He was born in Brest in 1939. He worked at the periodicals L'Express and Le Nouvel Observateur. He was the author of books such as L'Enfer et compagnie (Prix Médicis 1982), La Mer au large, Encore un instant (1992), and Les petites horreurs (1997). He also wrote a play in 1993, titled La fortune du pot, and a biography of Simone Signoret in 1995. He was a long-time participant in the literary TV show Boîte aux lettres, which was emceed by Jérôme Garcin and which ran on France 3 between 1983 and 1987.

He died in Brest in 2003.
