= Michel Rio =

French writer and novelist

Michel Rio (born 1945) is a French writer and novelist.

Born in Brittany, he was raised in Madagascar and currently lives in Paris. He studied semiology and published his first novel in 1972. Although he was well received by critics and has won several literary awards, he is still better known overseas (especially in the United States) than he is in France.

His works have been translated into many languages, and are mostly rather short. Recurring themes include man's relationship to nature, the ignoble elements of sex, themes from the Arthurian Cycle and suicide. Several of his books feature a writer named Jerome Avalon who questions the nature of writing as an art.

== Bibliography ==
- Mélancolie Nord (1982)
- Le Perchoir du perroquet (1983)
- Alizés (1984)
- Les Jungles pensives (1985)
- Archipel (1987)
- Merlin (1989)
- Baleine pied-de-poule (Play, 1990), first created on stage by the "Théâtre Moby Dick" company in 1992.
- Faux-pas (1991)
- Rêve de logique (essais critiques, 1992)
- Tlacuilo (Prix Médicis 1992)
- Le Principe d'incertitude (1993)
- L'Ouroboros (Play, 1993)
- Les Polymorphes (Fairy tale, 1994)
- Les Aventures des Oiseaux-Fruits (Fairy tale, 1995)
- Manhattan terminus (1995)
- La Statue de la liberté (1997)
- La Mort (une enquête de Francis Malone) (1998)
- Morgane (1999)
- Arthur (2001)
- La Remise au monde (2002)
- Script (Play, 2002)
- Transatlantique (Play, 2002)
- La Terre Gaste (2003)
- Leçon d'abîme (une enquête de Francis Malone) (2003)
- Sans songer à mal (une enquête de Francis Malone) (2004)
- Merlin, le faiseur de rois (2006)
- Malone, tome 1 (bande dessinée, dessins de Pierpaolo Rovero (2007)
