= Lock No. 1 =

1933 crime novel by Georges Simenon

- Author: Georges Simenon
- Original title: L'écluse no. 1
- Series: Inspector Maigret
- Genre: Detective fiction
- Publisher: Fayard
- Publication date: 1933
- Publication place: France
- Preceded by: Liberty Bar
- Followed by: Maigret Returns

Lock No. 1 (French: L'écluse no. 1) is a 1933 detective novel by the Belgian writer Georges Simenon, featuring his character Detective Chief Inspector Maigret of the Paris Judicial Police.The plot involves Maigret's investigation of the attempted murder of a businessman and the murder of a lock keeper at the Marne canal, Charenton. First published in French, the novel has been translated into English twice and adapted for television five times.

== Plot ==
Detective Chief Inspector Maigret of the Paris Judicial Police investigates the attempted murder of Émile Ducrau, owner of a transport company operating on the Marne Canal, Marne river and upper Seine. Ducrau was found half-drowned in the canal near Lock No. 1 at Charenton. He had a superficial stab wound in his back.

Ducrau tells Maigret he had dinner at home with his family on the night he was attacked then went for a walk along the quay. He does not remember the attack. He openly keeps a mistress on the second floor of his home and he dislikes his son-in-law, Captain Decharme. He says he is entitled to suspect everyone in his family of the attack.

Maigret visits the barge moored where Ducrau was rescued. "Old Gassin", an employee and old friend of Ducrau, lives on board with his daughter Aline. Maigret finds Aline in the cabin, breast feeding a baby. She tells him that Ducrau tried to visit her on the night he was attacked but she did not let him in the cabin. To Maigret, she seems simple-minded and distressed at the mention of Ducrau.

The following day Ducrau tells Maigret that Aline is 19 years old but has the mental age of 10. He had an affair with Gassin's late wife and believes Aline is his daughter. Last year Ducrau's son, Jean, spent three months travelling with Gassin and Aline on their barge for his health.

Ducrau learns that Jean has hanged himself, leaving a note saying it was he who attacked his father. The following morning, Bébert, the assistant lock keeper at Charenton, is found strangled to death at the lock. Ducrau tells Maigret he spent the previous night at a brothel. He has read in the newspaper that Maigret is taking early retirement the following week. He offers Maigret a job with a large salary but Maigret declines.

Maigret learns that Gassin has bought a gun, so he has him arrested. Gassin says he intends to kill someone, but he does not know who yet. He thinks he knows why Jean hanged himself, but he does not know who attacked Ducrau or who killed Bébert. Maigret allows Gassin to leave without his gun.

Ducrau invites Maigret to his weekend home at Samoir. When Maigret arrives, he finds Ducrau is worried about his safety and is armed with a Browning. At lunch Ducrau taunts Decharme for his debts, saying this gave Decharme a good motive for wanting him and his son dead.

Maigret privately suggests to Ducrau that someone killed Bébert because they suspected he was the father of Aline's baby. He also suggests that Gassin suspects Ducrau is the father and wants revenge. He further suggests that Jean killed himself and left a note incriminating himself because he was in love with Aline, suspected it was she who attacked his father, and wanted to divert suspicion from her.

At dinner Ducrau and Maigret see Gassin lurking at the gate. Maigret tells Ducreau that Gassin is armed. Ducrau confesses in front of his family and Maigret that he killed Bébert. It was Bébert who had stabbed him and threw him in the canal, because he had caught Bébert on the deck of Gassin's barge, spying on Aline undressing. He also held Bébert responsible for his son's death.

Ducrau brings Gassin inside and repeats his confession, but Gassin merely shrugs. Maigret puts Gassin in a bear hug and removes a stick of dynamite from Gassin's pocket. Ducrau says his friendship with Gassin was never the same after he had sex with Gassin's wife. He is not sure whether Aline is his daughter or Gassin's. After Maigret tells him he will probably be sentenced to two years in prison, possibly suspended, for killing Bébert, Ducrau invites everyone to stay the night, promising not to escape.

Next morning Ducrau and Maigret find that Gassin has hanged himself in the guest room. Maigret takes Ducrau to the Palais de Justice and charges him with Bébert's murder.

== Background ==
In the spring of 1928 Simenon and his wife Tigy spent six months exploring the rivers and canals of France in their boat the Ginette. Simenon drew on the world of canals, locks and barges for the novel. Finished in spring 1933, the novel was the last of the 18 required under his contract with his publisher Fayard.

== Publication history ==
The novel was first published in French as L'écluse No. 1 by Fayard in Paris in 1933. It was first translated into English by Margaret Ludwig in 1941 and published as The Lock at Charenton by George Routledge and Sons in London. It was later republished as Maigret Sits it Out. A new translation by David Coward was published as Lock No. 1 by Penguin Books (UK) in 2015 and by Macmillan in the United States in 2025.

== Adaptations ==
The novel has been adapted for television five times: in English in 1961 as The Golden Fleece, starring Rupert Davies as Maigret; in Italian in 1968 as La chiusa, starring Gino Cervi; in Dutch in 1968 as Maigret en de drie gehangenen (Maigret and the Three Hanged Men), with Jan Teulings in the lead role; in French in 1970 as L'Écluse N°1, with Jean Richard as Maigret; and in French in 1994 as Maigret et l'écluse n°1, with Bruno Crémer as Maigret.
