= The Flemish House =

1932 novel by Georges Simenon

- Author: Georges Simenon
- Original title: Chez les Flamands
- Language: French
- Series: Inspector Jules Maigret
- Genre: Detective fiction, Crime fiction
- Publisher: Fayard
- Publication date: 1932
- Publication place: France
- English publication date: 1940
- Media type: Print
- Preceded by: The Saint-Fiacre Affair
- Followed by: The Madman of Bergerac

The Flemish House; (French: Chez les Flamands), also known as The Flemish Shop, is a 1932 detective novel by Belgian writer Georges Simenon, featuring his character Detective Chief Inspector Maigret of the Paris judicial police. The plot involves Maigret's unofficial investigation of the disappearance of a young mother in Givet on the Franco-Belgian border. The novel has been translated into English twice and adapted for film and television three times.

== Plot ==
Detective Chief Inspector Maigret of the Paris judicial police is visited by Anna Peeters, a distant relative, who asks him for help. The police are investigating her family over the disappearance of Germaine Piedboeuf, a young woman who lives in Givet on the Franco-Belgian border. Anna and her mother run a grocery shop and bar just outside Givet. Anna's brother, Joseph, a law student in Nancy, had an affair with Germaine and is the presumed father of her three-year-old boy.

Maigret travels to Givet in an unofficial capacity as it is outside his jurisdiction. He interviews the Peeters family and learns that Germaine had visited them at about 8 pm on 3 January to complain about Joseph. Anna's sister Maria was there, but Joseph was in Nancy. Germaine had stayed about five minutes before Anna showed her out. Joseph's fiancée, Marguerite Van de Weert, arrived soon after. Germaine was reported missing the next day. Anna says people began accusing them because they are Flemish and have money. A drunk claims to have seen Joseph on his motorcycle on the night Germaine disappeared.

Inspector Machère of the Nancy police arrives and searches the water tank on the roof of the home. He finds a woman's handkerchief. He tells Maigret that the police are also watching the captain of the barge Étoile Polaire, who has a previous conviction for sexual assault.

Maigret questions Germaine's brother Gérard, who says Joseph had promised to marry Germaine after he had finished his studies. However, Joseph's family never accepted her and Marguerite's father offered Germaine 10,000 francs to leave the country. Maigret had found a photograph of Gérard in Anna's room. Maigret shows it to him and Gérard admits he had once had sex with her about four years earlier then broke off the relationship.

Machère and Maigret interview Gustave Cassin, the captain of the Étoile Polaire, who says that on the night Germaine disappeared he saw some people from the Peeters' house throw a long object into the Meuse.

Germaine's body is found in the Meuse 100 kilometres upstream. The postmortem shows she was killed by a blow to the head with a blunt object. Maigret searches Cassin's barge and finds a hidden package containing a hammer and Germaine's coat. Maigret takes the evidence but does not arrest Cassin. Cassin later disappears, and his clothes and a suicide note are found by the river.

Maigret goes to the convent school in Namur where Maria teaches and finds her bedridden. The mother superior says that the family scandal has worsened Maria's already poor health. She plans to become a nun when she recovers. Maigret returns to Givet and learns that Cassin was seen taking the train to Brussels at 4.15 pm that afternoon.

The next day Maigret learns that Gérard was heavily in debt and had stolen money from his employer. Machère tells Maigret that Gérard borrowed 2,000 francs the day before and was seen talking to Cassin just before Cassin disappeared.

Maigret confronts Anna in her room. She admits she killed Germaine because Joseph would have killed himself rather than marry her. Joseph later arrived and helped her dispose of the body. Cassin had seen them throw the body in the Meuse and he recovered the hammer and jacket. He told Gérard and he would give evidence against the Peeters for 2,000 francs. He also promised Anna he would leave the country if she paid him a large sum. Anna borrowed the money from Marguerite, who knew nothing of the murder. Maria was also innocent, but when she heard that Germaine was missing, she suspected the truth. Maigret tells Anna he won't arrest her because Machère is conducting the official investigation. However, he hints that she should leave Givet.

A year later Maigret runs into Anna in Paris. She says Joseph's law practice failed and he had to take a job with a law firm on a modest salary. Marguerite is pregnant and Joseph has turned to drink. Maria died before she could take the veil. Maigret has had no news of Cassin.

== Other titles ==
The novel was first published in 1932 in French as Chez les Flamands by Fayard, Paris. It has been translated twice into English: in 1940 by Geoffrey Sainsbury as The Flemish Shop( also known as Maigret and the Flemish Shop) and in 2014 by Shaun Whiteside as The Flemish House.

== Background and themes ==
Simenon's mother was of Flemish descent. The Peeters' shop and bar is partly based on a similar establishment that one of Simenon's aunts owned in his home city of Liège.

In the novel, Simenon explores the theme of a community divided by language and class: the Flemish speaking Peeters family refuses to accept Germaine Piedboeuf as part of the family, while the local population considers that the wealth of the Peeters helps them escape justice for a crime they have committed.

== Adaptations ==
The novel has been adapted three times for film and television: in English in 1963 as The Flemish Shop, with Rupert Davies in the main role; in 1976 as Maigret chez les Flamands with Jean Richard in the lead role; and in French in 1992 as Maigret chez les Flamands, with Bruno Cremer in the main role.
