= Maigret (novel) =

1934 detective novel by Georges Simenon

- Author: Georges Simenon
- Original title: Maigret
- Translator: Margaret Ludwig, Ros Schwartz
- Language: French: Maigret
- Series: Inspector Jules Maigret
- Subject: Crime
- Genre: Detective fiction
- Published in: France
- Publisher: Fayard
- Publication date: 1934
- Media type: Print
- Pages: 254
- Preceded by: Lock No. 1
- Followed by: Maigret and the Hotel Majestic

Maigret (also known in English as Maigret Returns) is a 1934 detective novel by the Belgian writer Georges Simenon, featuring the now-retired Detective Chief Inspector Maigret of the Paris Judicial Police. The plot involves Maigret's private investigation of a gangland killing for which his nephew has been wrongly accused. First published in French, the novel has been translated into English twice and adapted for television twice. It was the last Maigret novel issued by Simenon's first publisher Fayard.

== Plot ==
Maigret, the former Detective Chief Inspector of the Paris Judicial Police, is now retired and living in Meung. Early one morning he is awakened by his nephew Philippe Lauer, a junior detective who was inspired by Maigret to join the police. The previous night Philippe had been on a stakeout at the Floria nightclub in Paris, whose owner, Pepito Palestrino, was to be arrested for dealing in cocaine and involvement in the murder of a criminal named Barnabé. After the club had closed for the night, Philippe heard a gunshot inside and found Pepito dead. Panicking, he fired a shot, found the murder weapon and put it near the victim's hand, then bumped into a passer-by as he was leaving the nightclub. He fears he will be arrested for the murder.

Maigret and Philippe take a taxi to the crime scene where Chief Inspector Amadieu, Maigret's successor as divisional head, has already arrived. The passer-by, Joseph Audiat, identifies Philippe as the man he had seen leaving the nightclub. Philippe is suspended from duty.

Maigret goes to the Floria where he talks with Germaine Cageot, a criminal and police informant who he believes is the real owner of the nightclub and was involved in Pepito's death. After Cageot denies everything, Maigret leaves with Fernande, a prostitute who frequents the nightclub.

At Fernande's apartment, Maigret tells her he suspects Cageot and Pepito killed Barnabé. He offers her 2,000 francs to find evidence against Cageot. She goes to the Tabac Fontaine, a café near the Floria, where some associates of Cageot regularly play cards. She leaves with Eugène, one of Cageot's associates.

Philippe is arrested and put in custody. Maigret goes to police headquarters where he learns that Cageot knew about Pepito's imminent arrest. Cageot has also arranged for Fernande's arrest.

Maigret goes to Tabac Fontaine where he sits for 12 hours observing Cageot's associates, including Audiat and Eugène. When Audiat leaves just after 1 am, Maigret follows him. Audiat leads Maigret to a deserted backstreet where Eugène tries to run him over in his car but hits Audiat. Maigret treats the injured Audiat and tries to convince him to give evidence against Cageot.

Maigret convinces the chief of the Judicial Police to bring Cageot and his gang in for questioning. However, they deny knowing one another and are released. Maigret sees Fernande, just released from custody, waiting for Eugène by Eugène's car and realizes she is now Eugène's girlfriend.

Maigret goes to Cageot's apartment, ostensibly to offer him money to exonerate Philippe. As they negotiate, Maigret secretly wedges a small piece of wood under the receiver of Cageot's telephone. He has arranged for a detective and two stenographers to listen to their conversation on the other end of the line. Maigret says he knows Cageot ordered the murders of Barnabé and Pepito and is certain that Audiat will soon inform on him. Cageot says that Audiat is already dead and he has arranged for Eugène to be killed if he talks.

Eugène enters with Fernande, explaining to Cageot, who is now holding a pistol, that he had tried to ring him, but his phone was engaged. They see a police car pull up outside. Maigret fires at Cageot, hitting him in the hand and causing him to drop his pistol. Eugène jumps out the window and flees as two policemen enter the apartment. Fernande says they will never catch Eugène. She is proved correct: a month later she joins him in Istanbul where he runs a nightclub. Cageot is sent to prison. Philippe returns to him home town in Alsace.

== Background ==
In spring 1933 Simenon told his publisher Fayard that he intended to concentrate on his literary novels and would not write any more Maigret stories. Fayard agreed to publish a further literary novel (it had already published six) in return for one more Maigret novel. The new novel, Maigret, was published in March 1934. By then, Simenon had contracted with Gallimard to publish his future novels. (Note: Simenon signed the contract with Gallimard in October 1933, but it did not take effect until 1934.) Simenon published a number of short stories featuring Maigret from 1936, but his next Maigret novels, written from 1939 to 1940, were not published by Gallimard until October 1942.

== Publication history ==
The novel Maigret first appeared in serial form in the French newspaper La Presse from February 20 to March 15, 1934. It was first published in book form in French as Maigret by Fayard in Paris in March 1934. It was first translated into English by Margaret Ludwig in 1941 and published as Maigret Returns by George Routledge and Sons in London and in the collection Maigret Sits It Out by Harcourt, Brace & Co. in New York. A new translation by Ros Schwartz was published as Maigret by Penguin Books (UK) in 2015 and by Macmillan in the United States in 2026.

== Adaptations ==
The novel has been adapted for television twice: in French in 1970 as Maigret, starring Jean Richard in the title role; and in Italian in 1972 as Maigret và in pensione, starring Gino Cervi.

== Reviews ==
The anonymous reviewer in the 1942 New York Times Book Review stated that despite Maigret spending much time sitting around in cafés, "...for those who are interested in the workings of the underworld mind it [the novel] has a fascination that is difficult to define."
