= Nathalie Azoulai =

French writer

Nathalie Azoulai is a French writer. She was born on September 9, 1966. She studied at the École Normale Supérieure, and currently lives in Paris. The author of several books, she is best known for her novel Titus n’aimait pas Bérénice which won the Prix Médicis in 2015.

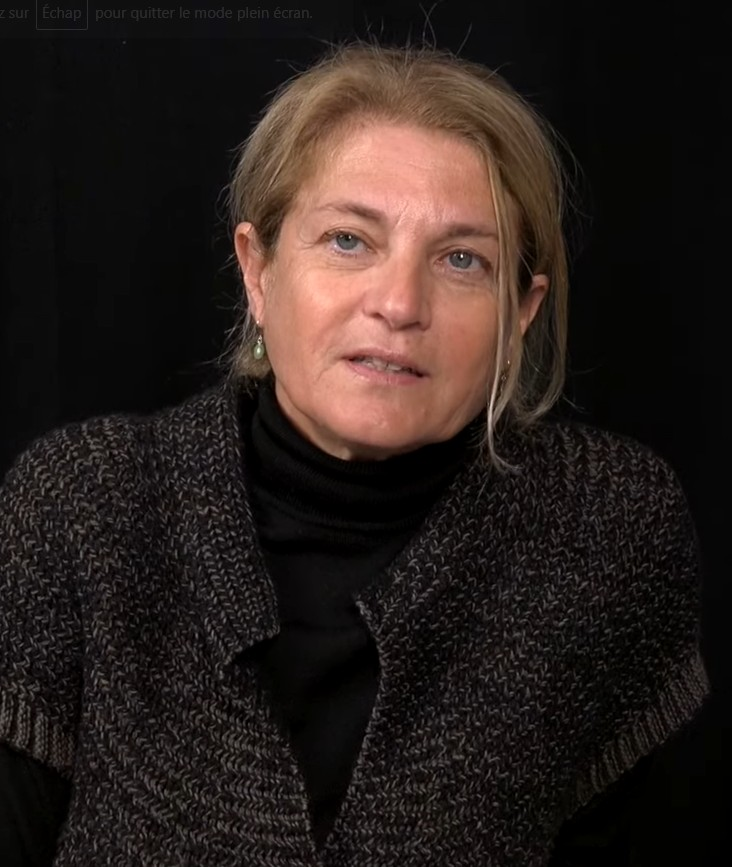
Nathalie Azoulai during an interview with the Mollat bookstore

== Education and Career ==
She graduated from École Normale Supérieure of St Cloud where she studied Modern Literature.

Her first novel, Mother Restless, was published in 2002. She published Girls Grew Up in 2010. Both novels were inspired by her own experience with her two daughters.
