= Frédéric Pajak =

French illustrator and writer (born 1955)

Frédéric Pajak (born 1955) is a French illustrator and writer. He was born in Hauts-de-Seine. He is the first author to win the Prix Médicis Essai for non-fiction with a graphic work.

He pioneered the genre of the graphic essay with L'immense solitude (Presses universitaires de France, 1999), a work which won the Prix Michel Dentan in Switzerland. He has published more than 20 books, including the annual series Manifeste incertain (Les Éditions Noir sur Blanc), which he began in 2012. The work is a melange of autobiography, essay and poetry, and won Pajak the Prix Médicis.

He is also a filmmaker, and the creator of such works as En souvenir du monde, Aubrun, l'absolue peinture and L'Art du dessin.

== Biography ==
Frédéric Pajak was born on December 10, 1955, in Suresnes, in the Hauts-de-Seine department. He is the son of painter Jacques Pajak and a teacher.

In 1987, Frédéric Pajak published a novel, Le Bon Larron, with Bernard Campiche éditeur. L'Immense Solitude, published in 1999, is the work that brought him to prominence. With this book, which received the Prix Dentan in 2000, Pajak invented an original form: the text and drawings are so closely intertwined that they must be read together. It is neither an illustrated book nor a comic book, but a fascinating and powerful combination of words and images, which mirror each other.

In 2000, he portrayed the poet Guillaume Apollinaire in Le Chagrin d'amour, a book in the same vein as L'Immense Solitude. In 2001, he published Humour, a biography of James Joyce, in collaboration with Yves Tenret.

In spring 2006, he published a novel with Éditions Gallimard, La Guerre sexuelle (The Sex War), followed by the short story Autoportrait (Self-Portrait) (2007), also with the same publisher.

He has launched numerous magazines, including L'Imbécile de Paris, and publishes the Les Cahiers dessinés collection with Buchet/Chastel, bringing together painters, illustrators, and comic book authors.

He won the 2014 Médicis Prize for non-fiction for the third volume of Manifeste incertain. In 2021, he also won the Swiss Grand Prize for Literature for his entire body of work.

In 2022, he made a film about the life of Mix & Remix, entitled L'Ami. Portrait of Mix & Remix.
