= Alain Ferry (writer) =

French professor and writer

Alain Ferry (17 December 1939, Bône in French Algeria) is a French professor and writer, recipient of the 2009 edition of the prix Médicis essai for his novel Mémoire d'un fou d'Emma, drawn from Madame Bovary by Gustave Flaubert.

== Bibliography ==
- 1978: El-Kous : éthopée d'un pied-noir, tale, Paris, Éditions du Seuil
- 1983: Le Devoir de rédaction, novel, Arles, Actes Sud
- 1995: La Mer des mamelles : roman d'amour ès-lettres avec des post-scriptum, Paris, Le Seuil
- 2009: Mémoire d'un fou d'Emma, essay, Le Seuil
- 2013: Rhapsodie pour un librique défunt, novel, Rennes, Éditions Apogée
- 2014: Le Livre de Marie-Anne, novel, Éditions des Équateurs
- 2014: Le Fils d’Étienne, novel, Rennes, Apogée
