= Emmanuelle Pireyre =

French writer (born 1969)

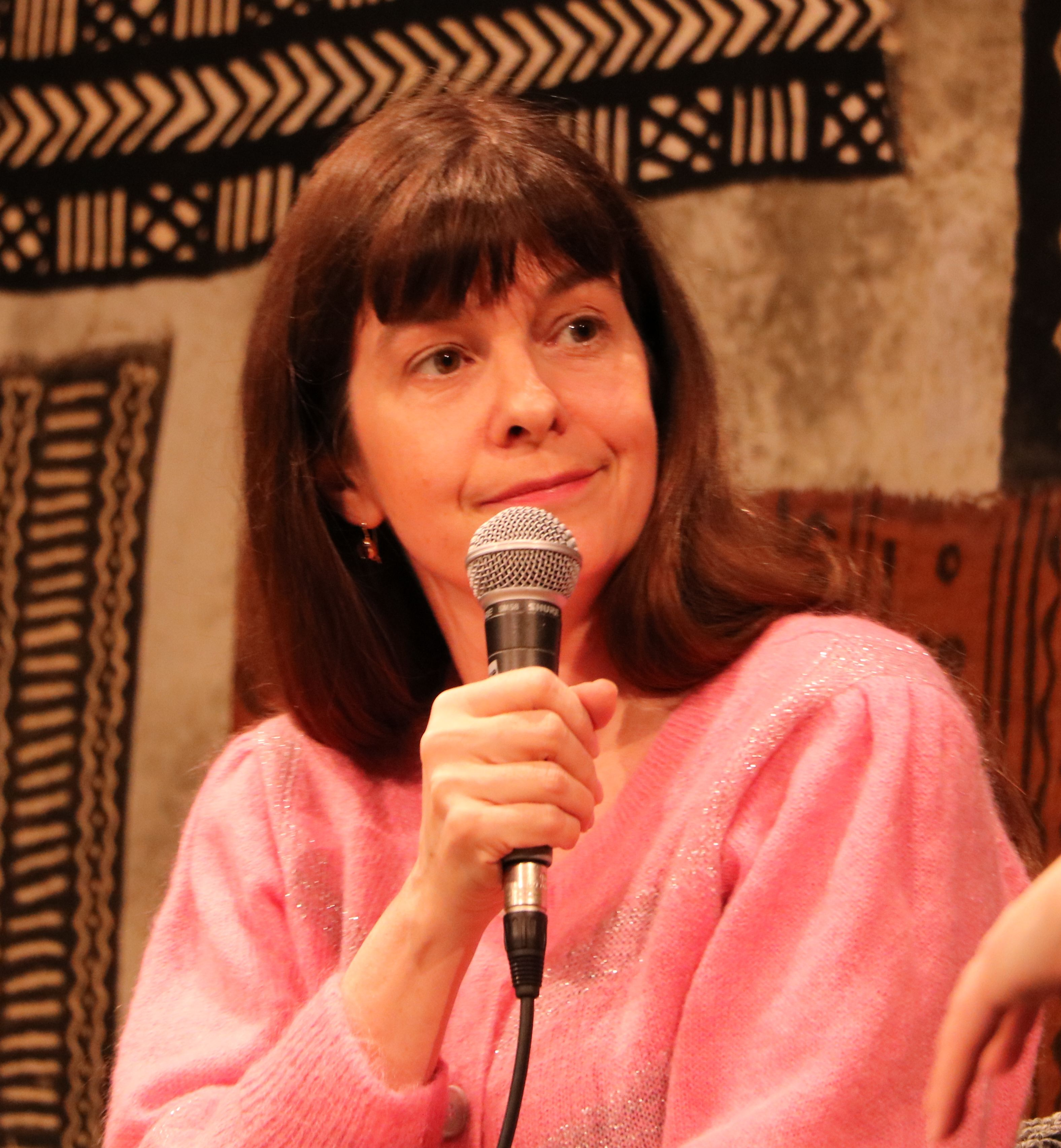
Emmanuelle Pireyre

Emmanuelle Pireyre is a French writer. She was born in Clermont-Ferrand in 1969. She was first published in 1995. She is best known for her 2012 book Féerie générale which won the Prix Médicis. She now lives in Lyon.
