= The Misty Harbour =

1932 novel by Georges Simenon

- Author: Georges Simenon
- Original title: French: Le Port des brumes
- Language: French
- Series: Inspector Jules Maigret
- Genre: Detective fiction, Crime fiction
- Publisher: Fayard
- Publication date: 1932
- Publication place: France
- English publication date: 1941
- Media type: Print
- Preceded by: The Madman of Bergerac
- Followed by: Liberty Bar

The Misty Harbour (French: Le Port des brumes), also known is English as Death of a Harbour Master, is a 1932 detective novel by Belgian writer Georges Simenon, featuring his character Detective Chief Inspector Maigret of the Paris Judicial Police. The story concerns Maigret's investigation of the murder of the harbourmaster of the port of Ouistreham in Normandy, France.

The novel was fist published in French in 1932. It has been translated into English twice and adapted for television three times.

== Plot ==
A man is found wandering in Paris. He is unable to speak, responds to questions with a vacant smile, and has recently had surgery for a bullet wound to the skull. He is identified as Yves Joris, the harbourmaster at Ouistreham, Normandy. His housekeeper, Julie Legrand, says he had been missing for six weeks. Detective Chief Inspector Maigret of the Paris Judicial Police accompanies Julie and Joris to Ouistreham. He finds that someone has recently transferred 300,000 francs into Joris's bank account.

The following morning Joris is found dead in his cottage – poisoned by strychnine. Maigret learns that Joris had once been the captain of a ship owned by the mayor, Ernest Grandmaison. Maigret finds Joris's will leaving almost everything to Julie. Julie denies poisoning Joris.

Maigret learns that Julie's brother, Louis, is a sailor on the schooner Saint-Michel which was in the harbour the night Joris disappeared. Some locals claim they saw Louis yesterday even though his ship is in Fécamp.

The Saint-Michel arrives that evening. After questioning the crew, Maigret allows it to sail to Caen. Louis stays in Ouistreham, and Maigret finds evidence that someone else secretly left the boat.

The next day Maigret sends for Sergeant Lucas. Julie tells Maigret that before Joris's disappearance, a rich man had asked Louis to procure a boat for him. The captain of the Saint-Michel subsequently agreed to sell it to Louis.

Lucas follows a suspicious man to the mayor's house but loses him. Maigret discovers that the man is Jean Martineau who is now on his way to Paris. Earlier that day Madame Grandmaison had also gone to Paris. He asks the local police to arrest Martineau.

Maigret and Lucas enter the mayor's home and find that Louis has been beating him. The mayor refuses to lodge a complaint against Louis but threatens to report Maigret for illegal entry. Maigret discovers that Madame Grandmaison has left Paris. The police find Martineau and take him to Maigret. Martineau tells Maigret he is a naturalised Norwegian who owns a factory, but he admits nothing. Maigret orders Louis and Martineau to stay in Ouistreham until the investigation is over.

When the Saint-Michel returns to Ouistreham, Maigret questions its captain and Louis in the cabin. He investigates a noise on the deck but is overpowered, bound and gagged. His assailants throw him onto the quay and the Saint-Michel casts off in a violent storm.

The following morning Maigret learns that the Saint Michel has run aground and the crew are missing. He goes to the mayor's home and discovers that Madame Grandmaison is also missing. Maigret and the mayor track her to a small village and find her with Martineau. Maigret arrests him.

They return to Ouistreham where the police have arrested Louis. Maigret and the Grandmaisons go to the mayor's other home in Caen. Maigret learns that Mayor Ernest Grandmaison has a cousin named Raymond who once worked in the shipping company. Raymond embezzled money and Ernest forced him to leave France. Maigret hears a thud upstairs and investigates – Ernest has fatally shot himself.

Madame Grandmaison reveals she had been in love with Raymond, but after he left France, she married Ernest. Her son is Raymond's. Yesterday Ernest told her to pick up the boy from the boarding school in Paris. She did not know Raymond was in France until he asked her to meet him near the village.

Martineau, formerly Raymond Grandmaison, confesses that six weeks earlier he returned to France in secret to kidnap his son. Joris and Louis were his accomplices. Ernest shot Joris during the kidnap attempt. The conspirators took Joris to Holland where surgeons operated on him, but he remained disabled and mute. Raymond eventually took him to Paris and sent him 300,000 francs.

Ernest poisoned Joris because he was afraid Joris would recover and reveal he had shot him. Raymond returned on the Saint Michel and sent Louis to force Ernest to write a letter to the boarding school releasing his son into Raymond's care. But Maigret was getting too close, so the conspirators tried to sail off.

Maigret lets Louis and Raymond go, suggesting they claim that a foreign sailor killed Joris over an old grudge. He recommends they sail away far from Ouistreham.

== Publication history ==
The novel was first published in French in 1932 by Fayard in Paris. It was first published in English in 1941 as Death of a Habour Master in a translation by Stuart Gilbert. This translation was subsequently republished under the titles Maigret and the Death of a Habour Master and The Port of Shadows. A new English translation by Linda Coverdale was published by Penguin Books in 2015 as The Misty Harbour.

== Adaptations ==
The novel has been adapted three times for television: in English, in 1961 as The Lost Sailor, with Rupert Davies as Maigret; in French, in 1996 as Maigret et le port des brumes, with Bruno Cremer in the main role, and in 1972 as Le Port des brumes with Jean Richard in the lead role.
