= Daniel Mendelsohn =

American writer (born 1960)

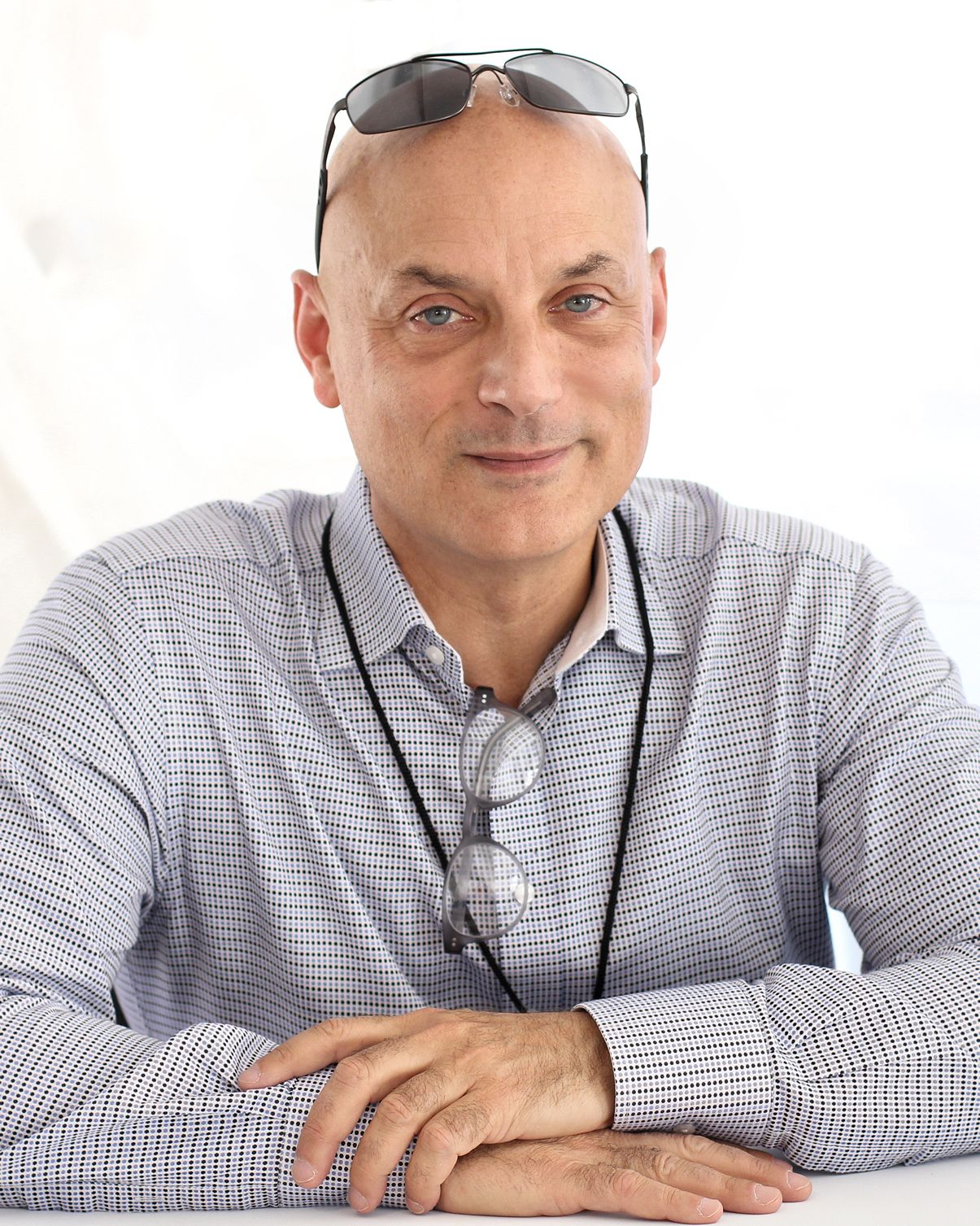
- Mendelsohn in 2018
- Born: Daniel Adam Mendelsohn; 1960 (age 65–66); Long Island, New York, U.S.
- Education: University of Virginia (BA); Princeton University (MA, PhD)
- Occupations: Author, essayist, critic, columnist, translator
- Writing career
- Language: English, Greek, French, Italian, German
- Genres: Criticism, non-fiction, memoir
- Subjects: Holocaust, Judaism, classics, Cavafy, literature, film, theater, television
- Notable works: The Lost (2006); An Odyssey (2017)
- Website: danielmendelsohn.com

Daniel Adam Mendelsohn (born 1960) is an American author, essayist, critic, columnist and translator. He is currently the Charles Ranlett Flint Professor of Humanities at Bard College, the Editor at Large of the New York Review of Books, and the Director of the Robert B. Silvers Foundation, a charitable organization dedicated to supporting writers of nonfiction.

== Early life and education ==
Mendelsohn was born to a Jewish family in New York City. He was raised on Long Island in the town of Old Bethpage, New York. He attended the University of Virginia, graduating with a B.A. in classics in 1982 with highest honors.

From 1982 to 1985, he resided in New York City, working as an assistant to an opera impresario, Joseph A. Scuro. The following year he began graduate studies at Princeton University, receiving his M.A. in 1989 and his Ph.D. in 1994. His dissertation, later published as a scholarly monograph by Oxford University Press, was on Euripidean tragedy.

Mendelsohn is one of five siblings. His brothers include film director Eric Mendelsohn and Matt Mendelsohn, a photographer; his sister, Jennifer Mendelsohn, also a journalist, is the founder of "#ResistanceGenealogy". He is the nephew of the psychologist Allan Rechtschaffen. In an interview, Mendelsohn claimed that his reading of Proust and recognizing the inevitability of an unfulfilled romantic life as a gay man encouraged him to become a writer.

== Career ==
While still a graduate student, Mendelsohn began contributing reviews, op-eds, and essays to such publications as QW, Out, The New York Times, The Nation and The Village Voice. After completing his Ph.D., he moved to New York City and began writing full-time.

Since then his review-essays on books, films, theater and television have appeared frequently in numerous major publications, most often in The New Yorker and The New York Review of Books. Others include Town & Country, The New York Times Magazine, Travel + Leisure, Newsweek, Esquire, The Paris Review, The New Republic and Harper's magazine, where Mendelsohn was a culture columnist.

Between 2000 and 2002 he was the weekly book critic for New York Magazine. His reviews have also appeared frequently in The New York Times Book Review, where he was also a columnist for the "Bookends" page.

Mendelsohn is the author of ten books, including New York Times bestseller and international bestseller The Lost: A Search for Six of Six Million and An Odyssey: A Father, a Son, and an Epic (2017), a Kirkus Best Memoir of the Year and winner of France's Prix Méditerrannée.

His book, Three Rings: A Tale of Exile, Narrative, and Fate, published in 2020, was a Kirkus Best Book of 2020 and won the Prix du Meilleur Livre Étranger (Best Foreign Book Prize) in France. In 2022 he was awarded the Premio Malaparte, Italy's highest honor for foreign writers, and was named a Chevalier de Ordre des Arts et des Lettres by the Government of France.

On April 9, 2025, his new translation of Homer's Odyssey was published by the University of Chicago Press.

== The New York Review of Books ==
Mendelsohn began contributing to the New York Review of Books early in 2000, and soon became a frequent contributor, publishing articles on a wide range of subjects including Greek drama and poetry, American and British theater, literature, television and film. Over time he became a close personal friend of the founding editor Robert B. Silvers and Silvers' partner, Grace, Countess of Dudley.

During a period of editorial reorganization in the year and a half following Silvers' death, Mendelsohn was named the first Editor-at-Large of the Review, a position created for him by the publisher, Rea Hederman, to go alongside the editorship, which was then split between co-editors Emily Greenhouse and Gabriel Winslow-Yost.

In February, 2019, Hederman also announced that Mendelsohn had been named Director of the Robert B. Silvers Foundation, as per a stipulation in Silvers' will. The Foundation is dedicated to supporting writers of nonfiction of the kind Silvers fostered at the Review: long-form criticism and journalism and writing on arts and culture.

== Academic career and positions ==
Mendelsohn's academic speciality was Greek (especially Euripidean) tragedy; he has also published scholarly articles about Roman poetry and Greek religion. During the 1990s, he taught intermittently as a lecturer in the Classics department at Princeton University. In the fall of 2006, he was named to the Charles Ranlett Flint Chair in Humanities at Bard College, where he currently teaches one course each semester on literary subjects. His academic residencies have included the Richard Holbrooke Distinguished Visitor at the American Academy in Berlin, Germany (2008); Critic-in-Residence at the American Academy in Rome (2010), and Visiting writer at the Ca' Foscari University of Venice (2014). In March 2019, he was in residence at the University of Virginia, where he gave the Page-Barbour Lectures.

== Major works ==
- On 9 April 2025 Mendelsohn's new translation of Homer's Odyssey was published by the University of Chicago Press.
- An Odyssey: A Father, a Son, and an Epic (2017), a memoir intertwining a personal narrative about the author's late father, Jay, a retired research scientist who decided to enroll in his son's spring 2011 Odyssey seminar at Bard College, with reflections on the text of Homer's Odyssey and its theme of father-son relationships, education, and identity. The book, the third in which the author combines memoir and literary criticism, was published by Knopf in September 2017 to acclaim in the U.S., where it was named a Best Book of the Year by National Public Radio, Library Journal, Newsday, Kirkus Reviews, and The Christian Science Monitor, the U.K., where it was shortlisted for the Baillie Gifford Prize, and France, where it won the 2018 Prix Méditerranée.
- C. P. Cavafy: Collected Poems and C. P. Cavafy: The Unfinished Poems, published simultaneously in March 2009. Mendelsohn's translation of the complete poetry of the Alexandrian Greek poet Constantine Cavafy was a Publishers Weekly Best Book of 2009 and was shortlisted for the Criticos Prize (now the London Hellenic Prize). The two-volume hardcover edition was published as a single-volume paperback by Vintage Books in May 2012; a selection was published in the Everyman's Library Pocket Poets series in 2014.
- The Lost: A Search for Six of Six Million (2006), the story of the author's worldwide search over five years to learn about the fates of relatives who perished in the Holocaust, was published to wide acclaim in the US and throughout Europe. After the book's publication in a bestselling French translation, in 2007, film rights were optioned by director Jean-Luc Godard.
- Gender and the City in Euripides' Political Plays, published by Oxford University Press in 2002, was the first scholarly study in fifty years of two lesser-known plays of Euripides, Children of Heracles and Suppliant Women. A paperback edition was published in 2005.
- The Elusive Embrace: Desire and the Riddle of Identity (Alfred A. Knopf, 1999), a memoir entwining themes of gay identity, family history, and Classical myth and literature, was named a New York Times Notable Book of the Year, and a Los Angeles Times Best Book of the Year.

== Awards and honors ==
Mendelsohn has been the recipient of numerous prizes and honors both in the United States and abroad. Apart from awards for individual books, these include the American Academy of Arts and Letters Harold D. Vursell Memorial Prize for Prose Style (2014); the American Philological Association President's Award for service to the Classics (2014); the George Jean Nathan Prize for Drama Criticism (2002); and the National Book Critics Circle Award Citation for Excellence in Book Reviewing (2000)

- 2025 Elected to the American Academy of Arts and Letters
- 2023 Honorary doctorate from Aix-Marseille University (France)
- 2022 Premio Malaparte (Italy)
- 2022 Chevalier de l'ordre des Arts et des Lettres of the French Ministry of Culture
- 2020 Prix du Meilleur Livre Étranger (Best Foreign Book Prize) for Trois Anneaux: Un conte d'exils (French translation of Three Rings)
- 2018 Prix Méditerranée Étranger for Une odyssée (French translation of An Odyssey: A Father, a Son, and an Epic)
- 2018 London Hellenic Prize (UK), shortlisted for An Odyssey: A Father, a Son, and an Epic
- 2018 Princeton University James Madison Medal
- 2017 Prix Transfuge for Une odyssée (French translation of An Odyssey: A Father, a Son, and an Epic)
- 2017 Baillie Gifford Prize, shortlisted for An Odyssey: A Father, a Son, and an Epic
- 2014 American Academy of Arts and Letters Harold D. Vursell Memorial Prize for Prose Style
- 2013 PEN/Diamonstein-Spielvogel Award for the Art of the Essay, runner-up for Waiting for the Barbarians
- 2012 Elected to the American Academy of Arts and Sciences
- 2012 National Book Critics Circle Award, finalist for Waiting for the Barbarians
- 2009 Criticos Prize (UK), shortlisted for C. P. Cavafy: Collected Poems
- 2007 Prix Médicis (France) for Les Disparus (French translation of The Lost: A Search for Six of Six Million)
- 2007 Premio ADEI-WIZO (Italy) for Gli Scomparsi (Italian translation of The Lost: A Search for Six of Six Million)
- 2007 Duff Cooper Prize shortlisted for The Lost: A Search for Six of Six Million
- 2006 Elected to the American Philosophical Society
- 2006 National Book Critics Circle Award winner, Memoir/Autobiography, for The Lost: A Search for Six of Six Million
- 2006 National Jewish Book Award for The Lost: A Search for Six of Six Million
- 2006 Salon Book Award for The Lost: A Search for Six of Six Million
- 2006 Barnes & Noble "Discover" Prize, 2nd place, for The Lost: A Search for Six of Six Million
- 2006 American Library Association Sophie Brody Medal for Outstanding Achievement in Jewish Literature, for The Lost: A Search for Six of Six Million
- 2005 John Simon Guggenheim Fellowship for a translation of Constantine Cavafy's "Unfinished" poems, with commentary.
- 2002 George Jean Nathan Prize for Drama Criticism
- 2000 National Book Critics Circle Award Nona Balakian Citation for Excellence in Book Reviewing

== Bibliography ==
=== Books ===
- Mendelsohn, Daniel (1999). The elusive embrace : desire and the riddle of identity. New York: Alfred A. Knopf.
- — (2002). Gender and the city in Euripides' political plays. Oxford University Press.
- — (2006). The lost : a search for six of six million. HarperCollins.
- — (2008). How beautiful it is and how easily it can be broken. HarperCollins.
- Cavafy, C. P. (2009). Collected poems. Translated by Daniel Mendelsohn.
- — (2009). The unfinished poems. Translated by Daniel Mendelsohn. New York: Knopf.
- — (2012). Complete poems. Translated by Daniel Mendelsohn. New York: Knopf.
- Mendelsohn, Daniel (2012). Waiting for the Barbarians : essays from the Classics to pop culture. New York: New York Review Books.
- An Odyssey: A Father, a Son, and an Epic, Knopf, 2017.
- The Bad Boy of Athens: Musing on Culture from Sappho to Spider-Man, William Collins, July 2019
- Ecstasy and Terror: From the Greeks to Game of Thrones, New York Review Books, October 2019
- Three Rings: A Tale of Exile, Narrative, and Fate, University of Virginia Press, September 2020
- Homer: The Odyssey. Translated, with Introduction and Notes, by Daniel Mendelsohn. University of Chicago Press, April 9, 2025.

=== Essays, reviews and reporting ===
- Mendelsohn, Daniel (July 31, 2000). "Saints preserve us". New York Magazine.
- — (April 5, 2010). "Epic endeavors : three novel takes on Greek myth". The Critics. Books. The New Yorker. Vol. 86, no. 8. pp. 74–79.
- — (November 7, 2011). "Battle lines : a slimmer, faster Iliad". The Critics. Books. The New Yorker. Vol. 87, no. 35. pp. 76–81.
- — (April 16, 2012). "Unsinkable : why we can't let go of the Titanic". Popular Chronicles. The New Yorker. Vol. 88, no. 9. pp. 64–72.
- — (January 7, 2013). "The American boy : a famous author, a young reader, and a life-changing correspondence". Personal History. The New Yorker. Vol. 88, no. 42. pp. 48–61.
- — (April 14, 2014). "Deep frieze : what does the Parthenon mean?". The Ancient World. The New Yorker. Vol. 90, no. 8. pp. 34–39.
- — (March 16, 2015). "Girl, interrupted : who was Sappho?". The Critics. A Critic at Large. The New Yorker. Vol. 91, no. 4. pp. 70–77.
- — (July 27, 2015). "The right poem". The Talk of the Town. Block that Metaphor!. The New Yorker. Vol. 91, no. 21. pp. 18–19.
- — (April 24, 2017). "An odyssey : a father and son go in search of an epic". Personal History. The New Yorker. Vol. 93, no. 10. pp. 54–65.

See also lists of Mendelsohn's articles at New York Magazine, New York Review of Books, The New Yorker, The New York Times Book Review, The Paris Review, Town & Country Magazine, Harper's, Travel + Leisure.

== Bibliography ==
Sophie Vallas (ed.), Daniel Mendelsohn’s Memoir-Writing: Rings of Memory, Lexington Books, 2021.
