= The Lost: A Search for Six of Six Million =

Book by Daniel Mendelsohn

- Author: Daniel Mendelsohn
- Publication date: September 2006
- Awards: National Book Critics Circle Award; National Jewish Book Award; Prix Médicis
- ISBN: 978-0-06-054297-9

The Lost: A Search for Six of Six Million is a non-fiction memoir by Daniel Mendelsohn, published in September 2006, which has received critical acclaim as a new perspective on Holocaust remembrance. It was awarded the National Book Critics Circle Award, the National Jewish Book Award, and the Prix Médicis in France. It was shortlisted for the Duff Cooper History Prize in the UK and placed second for the 2006 Barnes & Noble Discover Great New Writers Award for Nonfiction. An international bestseller, The Lost has been translated into numerous languages, including French, German, Dutch, Italian, Spanish, Portuguese, Greek, Romanian, Turkish, Norwegian, and Hebrew.

The Lost tells of Mendelsohn's world-wide travels in search of details about the lives and fates of a maternal great-uncle, Samuel (Shmiel) Jäger, his wife, Ester, and their four daughters who lived in Bolechow and were killed during the Nazi occupation. According to the author, the book "is about trying to find out exactly, specifically, what happened to those people."

In writing The Lost, Mendelsohn notes a debt to Marcel Proust, telling Salon.com, "Clearly, the book is in some large sense about the possibility of recovering the past, so it's automatically a Proustian book."
