= Jean-Marie Laclavetine =

French editor, writer and translator

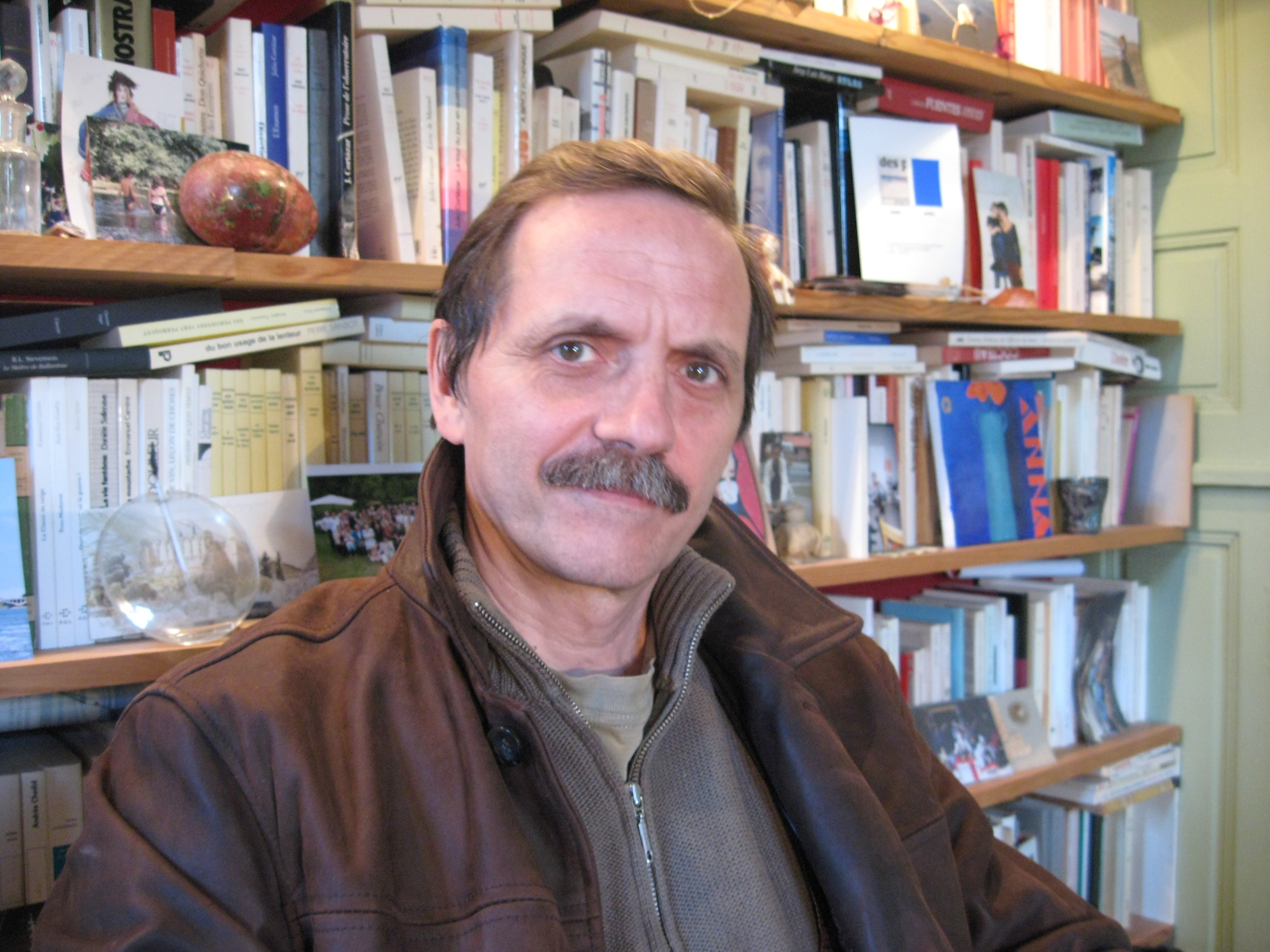
- French editor, writer and translator of Italian literature into French
- Born: Bordeaux
- Writing career
- Period: Contemporary
- Notable work: Les emmurés

Jean-Marie Laclavetine is a French editor, writer and translator of Italian literature into French.

== Biography ==
Jean-Marie Laclavetine was born in Bordeaux.

At the age of 26 he published his first novel, Les Emmurés, for which he received the literary award Prix Fénéon in 1981.

In 1989 he became a member of the Éditions Gallimard publishing house Comité de Lecture. He translated the Italian authors Alberto Savinio, Giuseppe Antonio Borgese, Leonardo Sciascia, Vitaliano Brancati, and Alberto Moravia into French.

== Works ==
- Les emmurés, Gallimard, 1981 (Prix Fénéon)
- La Maison des absences, Gallimard, 1984
- Donnafugata, Gallimard, 1987 (Prix Valery Larbaud)
- Conciliabule avec la reine, Gallimard, 1989
- En douceur, Gallimard, 1991 (Prix François Mauriac)
- Rabelais, essay, Éditions Christian Pirot, 1992 and 2000
- Gens d'à côté, Éditions Christian Pirot, 1992 (Award for the Best Book of Région Centre)
- Richard Texier, mon cousin de Lascaux, Éditions du Cygne, 1993
- Le Rouge et le Blanc, Gallimard, 1994
- Demain la veille, Gallimard, 1997
- Port-Paradis with Philippe Chauvet, Gallimard, 1997
- Richard Texier - Les Dieux de la nuit, Le Temps qu'il fait, 1998
- Écriverons et liserons, dialogue en vingt lettres with Jean Lahougue, Champ Vallon, 1998
- Première ligne, Gallimard, 1999 (Prix Goncourt des lycéens)
- Brenne secrète, Maison du Parc régional de la Brenne, 2000
- Le pouvoir des fleurs, Gallimard, 2002
- La Loire, Mille kilomètres de bonheur, National Geographic, 2002
- Trains de vie, Gallimard, 2003
- Matins bleus, Gallimard, 2004
- Petite éloge du présent, Folio, 2007
- Nous voilà, Gallimard, 2009 (Prix du Roman historique des Rendez-vous de l'histoire de Blois)
- La martre et le léopard: carnets d'un voyage en Croatie, Gallimard, 2010
