= Jean Lahougue =

French writer (b. 1945)

Jean Lahougue (born 27 November 1945 in Paris) is a French writer. He has been teaching in Mayenne since 1979. In 1980, he declined the Prix Médicis for his book Comptine des Height.

== Work ==
- Argos et Athanor, Éditions Gallimard, 1973
- La Visite du château et autres romans, Gallimard, 1975
- La Polonaise, Gallimard, 1976
- Non-lieu dans un paysage, Gallimard, 1977. Vacated Landscape, trans. K. E. Gormley (Wakefield Press, 2024).
- Comptine des Height, NRF, Gallimard, 1980. He took over the master plan of the Ten Little Niggers by Agatha Christie.
- La doublure de Magrite Les Impressions Nouvelles, series Traverses, 1987. Novel built on a system of generative constraints, one of which led him to pastiche the series of Maigret. Georges Simenon having categorically opposed the publication of the book, Lahougue had to rename his protagonist and partially modify his work.
- La ressemblance et autres abus de langage, Les Impressions nouvelles, 1989
- Écriverons et liserons en vingt lettres, éditions Champ Vallon, 1998 (in Jean-Marie Laclavetine's series). In homage to Raymond Queneau, Jean Marie Laclavetine, a reader at Gallimard and Jean Lahougue, oulipian named their letter exchange Écriverons et liserons, implying a new form : "C'est en lisant qu'on devient liseron".
- Le Domaine d'Ana, éditions Champ Vallon, 1998. Cryptogram novel inspired by Jules Verne, with multiple constraints and cryptograms inspired by the Oulipo.
- La ressemblance suivi de La feintise by Jeff Edmunds, Les Impressions Nouvelles, collection Traverses. 2003
- Lettre au maire de mon village, Édition Champ Vallon, series "L'esprit libre", 2004. The author describes how his Mayenne village of Montourtier has gradually lost its identity due to the uncontrolled construction of concrete housing estates, which are more symbolic of the image of a chain of builders than of regional materials. He denounces an urbanization under the sign of laissez-faire and which leads to doing from somewhere, anywhere.
