= Daniel Desmarquest =

French writer

Daniel Desmarquest is a French writer. He is best known for winning the Prix Medicis in 2002 for his book Kafka et les jeunes filles.

Other works include SAD, Aqua bella, Lila Paradis and Les falaises d'Etretat.
