= Václav Jamek =

Czech writer and translator (born 1949)

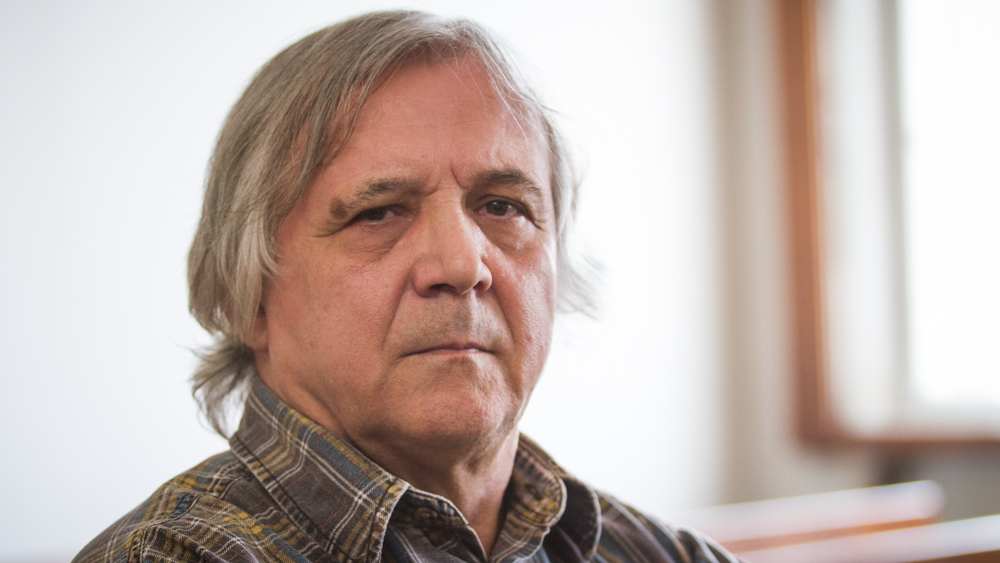
- Václav Jamek
- Born: 27 November 1949 (age 76); Kladno, Czech
- Occupation: Writer

Václav Jamek (27 November 1949, Kladno, Czech) is a Czech writer and translator. He has translated the numerous works from the modern French canon, among them books by Victor Segalen, Georges Perec, Michel Tournier, Patrick Modiano, Emmanuel Bove, Henri Michaux and others.

He is also an award-winning writer, noted for both his poetry and prose. He won the Prix Medicis for his 1989 book Traité des courtes merveilles.

He lives in Prague.
