= Ivan Jablonka =

French historian (born 1973)

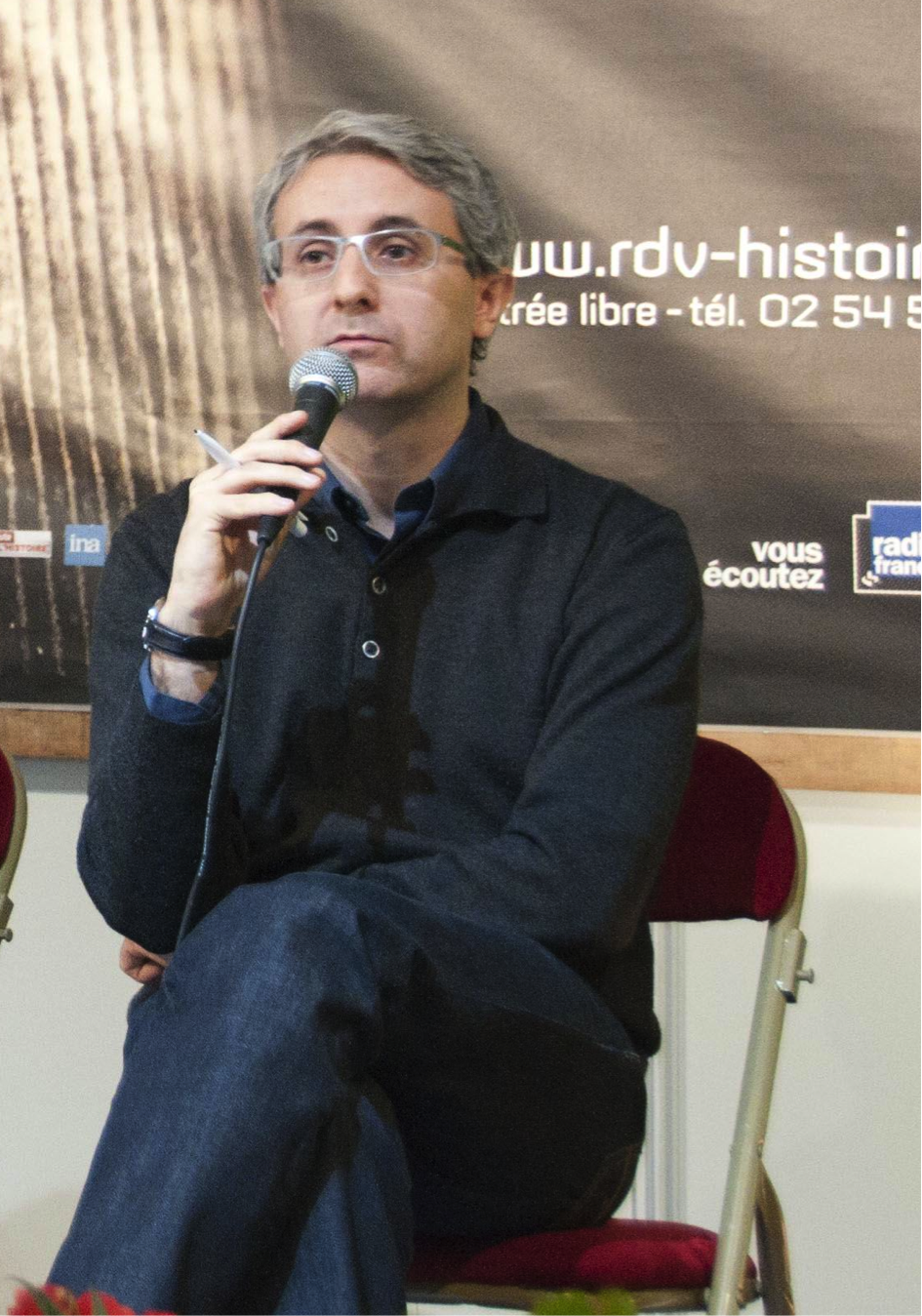
- Ivan Jablonka in 2012
- Born: 23 October 1973 (age 52); Paris, France
- Education: École Normale Supérieure
- Occupation: Historian

Ivan Jablonka (born October 23, 1973) is a French historian and writer.

== Scholarship ==
Born in 1973 in Paris, an alumnus of the École normale supérieure, he is professor of Contemporary History at the Sorbonne Paris North University, editorial director of the collection "La République des idées" (Éditions du Seuil), and one of the editors of the online magazine La Vie des Idées.

His scholarship encompasses abandoned children, the welfare state, gender violence, masculinity, and new forms of historical writing. He documented the fate of his grandparents, Jewish refugees from Poland in occupied France, eventually murdered in Auschwitz in 1943, in A History of the Grandparents I Never Had (Stanford UP, 2016).

He received the Prix Médicis in 2016 for Laëtitia ou la fin des hommes, « an openly feminist book » that tells the story of a young girl murdered at the age of 18,

His book History Is a Contemporary Literature (Cornell UP, 2018) offers perspectives on the writing of History, and the relationship between Literature and the social sciences. Jablonka argues that History, along with Sociology and Anthropology, can "achieve greater rigor and wider audiences by creating a literary text, written and experienced through a broad spectrum of narrative modes and rhetorical figures". Conversely, a whole range of literary texts —travel logs, memoirs, autobiographies, testimonies, diaries, life stories, and news reports— can implement methods and lines of reasoning inspired by the social sciences.

His book A History of Masculinity: From Patriarchy to Gender Justice (Allen Lane, 2022) reimagines the cultures and norms that shape ideas of the “male self”. Arguing that “men are trapped in a gender prison”, he offers a reflection on ancient and modern masculinities, gender justice, and a guide to being a ‘just man’ (un homme juste in French).

== Reception ==
He has given lectures all over the world, notably at the University of Geneva and the University of Lausanne in Switzerland, at the Free University of Berlin in Germany, at the National University of General San Martín in Argentina, at Nanzan University in Japan, and in the US: at Yale University, Boston University, UC Berkeley, Stanford University, and Texas A&M.

He was a visiting professor at New York University in 2020.

His books have been translated into fifteen languages.

== Awards ==
- In 2012, for Histoire des grands-parents que je n'ai pas eus (A History of the Grandparents I Never Had):
  - Senate Prize for History Books,
  - Guizot Prize from the Académie française
  - Augustin-Thierry Prize at the Rendez-vous de l'Histoire.
- In 2016, for Laëtitia ou la fin des hommes (Laëtitia or the End of Men):
  - Literary Prize from Le Monde.
  - Prix Médicis of the French Novel.
- In 2018, for En camping-car (Van Life) :
  - France Télévisions Prize for the Best Essay.

== Works in French ==
- Jablonka, Ivan (2004). Les Vérités inavouables de Jean Genet. Paris: Seuil. ISBN 9782020679404. OCLC 56682134.
- Jablonka, Ivan (2006). Ni père ni mère. Histoire des enfants de l'Assistance publique, 1874-1939. Paris: Seuil. ISBN 9782020839310. OCLC 469857881.
- Jablonka, Ivan (2007). Enfants en exil : transfert de pupilles réunionnais en métropole, 1963-1982. Paris: Seuil. ISBN 9782020932295. OCLC 470860322.
- Bantigny, Ludivine; Jablonka, Ivan, eds. (2009). Jeunesse oblige : histoire des jeunes en France, XIXe-XXIe siècle. Paris: Presses Universitaires de France. ISBN 9782130566922. OCLC 298926343.
- Jablonka, Ivan (2010). Les Enfants de la République : l'intégration des jeunes de 1789 à nos jours. Paris: Seuil. ISBN 9782020908177. OCLC 652449834.
- Jablonka, Ivan (2013). Nouvelles perspectives sur la Shoah. Paris: Presses Universitaires de France. ISBN 9782130619277. OCLC 835412430.
- Jablonka, Ivan (2014). L'Enfant-Shoah. Paris: Presses Universitaires de France. ISBN 9782130592280.
- Jablonka, Ivan (2015). Le Corps des autres. Paris: Seuil. ISBN 9782370210340. OCLC 909307833.
- Jablonka, Ivan (2016). Laëtitia ou La fin des hommes. Paris: Seuil. ISBN 9782021291209. OCLC 958420993.
- Jablonka, Ivan (2018). En camping-car. Paris: Seuil. ISBN 9782757875452.
- Jablonka, Ivan (2021). Un garçon comme vous et moi. Paris: Seuil. ISBN 9782021470079.

== Works in English ==
- Jablonka, Ivan (2016). A History of the Grandparents I Never Had. Stanford: Stanford UP. ASIN B01DZVDXPE.
- Jablonka, Ivan (2018). History Is a Contemporary Literature. Manifesto for the Social Sciences. Ithaca, NY: Cornell UP. ASIN B076VTYP3H.
- Jablonka, Ivan (2022). A History of Masculinity: From Patriarchy to Gender Justice. London: Penguin/Allen Lane. ISBN 978-0241458792.
- Jablonka, Ivan (2008), « Fictive Kinship: Wards and Foster Parents in Nineteenth-Century France », in Susan Broomhall (ed.), Emotions in the Household, 1200-1900, New York: Palgrave Macmillan, 2008, p. 269 - 284.
- Jablonka, Ivan (2011), « Children and the State », in Ed Berenson, Vincent Duclert, Cristophe Prochasson (eds.), The French Republic, Ithaca: Cornell University Press, 2011, p. 315 – 323.
- Jablonka, Ivan (2013), « Social Welfare in the Western World and the Rights of Children (19th–21st centuries) », in Paula Fass (ed.), The Routledge History of Childhood in the Western World, New York: Routledge, 2013, p. 380 – 399.
- Jablonka, Ivan (2016), « History and Comics, » Books and Ideas, 30 May 2016.
- Jablonka, Ivan (2018), "The Future of the Human Sciences," French Politics, Culture, and Society, Vol. 36, No. 3, December 2018, p. 109 – 117.
