= Jacqueline Harpman =

Belgian writer (1929–2012)

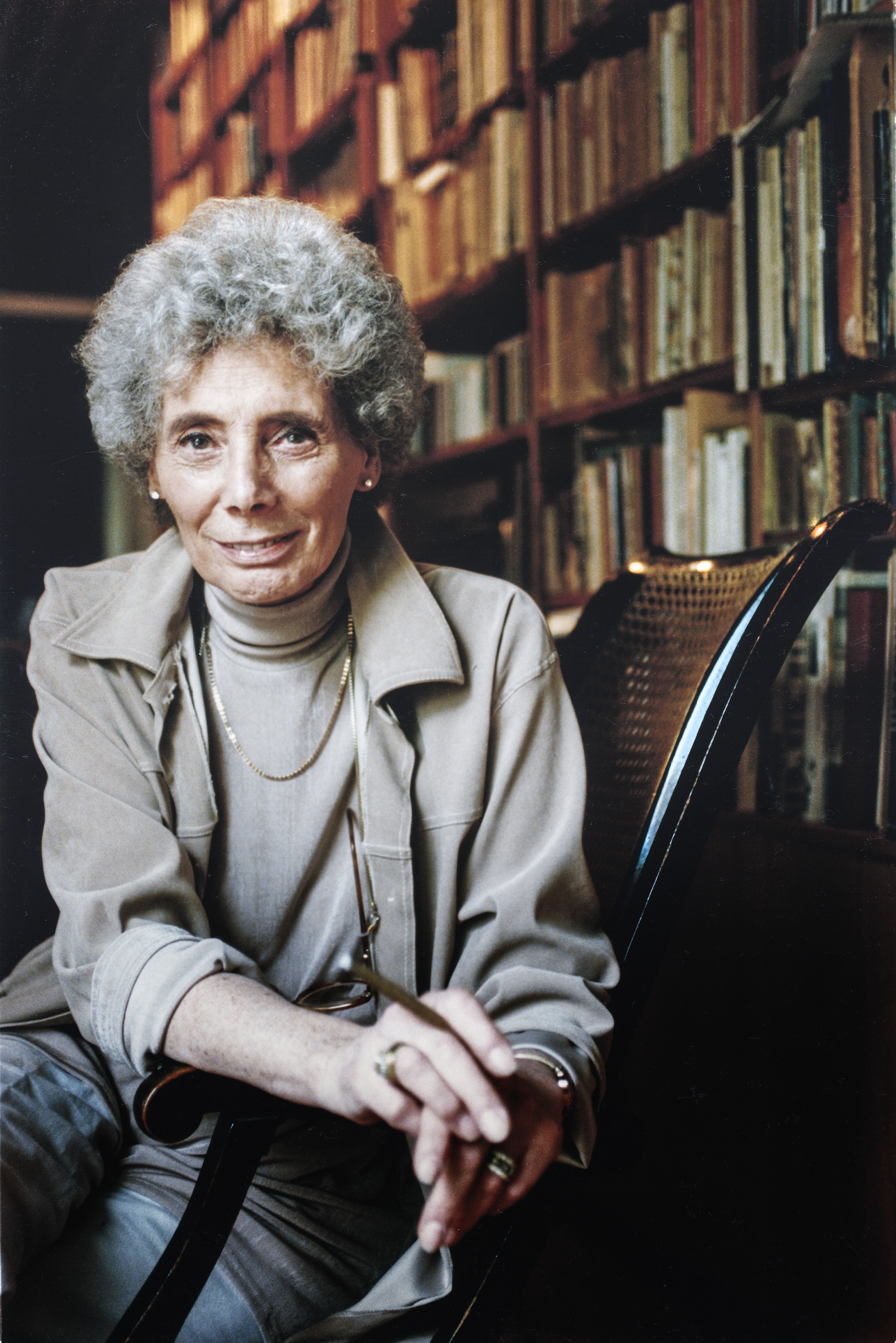
- Harpman, c. 1995
- Born: 5 July 1929; Etterbeek, Brussels, Belgium
- Died: 24 May 2012 (aged 82); Uccle, Belgium
- Occupations: Writer, Psychoanalyst
- Notable work: Brève Arcadie (1959); La plage d'Ostende (1991); Moi qui n'ai pas connu les hommes (1995); Orlanda (1996); La Dormition des amants (2002)
- Spouses: Émile Degelin (1953–1962); Pierre Puttemans (1963-2012)
- Awards: Prix Victor-Rossel (1959); Prix Point de mire (1992); Prix Médicis (1996); Prix triennal du roman de la Communauté française de Belgique (2003)

Jacqueline Harpman (5 July 1929 – 24 May 2012) was a Belgian writer and psychoanalyst.

== Biography ==
Jacqueline Harpman was born on 5 July 1929, in Etterbeek, Belgium, to Jeanne Honorez and Andries Harpman. The couple exported Belgian fabrics and lace to North African colonies and only settled in an apartment after Jacqueline's birth. She was the second daughter born to the couple. Her sister Andrée was nine years her senior. Her father was a Dutch-born Jew, so Harpman's family fled to Casablanca, Morocco when the Nazis invaded during World War II. Jacqueline was forbidden from attending the French High School due to her Jewish origins, so she continued her secondary studies at the Mets Sultan College in Casablanca. There, she met Mademoiselle Barthes, her French teacher, to whom she credits her love for the elegant language of the 18th and 19th centuries. Also while in Casablanca, Jacqueline had to listen to Jacques Doriot's hatred of the Jews. Her feelings during these moments inspired En quarantaine. The Harpmans did not return to Belgium until after the war ended in 1945. A large part of her paternal family was killed at Auschwitz.

Back in Brussels in 1945, Jacqueline finished her secondary studies at the Lycée de Forest. Then, she began studying medicine at the Université libre de Bruxelles (ULB). In 1948, she contracted tuberculosis and was admitted to the university sanatorium of Eupen, where she began writing an unpublished novel, Les Jeux Dangeureux. She was bed-ridden for two years in the sanatorium, before penicillin allowed her to resume her medical studies, which she continued without completing. In 1953, she married Flemish filmmaker Émile Degelin, with whom she collaborated on the writing and directing of several films. They divorced in 1962.

In 1963 she married the architect and poet Pierre Puttemans, and on 19 August she gave birth to her first daughter, Marianne. On 18 May 1965, she gave birth to her second daughter, Toinon.

== Writer, psychoanalyst ==
Harpman published her first text L'amour et l'acacia and her first novel L'apparition des esprits with editor René Julliard. In 1959, she received the Victor-Rossel prize for her novel Brève Arcadie. She wrote for the cinema, made radio broadcasts, and wrote theatre reviews. In 1965, she wrote her third novel Les bons sauvages.

After the death of her editor René Julliard in 1962, she "put down her pen in the middle of writing her fourth novel". Driven by a desire for change, she enrolled at the ULB, where she undertook psychology studies and graduated with a dissertation on the blind prognosis of Rorschach tests. She worked for several years as a psychotherapist at the Fond'Roy clinic, which she left due to anger at the treatment methods the institution practiced at that time. She then began to practice privately and became interested in psychoanalysis. This led her to begin training at the Belgian Psychoanalytic Society (1976). There, she worked with Jean Bégoin, a Parisian Kleinian psychoanalyst. Starting in 1980, she wrote articles for the Belgian Psychoanalytic Review. Some of her best articles were collected by her husband in the publication Écriture et Psychanalyse (Mardaga 2011), including an article on vampires, another on Proust, and many articles on feminism.

While training to become a psychoanalyst, she resumed writing and published the following novels: La Mémoire trouble, (1987), La fille démantelée (1990), and La plage d’Ostende (1991). La plage d’Ostende received the Point de Mire prize in 1992. Then, she published La lucarne, a collection of short stories in which she revisits the myths of Mary, Antigone, and Joan of Arc, and Le Bonheur dans le crime. This novel takes place in an existing Brussels house: the Delune house (Feys castle) located at the intersection of the avenues des Phalènes and Roosevelt. The blueprint of the novel was created in collaboration with her architect husband, Pierre Puttemans. She continued to play with architecture in her work by featuring an architect in En toute impunité, a novel in which three generations of women try to preserve a ruined castle that they have long owned. The architect who bears witness to the story of these women is called Jean Avijl, literary pseudonym of Pierre Puttemans. In 1995, she published Moi qui n'ai pas connu les hommes (I Who Have Never Known Men). This was her first novel translated into English and was originally published under the title The Mistress of Silence. She then published Orlanda in 1996 (Prix Médicis, 2006) and L'orage rompu in 1997. For Le Passage des Éphémères (2004), she asked Pierre Cugnon, an astrophysicist attached to the Royal Observatory of Uccle to guide her in the Observatory to ground her story in reality. He also answered her questions for the novel le temps est un rêve (2004). She did not hide her love of physics and envied the character from le temps est un rêve who is given the chance to live a second life and study physics and astrophysics. She had a large library where theoretical physics books, scientific journals, and science fiction novels were mixed throughout. Several filmmakers were interested in her work, including Gérard Corbiau. He went so far as to propose a fairly complete screenplay for le temps est un rêve, which emphasized the flashback in her story.

== Death and heritage ==
Jacqueline Harpman continued to write and practice psychoanalysis until her death on 24 May 2012 from cancer. She died peacefully at home, surrounded by her husband, her daughters, and her grandchildren.

Harpman's two daughters and four grandchildren all contribute to preserving her legacy. Her daughters have, according to her wishes, deposited her archives at the Archives et Musée de la Littérature in Brussels where the archivists will reconstruct her writing desk.

In 2014 and 2015, Emilie Guillaume, a young actress from Brussels, brought Joan of Arc to life in a show called Jeanne d'Arc au Troisième Degré (Joan of Arc in the Third Degree), which combined Jacqueline Harpman's text with a performance of theatre, circus, and martial arts. Jeannine Pâque, Harpman's biographer, was certain that she would have loved to see her text vibrate in this way.

== Translations ==
Since the 2010s, Harpman's novels have been translated several times. Since 2020 in particular, Moi qui n'ai pas connu les hommes (I Who Have Never Known Men) has enjoyed renewed success, and as of February 2025, there have been 23 translations of this novel. Described as a "Gen Z The Handmaid's Tale", the novel gained significant traction in early 2025 on BookTok, TikTok's book reader community, after being republished in 2022. In 2024, over 100,000 copies were sold in the United States alone.

== Honors and awards ==
- 1959 : prix Victor-Rossel for Brève Arcadie
- 1992 : prix Point de Mire (RTBF) for La Plage d'Ostende
- 1996 : prix Médicis for Orlanda
- 2003 : Prix triennal du roman de la Communauté française de Belgique for La Dormition des amants
- 2006 : grand prix SGDL de littérature for the entirety of the work
- 2018 : a street in Etterbeek was named after her.
- 2019 : an avenue in Uccle was named after her to honor her life's work
- 2020 : a new street, next to the town hall of Etterbeek, was named Jacqueline Harpman
- 2022 : the new municipal library of Molenbeek-Saint-Jean was named after her
- 2024 : on 5 July 2024, the Google Doodle was dedicated to her to celebrate her birthday

== List of works ==
- L'Amour et l'Acacia (coll. Nouvelles, 1958)
- Brève Arcadie (Julliard, 1959) prix Victor-Rossel
- L'Apparition des esprits (Julliard, 1960)
- Les Bons Sauvages (Julliard, 1966 and Labor, coll. Espace Nord, No. 79)
- La Mémoire trouble (Gallimard, 1987)
- La Fille démantelée (Stock, 1990)
- La Plage d'Ostende (Stock, 1991 and Livre de Poche No. 9587)
- La Lucarne (Stock, 1992)
- Le Bonheur dans le crime (Stock, 1993)
- Moi qui n'ai pas connu les hommes (Stock, 1995 and Livre de Poche No. 14093)
  - English translation by Ros Schwartz: as Mistress of Silence (Harvill, 1997) in the UK and as I Who Have Never Known Men (Seven Stories Press, 1997) in the U.S.; the latter title has been retained for all subsequent reissues (Avon Eos, 1998; Vintage, 2019; Transit Books, 2022)
- Orlanda (Grasset, 1996 and Livre de Poche No. 14468) (prix Médicis)
  - English translation by Ros Schwartz: Orlanda (Harvill, 1999 in the UK and Seven Stories Press, 1999 in the U.S.)
- L'Orage rompu (Grasset, 1998)
- Dieu et moi (Mille et une nuits, 1999)
- Récit de la dernière année (Grasset, 2000)
- Le Véritable Amour (Ancrage, 2000)
- La Vieille Dame et moi (Le Grand Miroir, 2001)
- En quarantaine (Mille et une nuits, 2001)
- Ève et autres nouvelles (Espace nord, 2001)
- La Dormition des amants (Grasset, 2002) (prix du roman CF de Belgique)
- Le Placard à balais (Le Grand Miroir, 2003)
- Jusqu'au dernier jour de mes jours (Labor, 2004)
- Le Temps est un rêve (Le Grand Miroir, 2004)
- Le Passage des éphémères (Grasset, 2004)
- La Forêt d'Ardenne (Le Grand Miroir, 2004)
- En toute impunité (Grasset, 2005)
- Du côté d'Ostende (Grasset, 2006)
- Mes Œdipe (Le Grand Miroir, 2006)
- Ce que Dominique n'a pas su (Grasset, 2007)
- Écriture et Psychanalyse (Mardaga, 2011)
