= Oscar Coop-Phane =

French writer (born 1988)

Oscar Coop-Phane (born 1988) is a French writer. Pursuing a bohemian lifestyle since his teens, he has lived in Berlin and Paris. He won the Prix de Flore in 2012 with his acclaimed debut novel Zenith Hotel (translated into English by Ros Schwartz). His second novel Tomorrow Berlin is also available in English, in a translation by George Miller.

In an interview, Coop-Phane acknowledged his debt to forgotten French writers of the 20th century, e.g. Emmanuel Bove, Eugène Dabit, Louis Calaferte, Raymond Guérin, Georges Hyvernaud, Henri Calet, and Charles-Louis Philippe.
