= I Who Have Never Known Men =

1995 novel by Jacqueline Harpman

- First edition
- Author: Jacqueline Harpman
- Original title: Moi qui n'ai pas connu les hommes
- Translator: Ros Schwartz
- Language: French language
- Genre: Science fiction
- Publisher: French version: Stock; English version: Harvill (UK) and Seven Stories Press (U.S.); Transit Books (U.S.)
- Publication date: 1995
- Publication place: Paris
- English publication date: 1997

I Who Have Never Known Men (French: Moi qui n'ai pas connu les hommes) is a 1995 dystopian science fiction novel by Belgian author Jacqueline Harpman.

It was the first of Harpman's novels to be translated into English. The translation, by Ros Schwartz, was originally published in 1997 by Harvill in the UK under the title Mistress of Silence. The U.S. edition was published by Seven Stories Press the same year with the title I Who Have Never Known Men, which has been retained for all subsequent reissues (Avon Eos, 1998; Vintage, 2019; Transit Books, 2022).

== Synopsis ==
The narrator introduces the book by reflecting on the authors of the books that she has read, her humanity, and the death of her close friend Anthea. She states that “as (she) writes these words, (her) story is over,” and begins to speak of her life.

Thirty-nine women and a girl are being held prisoner in a cage underground. The guards are all male, and never speak to them. The girl is the only one of the prisoners who has no memory of the outside world; none of them know why they are being held prisoner, or why there is one child among thirty-nine adults. The narrator notes her dissimilarity to the group, not only in physical maturity but in perceived humanity, as she has never experienced a normal human life as the other women have. This causes her to initially hold animosity towards them. She becomes fixated on a male guard and continually stares at him in an attempt to force him to acknowledge her, as well as creating stories in her mind that lead to an “eruption” (implied to be an orgasm).

One day, an alarm sounds, and the guards flee; as a guard was opening the cage in order to feed the prisoners, they are subsequently able to escape. They find themselves on an immense barren plain, with no other people anywhere, and no clue as to what has happened to the world.

The women form a community, build dwellings, and one by one mourn the deaths of their group. Finally, only the narrator is left living. In her wanderings, she affirms the planet has "almost no seasons", and decides she is no longer on Earth. After many years exploring, she discovers an underground bunker with lushly-appointed furnishings and a variety of inscrutable scientific equipment, some of which she associates with the bunker's books on astronautics. In this luxurious bunker, the narrator sets down her memoirs (the text of the novel), as she prepares to commit suicide after developing uterine cancer.

== Reception ==
The book was a finalist for the 1995 Prix Femina.

The New York Times described the novel as "bleak but fascinating", and "about as heavyhearted as fiction can get". Kirkus Reviews compared it to The Handmaid's Tale, and said that it is "thin", but "moving" and "powerful". L'Express called it "poignant" and "magnificent", and the product of a "profoundly original imagination". In a piece for The New York Review of Books, Deborah Eisenberg wrote, “Paradoxically, the book’s austere mystery—the atrophied and gelid world it depicts—provides a richly allusive consideration of human life.”

Ros Schwartz revised her translation for the 2019 reissue by Vintage in the UK, which included an introduction by Sophie Mackintosh. This revamp was released in the U.S. by Transit in 2022. Available again in English after many years out of print, the novel experienced a surge in popularity, in part due to reviews on TikTok. In 2024, a reissue of the book sold 100,000 copies in the United States.
