= Toine Heijmans =

Dutch writer and journalist

- In a 2023 interview
- Born: 1969 (age 56–57)
- Occupations: Writer; journalist

Toine Heijmans (born 1969) is a Dutch writer and journalist. He made his literary debut with the non-fiction book La Vie Vinex (2007), followed by his first novel Op Zee (At Sea, 2011). This book has been translated into several European languages and won the Prix Médicis étranger in 2013.

Heijmans works for de Volkskrant.
