= Prix Médicis =

Annual French literary award

The Prix Médicis (French pronunciation: [pʁi medisis]) is a French literary award given each year in November. It was founded in 1958 by Gala Barbisan and Jean-Pierre Giradoux. It is awarded to an author whose "fame does not yet match his talent".

The award goes to a work of fiction initially published in the French language. In 1970 the Prix Médicis étranger was added to recognize a book published in translation. The Prix Médicis essai has been awarded since 1985 for non-fiction works.

== Laureates Prix Médicis ==
| Year | Author | Work | Ref |
|---|---|---|---|
| 1958 | Claude Ollier | La Mise en scène | |
| 1959 | Claude Mauriac | Le Dîner en ville | |
| 1960 | Henri Thomas | John Perkins suivi: d'un scrupule | |
| 1961 | Philippe Sollers | Le Parc | |
| 1962 | Colette Audry | Derrière la baignoire | |
| 1963 | Gérard Jarlot | Un chat qui aboie | |
| 1964 | Monique Wittig | L'Opoponax | |
| 1965 | René-Victor Pilhes | La Rhubarbe | |
| 1966 | Marie-Claire Blais | Une saison dans la vie d'Emmanuel | |
| 1967 | Claude Simon | Histoire | |
| 1968 | Elie Wiesel | Le Mendiant de Jérusalem | |
| 1969 | Hélène Cixous | Dedans | |
| 1970 | Camille Bourniquel | Sélinonte ou la Chambre impériale | |
| 1971 | Pascal Lainé | L'Irrévolution | |
| 1972 | Maurice Clavel | Le Tiers des étoiles | |
| 1973 | Tony Duvert | Paysage de fantaisie | |
| 1974 | Dominique Fernandez | Porporino ou les Mystères de Naples | |
| 1975 | Jacques Almira | Le Voyage à Naucratis | |
| 1976 | Marc Cholodenko | Les États du désert | |
| 1977 | Michel Butel | L'Autre Amour | |
| 1978 | Georges Perec | La vie mode d'emploi | |
| 1979 | Claude Durand | La Nuit zoologique | |
| 1980 | Jean Lahougue | Comptine des Height | |
| 1981 | François-Olivier Rousseau | L'Enfant d'Édouard | |
| 1982 | Jean-François Josselin | L'Enfer et Cie | |
| 1983 | Jean Echenoz | Cherokee | |
| 1984 | Bernard-Henri Lévy | Le Diable en tête | |
| 1985 | Michel Braudeau | Naissance d'une passion | |
| 1986 | Pierre Combescot | Les Funérailles de la Sardine | |
| 1987 | Pierre Mertens | Les Éblouissements | |
| 1988 | Christiane Rochefort | La Porte du fond | |
| 1989 | Serge Doubrovsky | Le Livre brisé | |
| 1990 | Jean-Noël Pancrazi | Les Quartiers d'hiver | |
| 1991 | Yves Simon | La Dérive des sentiments | |
| 1992 | Michel Rio | Tlacuilo | |
| 1993 | Emmanuèle Bernheim | Sa femme | |
| 1994 | Yves Berger | Immobile dans le courant du fleuve | |
| 1995 | Vassilis Alexakis | La Langue maternelle | |
| 1995 | Andreï Makine | Dreams of My Russian Summers | |
| 1996 | Jacqueline Harpman | Orlanda | |
| 1996 | Jean Rolin | L'Organisation | |
| 1997 | Philippe Le Guillou | Les Sept Noms du peintre | |
| 1998 | Homéric | Le Loup mongol | |
| 1999 | Christian Oster | Mon grand appartement | |
| 2000 | Yann Apperry | Diabolus in musica | |
| 2001 | Benoît Duteurtre | Le Voyage en France | |
| 2002 | Anne F. Garréta | Pas un jour | |
| 2003 | Hubert Mingarelli | Quatre soldats | |
| 2004 | Marie Nimier | La Reine du silence | |
| 2005 | Jean-Phillippe Toussaint | Fuir | |
| 2006 | Sorj Chalandon | La promesse | |
| 2007 | Jean Hatzfeld | La stratégie des antilopes | |
| 2008 | Jean-Marie Blas de Roblès | Là où les tigres sont chez eux | |
| 2009 | Dany Laferrière | L'énigme du retour | |
| 2010 | Maylis de Kerangal | Naissance d'un pont | |
| 2011 | Mathieu Lindon | Ce qu'aimer veut dire | |
| 2012 | Emmanuelle Pireyre | Féerie générale | |
| 2013 | Marie Darrieussecq | Il faut beaucoup aimer les hommes | |
| 2014 | Antoine Volodine | Terminus radieux | |
| 2015 | Nathalie Azoulai | Titus n'aimait pas Bérénice | |
| 2016 | Ivan Jablonka | Laetitia ou la fin des hommes | |
| 2017 | Yannick Haenel | Tiens ferme ta couronne | |
| 2018 | Pierre Guyotat | Idiotie | |
| 2019 | Luc Lang | La Tentation | |
| 2020 | Chloé Delaume | Le Cœur synthétique | |
| 2021 | Christine Angot | Le Voyage dans l'Est | |
| 2022 | Emmanuelle Bayamack-Tam | La Treizième Heure | |
| 2023 | Kevin Lambert | Que notre joie demeure | |
| 2024 | Julia Deck | Ann d'Angleterre | |
| 2025 | Emmanuel Carrere | Kolkhoze | |
| 2026 | Philippe Vasset | Dans les grandes lignes | |

== Laureates Prix Médicis étranger ==
| Year | Author | Work | Country | Ref |
|---|---|---|---|---|
| 1970 | Luigi Malerba | Saut de la mort | ITA | |
| 1971 | (no award) | | | |
| 1972 | Severo Sarduy | Cobra | CUB | |
| 1973 | Milan Kundera | Life Is Elsewhere | CSK | |
| 1974 | Julio Cortázar | Libro de Manuel | ARG | |
| 1975 | Steven Millhauser | Edwin Mullhouse | USA | |
| 1976 | Doris Lessing | The Golden Notebook | UK | |
| 1977 | Hector Bianciotti | Le Traité des saisons | ARG | |
| 1978 | Alexander Zinoviev | L'Avenir radieux | SUN | |
| 1979 | Alejo Carpentier | La harpe et l'ombre | CUB | |
| 1980 | André Brink | A Dry White Season | ZAF | |
| 1981 | David Shahar | Le Jour de la comtesse | ISR | |
| 1982 | Umberto Eco | The Name of the Rose | ITA | |
| 1983 | Kenneth White | La route bleue | UK | |
| 1984 | Elsa Morante | Aracoeli | ITA | |
| 1985 | Joseph Heller | God Knows | USA | |
| 1986 | John Hawkes | Adventures in the Alaskan Skin Trade | USA | |
| 1987 | Antonio Tabucchi | Indian Nocturne (French title: Nocturne indien) | ITA | |
| 1988 | Thomas Bernhard | Les Maîtres anciens | AUT | |
| 1989 | Álvaro Mutis | La Neige de l'amiral | COL | |
| 1990 | Amitav Ghosh | The Circle of Reason (French Title: Les feux du Bengale) | IND | |
| 1991 | (no award) | | | |
| 1992 | Louis Begley | Wartime Lies (French title: Une education polonaise) | USA | |
| 1993 | Paul Auster | Leviathan | USA | |
| 1994 | Robert Schneider | Frère Sommeil | AUT | |
| 1995 | Alessandro Baricco | Châteaux de la colère | ITA | |
| 1996 | Lyudmila Ulitskaya | Sonietchka | RUS | |
| 1996 | Michael Krüger | Himmelfarb | GER | |
| 1997 | T. C. Boyle | The Tortilla Curtain (French title: America) | USA | |
| 1998 | Jonathan Coe | The House of Sleep | UK | |
| 1999 | Björn Larsson | Le capitaine et les rêves | SWE | |
| 2000 | Michael Ondaatje | Anil's Ghost | CAN | |
| 2001 | Antonio Skármeta | La noce du poète | CHL | |
| 2002 | Philip Roth | The Human Stain | USA | |
| 2003 | Enrique Vila-Matas | Le Mal de Montano | ESP | |
| 2004 | Aharon Appelfeld | Histoire d'une vie | ISR | |
| 2005 | Orhan Pamuk | Snow (French title: Neige) | TUR | |
| 2006 | Norman Manea | Return of the Hooligan | ROM | |
| 2007 | Daniel Mendelsohn | The Lost: A Search for Six of Six Million (French title: Les disparus) | USA | |
| 2008 | Alain Claude Sulzer | Un garçon parfait | CHE | |
| 2009 | Dave Eggers | What Is the What (French title: Le Grand Quoi) | USA | |
| 2010 | David Vann | Sukkwan Island | USA | |
| 2011 | David Grossman | To the End of the Land (French title: Une femme fuyant l'annonce) | ISR | |
| 2012 | A. B. Yehoshua | Spanish Charity (French title: Rétrospective) | ISR | |
| 2013 | Toine Heijmans | Op zee (French title: En mer) | NLD | |
| 2014 | Lily Brett | Lola Bensky | AUS | |
| 2015 | Hakan Günday | Encore | TUR | |
| 2016 | Steve Sem-Sandberg | Les élus | SWE | |
| 2017 | Paolo Cognetti | Les huit montagnes | ITA | |
| 2018 | Rachel Kushner | The Mars Room (French title: Le Mars Club) | USA | |
| 2019 | Auður Ava Ólafsdóttir | Miss Islande | ISL | |
| 2020 | Antonio Muñoz Molina | Un andar solitario entre la gente (French title: Un promeneur solitaire dans la foule) | ESP | |
| 2021 | Jonas Hassen Khemiri | La Clause paternelle | SWE | |
| 2022 | Andrey Kurkov | Grey Bees (French title: Les abeilles grises) | UKR | |
| 2023 | Han Kang | We Do Not Part (French title: Impossibles adieux) | KOR | |
| 2023 | Lídia Jorge | Misericordia | POR | |
| 2024 | Eduardo Halfon | Tarentule | GTM | |
| 2025 | Nina Allan | Good Neighbours (French title: Les Bons Voisins ) | | |
| 2026 | Eva Baltasar | Déclin et fascination | | |

== Laureates Prix Médicis essai ==
| Year | Author | Work | Country | Ref |
|---|---|---|---|---|
| 1985 | Michel Serres | Les Cinq Sens | | |
| 1986 | Julian Barnes | Le Perroquet de Flaubert | | |
| 1987 | Georges Borgeaud | Le Soleil sur Aubiac | | |
| 1988 | (no award) | | | |
| 1989 | Václav Jamek | Traité des courtes merveilles | | |
| 1990 | René Girard | Shakespeare: les feux de l'envie (A Theatre of Envy: William Shakespeare) | | |
| 1991 | Alain Etchegoyen | La Valse des éthiques | | |
| 1992 | Luc Ferry | Le Nouvel Ordre écologique | | |
| 1993 | Michel Onfray | La Sculpture de soi | | |
| 1994 | Jérôme Garcin | Pour Jean Prévost | | |
| 1995 | Pascal Bruckner | La tentation de l'innocence | | |
| 1996 | Viviane Forrester | L'Horreur économique | | |
| 1997 | Michel Winock | Siècle des intellectuels | | |
| 1998 | Alberto Manguel | Une histoire de la lecture | CAN | |
| 1999 | Christine Jordis | Gens de la Tamise et d'autres rivages | | |
| 2000 | Armelle Le Bras-Chopard | Le Zoo des philosophes | | |
| 2001 | Edwy Plenel | Secrets de jeunesse | | |
| 2002 | Daniel Desmarquest | Kafka et les jeunes filles | | |
| 2003 | Michel Schneider | Morts imaginaires | | |
| 2004 | Diane de Margerie | Aurore et George | | |
| 2005 | Lydie Violet and Marie Desplechin | La Vie sauve | | |
| 2006 | Jean-Bertrand Pontalis | Frère du précédent | | |
| 2007 | Joan Didion | L'Année de la pensée magique | USA | |
| 2008 | Cécile Guilbert | Warhol Spirit | | |
| 2009 | Alain Ferry | Mémoire d'un fou d'Emma | | |
| 2010 | Michel Pastoureau | Les Couleurs de nos souvenirs | | |
| 2011 | Sylvain Tesson | Dans les forêts de Sibérie | | |
| 2012 | David Van Reybrouck | Congo: The Epic History of a People | | |
| 2013 | Svetlana Alexievich | La Fin de l'homme rouge ou le temps du désenchantement (Время секонд хэнд) | | |
| 2014 | Frédéric Pajak | Manifeste incertain 3 | | |
| 2015 | Nicole Lapierre | Sauve qui peut la vie | | |
| 2016 | Jacques Henric | Boxe | | |
| 2017 | Shulem Deen | Celui qui va vers elle ne revient pas | | |
| 2018 | Stefano Massini | Les Frères Lehman | ITA | |
| 2019 | Bulle Ogier and Anne Diatkine | J'ai oublié | | |
| 2020 | Karl Ove Knausgård | Fin de combat | | |
| 2021 | Jakuta Alikavazovic | Comme un ciel en nous | | |
| 2022 | Georges Didi-Huberman | Le Témoin jusqu'au bout | | |
| 2023 | Laure Murat | Proust, roman familial | | |
| 2024 | Reiner Stach | Kafka (tome 3). Les années de jeunesse | | |
| 2025 | Fabrice Gabriel | Au cinéma Central | | |
| 2026 | Jean-Baptiste Del Amo | Une éclaircie | | |
