= Éditions Apogée =

The Éditions Apogée is a French publishing house created in 1991 in Rennes by André Crenn, and is directed by Antoine Cam.

In literature, fine books, humanities, regionalism and heritage, its catalog presents three hundred and fifty titles, divided into eighteen collections ranging from poetry to men and places in Brittany, through CEDRE (Centre de recherches européennes à Rennes).

The company published authors such as Françoise Ascal, Albert Bensoussan, Bernard Boisson, Alain Jégou, Jacques Josse, Alice Massénat, Erwann Rougé and Claude Herviou.
