= Holy Virility =

1981 book by Emmanuel Reynaud

- Author: Emmanuel Reynaud
- Publication date: 1981
- ISBN: 0861043995

Holy Virility: The Social Construction of Masculinity is a 1981 book by Emmanuel Reynaud.

First published in France in as La Sainte Virilité, Holy Virility explores how language and society place pressure upon men to behave in line with their socially gendered role. Reynaud calls for men to fight for self-realization in order to emancipate themselves. He states that association of power in male sexuality prevents men from enjoying sensual sex.

Daniel Wesler-Lang, in his article Déconstruire le masculin, problèmes épistémologiques, situates Reynauds thoughts within studies of masculinity and violence.

== Background ==
Holy Virility observes the different aspects of male power that is perpetrated on women. The book The Social Construction of Masculinity explains how Holy Virility and males are oppressed to measure up to the standards of being an identified male. The author Emmanuel Renaud argues that "It is within men's grasp to reject power relations and begin to behave in a way that is neither hierarchical nor exploitative." The author explores different dynamics and is active in finding knowledge to educate men and women. The book's main focus is on men's biological makeup, sexuality, phallic orgasm, language, being a dad/rapist and being married. Emmanuel Reynaud explores and explains how men's performance in society are supposed to be masculine. Emmanuel Reynaud born in France influences and educates the men's movement in France. Today, some of the concepts used in the book are seen in today's society. Western and Eastern ideologies of being a man and women are different throughout history. Men abuse the power they have and seem hierarchal against women. Holy Virility is the social construction of masculinity. Men today are taught to act a certain way through gender, men for masculinity and female through acting feminine. Although, men and women can put on a performance of opposite genders. The Holy Virility explains the reasons why do men act the way they do and give concrete information about men's performance.
