= The Madman of Bergerac =

1932 novel by Georges Simenon

- Author: Georges Simenon
- Original title: French: Le Fou de Bergerac
- Language: French
- Series: Inspector Jules Maigret
- Genre: Detective fiction, Crime fiction
- Publisher: Fayard
- Publication date: 1932
- Publication place: France
- English publication date: 1940
- Media type: Print
- Preceded by: The Flemish House
- Followed by: Death of a Harbour Master

The Madman of Bergerac (French: Le Fou de Bergerac) is a 1932 detective novel by Belgian writer Georges Simenon, featuring his character Detective Chief Inspector Jules Maigret. The novel involves Maigret's informal investigation of a suspected serial killer in the French town of Bergerac. It has been twice translated into English and adapted for film and television four times.

== Plot ==
Detective Chief Inspector Maigret of the judicial police takes a train to the Dordogne to visit his friend, Leduc, a retired colleague. He sees a man jump from the train as it slows near a forest. Maigret jumps after him, and the man shoots him in the shoulder. A farmer takes Maigret to the hospital in Bergerac. When Maigret awakes after surgery, he is questioned by local judicial officials who suspect him of being the madman who has recently murdered two local women. After establishing his identity, Maigret moves to a hotel to recuperate, and his wife arrives to nurse him. Maigret decides to conduct an unofficial investigation of the murders from his sick bed and enlists his wife to help.

Maigret learns that Dr Rivaud, the surgeon who operated on him, is rumoured to be having an affair with Françoise Beausoleil, the sister of the doctor's wife Germaine. He also learns that the local public prosecutor, Monsieur Duhourceau, frequently visits Bordeaux where he is rumoured to keep a mistress.

The body of the man who shot Maigret is discovered, and Duhourceau tries to convince Maigret that the dead man was also the madman who murdered the two women and had shot himself after shooting Maigret. Maigret learns that the dead man was Samuel Meyer, a Jewish forger and white slave trader who had murdered two of his accomplices in French Algeria.

Maigret discovers that Rivaud’s mother-in-law lives in Bordeaux. He contacts her and she and Françoise visit him at the hotel. Madame Beausoleil explains that she was a single mother who brought up her two daughters, Germaine and Françoise, in Algiers. Germaine contracted meningitis and spent some time in hospital in Algiers. Germaine enters the hotel room and Françoise flees, meeting Rivaud outside the hotel. Leduc arrives at the hotel and prevents their escape. Rivaud and Françoise run to an unoccupied room in the hotel and commit suicide.

Maigret questions Madame Beausoleil who reveals that Rivaud's real name was Meyer, and he married Germaine after treating her for meningitis in Algiers. He also helped his father, Samuel Meyer, escape to America. Dr Meyer assumed the name Rivaud and moved to Bergerac with his wife and sister-in-law. He gave Madame Beausoleil an allowance to live in Bordeaux. He later fell in love with Françoise who became pregnant to him and gave birth to a daughter at Madame Beausoleil’s home. Duhourceau was present at the birth.

After recovering sufficiently, Maigret visits Duhourceau in his home. Duhourceau confirms Maigret’s suspicion that Duhourceau discovered Rivaud’s true identity, after which Françoise seduced him and claimed she was pregnant to him. Duhourceau supported his supposed daughter and frequently visited her in Bordeaux. Meanwhile, Samuel Meyer returned to France with a compulsion to kill women. Rivaud tried to protect his father but after two local murders, Duhourceau demanded that Rivaud make his father stop. Rivaud instructed his father to jump from the train at a specified meeting place before Bergerac station. There Rivaud shot his father. Maigret takes pity on broken, 65-year-old Duhourceau. He tells him that if Rivaud's widow receives an allowance to live where she wishes, no one will talk. Duhourceau shakes Maigret's hand with gratitude.

== Publication history ==
The novel was first published as Le Fou de Bergerac in 1932 in Paris by Fayard. It has been translated twice into English: in 1940 by Geoffrey Sainsbury as The Madman of Bergerac, and in 2015 by Ros Schwartz with the same title.

== Adaptations ==
The novel has been adapted four times for film and television: in French in 1979 as Maigret et le fou de Bergerac, with Jean Richard in the lead role and in 2002 as Maigret et le fou de Saint-Clothilde, with Bruno Cremer in the main role; in Italian in 1972 as Il pazzo di Bergerac, with Gino Cervi and in English in 1962 as The Madman of Vervac, with Rupert Davies in the main role.

== Bibliography ==
- Simenon, Georges (1932). The Madman of Bergerac. Translated by Schwarz, Ros. London: Penguin Books. ISBN 9780141394565. ;
- Young, Trudee (1976). Georges Simenon, a checklist of his 'Maigret' and other mystery novels and short stories in French and in English translations. Metuchen, N.J.: The Scarecrow Press. ISBN 0-8108-0964-8.
