= Marie Nimier =

French writer (born 1957)

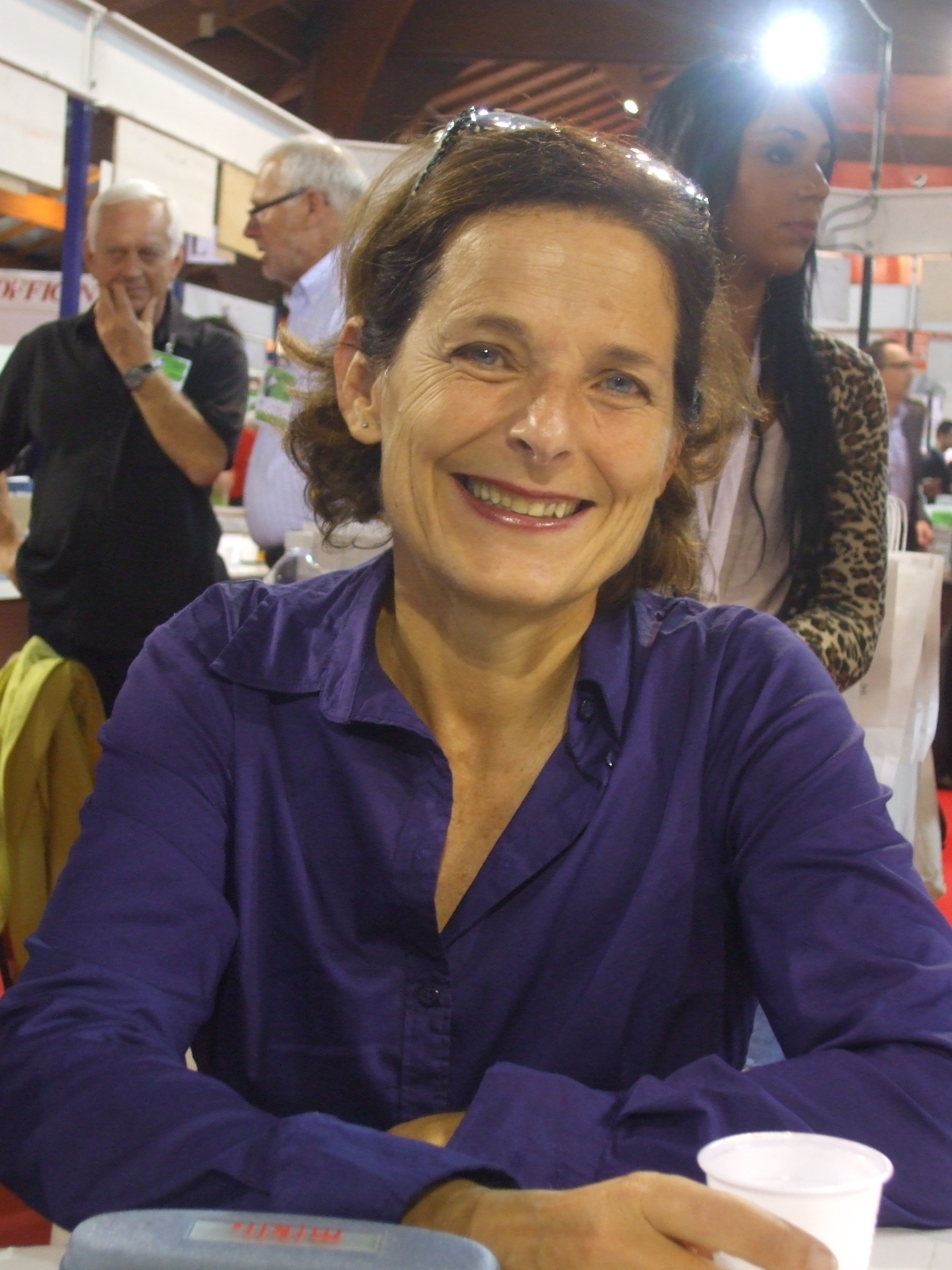
Marie Nimier in 2010

Marie Nimier (born 1957 in Paris) is a French writer.

Her father was the writer Roger Nimier (1925–1962) who was a key figure in the Hussards movement that opposed the French existentialists led by Sartre. She has published numerous books, and her works have been translated into the major European languages. She won the Prix Médicis in 2004 for La Reine du silence, in which she evoked her relationship with her father. She is also a playwright and songwriter.
