= Marie Desplechin =

French writer

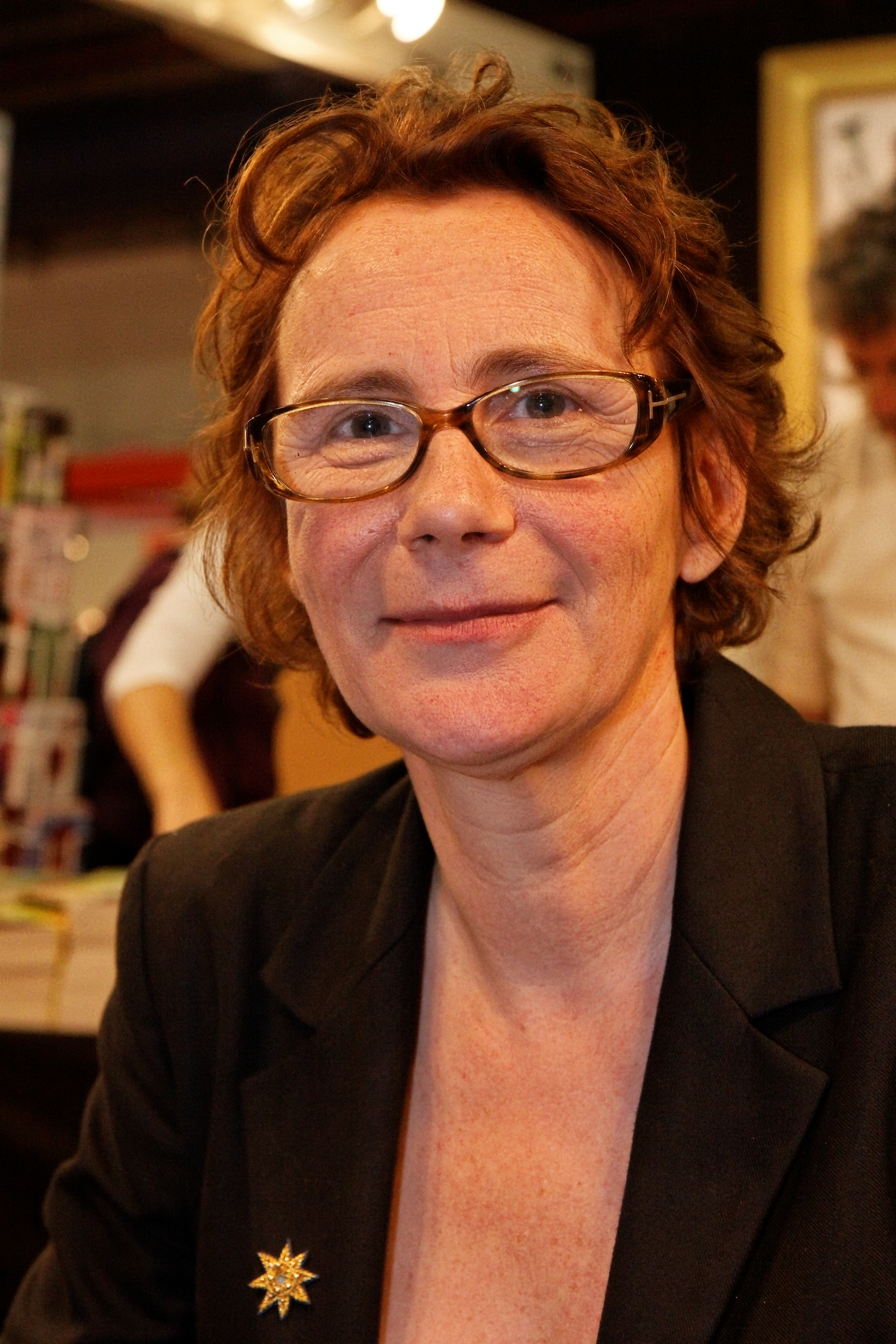
Marie Desplechin in 2011

Marie Desplechin (born Roubaix, Nord, 7 January 1959) is a French writer. She studied literature and journalism before becoming a writer. She is the author of several children's novels and Taking it to Heart, a collection of short stories. Sans Moi, her first novel, has been a great success in France, where it has sold over 120,000 copies. She won the Prix Médicis in 2005 for her book, La Vie sauve.
