= CEATL =

CEATL or the Conseil européen des associations de traducteurs littéraires (European Council of Literary Translators' Associations), is an international non-profit association, based in Belgium, founded in 1993 to facilitate the exchange of information and ideas between literary translators' associations in various European countries, and to promote policies intended to improve the status and the working conditions of literary translators.

== History ==
The idea of founding CEATL was first mooted during an informal meeting during the 1987 Assises de la traduction littéraire in Arles.

CEATL was officially established as an international non-profit association in 1993. The founding members included translators' associations from Austria, Belgium, France, Germany, Greece, Italy, the Netherlands, Spain and Switzerland.

As of 2023, the CEATL comprises 36 literary translators' associations in 27 European countries, representing some 10,000 individual translators.

== Goals ==
The CEATL gathers information on the status of literary translation and the working conditions of literary translators in member countries and shares information together with examples of best practice observed in these countries. It regularly conducts statistical surveys on matters relating to literary translation, including legal status, working conditions and more recently the use of AI in literary translation.

In addition, it defends the legal, social and economic interests of literary translators in Europe in a variety of ways, including lobbying the European Union and issuing statements about issues and trends that affect the profession or the quality of literary translation. It also strives to help member associations to improve the position of literary translators in their respective countries.

CEATL publishes a free, bilingual e-zine called Contrepoint/Counterpoint, which is published twice a year.

== Procedure ==
Delegates from member associations meet for an annual AGM, which is hosted by national associations in turn. The executive committee of CEATL is made up of at least three elected members who serve for a term of two years, but may stand for reelection The executive committee is tasked with implementing the resolutions passed during the annual AGM, together with any other initiatives necessary required to achieve the goals of the CEATL.

A number of working groups (Working Conditions, Copyright, Visibility, Training and Education, Best Practices) meet during the course of the year to work on specific projects.

In October 2024, CEATL organised an inaugural European conference on literary translation in Strasbourg focusing on "the circulation of translated works in Europe and beyond," with a program of some 80 participants from a reported 30 countries.
