= Maigret in New York =

1947 novel by Georges Simenon

- Author: Georges Simenon
- Original title: French: Maigret à New York
- Translator: Adrienne Foulke, Linda Coverdale
- Language: French
- Series: Inspector Jules Maigret
- Genre: Detective fiction, Crime fiction
- Publisher: Presses de la Cité
- Publication date: July 1947
- Publication place: Belgium
- English publication date: 1955
- Media type: Print
- Preceded by: Maigret in Retirement
- Followed by: A Summer Holiday

Maigret in New York (other English-language titles include Maigret in New York's Underworld and Inspector Maigret in New York's Underworld; French: Maigret à New York) is a detective novel by Belgian writer Georges Simenon, featuring his character inspector Jules Maigret. The novel was written between February 27 and March 6, 1946, in Sainte-Marguerite-du-Lac-Masson, Quebec, Canada. The novel was published in serial form in the newspaper L'Aurore, between 25 June 1946 and 7 August 1946, and in book form in July 1947 by Presses de la Cité.

== Synopsis ==
Maigret somewhat impulsively leaves retirement to assist a French-born law student who fears for his father's life. Arriving in New York City, however, his client immediately vanishes upon docking. Acting in a private capacity, Maigret now has two mysteries to solve. Fortunately he has the assistance of a jocular FBI agent with a professional, albeit tangential interest in the matter, and an alcoholic private investigator in delving into the city's immigrant past. And Maigret with his methods proves not to be as much a fish-out-of-water as he may seem.

== Translations ==
The book has been translated and published under different titles: in 1955 as Maigret in New York and as Maigret in New York's Underworld , in 1956 as Inspector Maigret in New York's Underworld, all translated by Adrienne Foulke; in 2016 as Maigret in New York translated by Linda Coverdale.

The first German translation by Bernhard Jolles was published by Kiepenheuer & Witsch in 1956.

== Adaptation ==
- Maigret à New York, starring Jean Richard and Raymond Pellegrin (1990).

== Literature ==
- Maurice Piron, Michel Lemoine, L'Univers de Simenon, guide des romans et nouvelles (1931-1972) de Georges Simenon, Presses de la Cité, 1983, p. 306-307 ISBN 978-2-258-01152-6 (in French)
