= Maigret Gets Angry =

1947 detective novel by Georges Simenon

Maigret gets angry
- Author: Georges Simenon
- Original title: Maigret se fâche
- Translator: Jean Steward
- Language: French
- Series: Inspector Jules Maigret
- Genre: Detective fiction
- Publisher: Presses de la Cité
- Publication date: 1947
- English publication date: 1976
- Media type: Print
- Preceded by: Maigret's Rival
- Followed by: Maigret in New York

Maigret Gets Angry (French: Maigret se fâche) is a 1947 detective novel by the Belgian mystery writer Georges Simenon featuring Jules Maigret.

== Synopsis ==
Two years into his retirement at Meung-sur-Loire, Maigret has yet to be tempted to take on a case. But 82-year-old Bernadette Amorelle, the widow of Amorelle of Amorelle and Campois, the major gravel and barge company on the Seine, shows up at his door and virtually orders him to Orsennes, where her 18-year-old granddaughter, Monita Malik, has been found dead in the Seine. Maigret arrives and finds an old acquaintance from his days at lycée in Moulins, Ernest Malik, who they'd called "The Tax Collector" after his father's occupation, the sort of man Maigret instinctively disliked. It is made clear that Maigret's presence in Orsennes is unwelcome, but Maigret is intrigued by the apparent disappearance of Malik's younger son, Georges-Henry Malik.

Maigret returns to Paris to investigate further and to enlist the services of Mimile, an old circus hand, with whose help he rescues the boy from the cellar his father has imprisoned him in. The mystery is finally unraveled when Bernadette shoots and kills her son-in-law Ernest, and Maigret returns to hear her story. Malik had been a gambler, and enticed Désiré Campois' son, Roger Campois, into gambling way over his head, until he committed suicide, thus freeing Amorelle's daughter from her engagement, and giving Ernest room to marry into the family. He was more intrigued by the younger daughter, Aimée Amorelle, who bore his child, Monita, but not before he had brought his younger brother, Charles Malik, in to marry Aimée, eventually forcing Old Campois from power, and conquering all but Bernadette. The daughter, Monita, had learned the secret, and shared it with Georges-Henry.

== Publication history ==
This Maigret story was first published in French in 38 instalments in the newspaper France-Soir between March and May 1946 and in 1947 by Presses de la Cité in book-form preceded in this same volume by the short-story La pipe de Maigret. It was translated into English by Jean Steward in 1976 and published by Hamish Hamilton in London as part of the anthology, Maigret's Christmas, and independently in the US edition published by Harcourt Brace Jovanovich. In December 2015, this novel was reissued in English by Penguin under the title Maigret Gets Angry (ISBN 9780141397320), newly translated by Ros Schwartz.

== Adaptations ==
A BBC TV version entitled The Dirty House aired on 26 November 1963. Rupert Davies played Maigret.

A French television version with Jean Richard as Maigret aired on 1 February 1969.
