= A Summer Holiday =

1948 novel by Georges Simenon

- Author: Georges Simenon
- Original title: French: Les Vacances de Maigret
- Language: French
- Series: Inspector Jules Maigret
- Genre: Detective fiction, crime fiction
- Publisher: Presses de la Cité
- Publication date: 1948
- Publication place: Belgium
- English publication date: 1950
- Media type: Print
- Preceded by: Maigret in New York
- Followed by: Maigret's Dead Man

A Summer Holiday (other English-language titles include No Vacation for Maigret, Maigret on Holiday, and Maigret's Holiday; French: Les Vacances de Maigret) is a detective novel by Belgian writer Georges Simenon, featuring his character inspector Jules Maigret. The novel was written between November 11 and November 20, 1947, in Tucson, Arizona, United States. The book was published in the following year by Presses de la Cité.

== Translations ==
The book has been translated into English under different titles: in 1950 as A Summer Holiday and in 1953 as No Vacation for Maigret by Geoffrey Sainsbury; in 1970 as Maigret on Holiday by Jacqueline Baldick; in 2016 as Maigret's Holiday by Ros Schwartz.

The first German translation by Jean Raimond was published by Kiepenheuer & Witsch in 1956. The new translation by Markus Jakob was published by Diogenes Verlag in 1985.

== Adaptations ==
The novel has been adapted several times for cinema and television:

In French

- 1956: as Maigret en Vacances, starring Henri Norbert as Maigret;
- 1971: as Maigret en vacances, with Jean Richard in the lead role;
- 1995: as Les Vacances de Maigret, with Bruno Cremer;

In English

- 1961: as On Holiday, starring Rupert Davies;

In Dutch

- 1968: as Maigret met vakantie (Maigret on Holiday), starring Jan Teulings.

== Bibliography ==
- Maurice Piron, Michel Lemoine, L'Univers de Simenon, guide des romans et nouvelles (1931–1972) de Georges Simenon, Presses de la Cité, 1983, p. 308-309 ISBN 978-2-258-01152-6 (in French)
