= Red Lights (novel) =

1953 novel by Georges Simenon

- First edition
- Author: Georges Simenon
- Original title: Feux rouges
- Translator: Norman Denny
- Language: French
- Genre: Roman dur
- Publisher: Presses de la Cite
- Publication date: 1953
- Media type: Print
- Pages: 154 (NYRB)

Feux rouges (Red Lights) is the title of a short novel by Belgian writer Georges Simenon. It is one of the author's roman durs or "hard novels".

The novel is divided into eight chapters, and is written using the third-person narrative mode. In the story, set in north-eastern United States, a couple's road trip to fetch their children from summer camp becomes a nightmare for each of them.

== Plot ==
Steve Hogan works in an office in Madison Avenue, and his wife Nancy has a successful career as a personal secretary. They leave New York on Labor Day weekend to fetch their two children from summer camp in Maine. Many others parents are doing the same thing, and the roads are crowded. They hear on the radio that a prisoner, Sid Halligan, has escaped from Sing Sing. Steve and Nancy argue: she says he has drunk too much before they left. They stop at a bar and, to prevent Nancy driving on, he takes the car keys before going to the bar. He returns to find a note that she is going by coach.

He drives on, stops at another bar and offers a drink to a stranger, feeling he has an affinity with him. The stranger does not speak, and leaves; returning to the car, Steve finds the stranger inside, and realizes he is the escaped prisoner Halligan. He has a gun. Steve drives on, asking Halligan about his past, and talking about Nancy. A tyre blows; Halligan changes the wheel as Steve is too drunk. He wakes up later in the car. Halligan has driven on until there was another blow-out, and has disappeared. Steve gets a lift to a garage and, while they repair the car, he phones the summer camp. Nancy is not there, nor is she at hotels there. He notices a newspaper report that a woman, clearly Nancy from the description, has been attacked and was found unconscious by the roadside. After more phone calls, he finds the hospital.

Before he can see Nancy he is interrogated by a policeman; he thinks Steve might have attacked her. He learns later that she was raped by Halligan. Steve sees Nancy, who is unable to say much. He tells her: "I met a man in whom, for hours, I tried to see another me, another me that wasn't a coward.... I spilled out everything that was on my mind.... Yet I knew who that man was and where he had come from!... I had a drunkard's determination to soil everything...." He feels that he and Nancy have come closer together.

Halligan is captured, and Steve asks to see him. "He gazed at him for a long time, as he had set himself to do, because it had seemed to him necessary before starting on their new life."

== English language editions ==
This novel and The Watchmaker of Everton, both translated by Norman Denny, were published together in 1955 by Hamish Hamilton as Danger Ahead.

It was reissued by New York Review Books in 2006, with an introduction by Anita Brookner.

== Film adaptation ==
The French film Red Lights (2004), set in present-day France, is based on the novel.
