= Maigret's Dead Man =

1948 novel by Georges Simenon

- First edition
- Author: Georges Simenon
- Original title: Maigret et son mort
- Language: French
- Series: Inspector Jules Maigret
- Release number: 29
- Genre: Detective fiction
- Publisher: Presses de la Cité
- Publication date: 1948
- Media type: Print
- Preceded by: A Summer Holiday
- Followed by: Maigret's First Case

Maigret's Dead Man (French: Maigret et son mort), also translated as Maigret and His Dead Man and Maigret’s Special Murder, is a 1948 detective novel by the Belgian novelist Georges Simenon featuring the fictional character Jules Maigret. It was Simenon's 29th Maigret novel.

== Plot ==
A man telephones for Maigret from a café and saying that he is being followed. Without finishing the call he hangs up. He attempts to call Maigret from different cafés, then the calls cease. Then a body is found in the Place de la Concorde badly beaten and stabbed. It was observed being dumped from a car.

== Adaptations ==
Maigret's Dead Man has been dramatized six times:

- In 1961, in the BBC television series Maigret with Rupert Davies, as "The Winning Ticket"
- In the Dutch TV series starring Jan Teulings in 1966
- In the French TV series starring Jean Richard in 1970
- In 1978, in the Japanese series starring Kinya Aikawa as Keishi to satsujinshatachi ("Killers")
- In 1986, for BBC Radio 4's Saturday Night Theatre as Maigret's Special Murder, starring Bernard Hepton
- The second episode of ITV's 2016 series Maigret with Rowan Atkinson as Maigret.
