= The Bottom of the Bottle (novel) =

1949 novel by Georges Simenon

- Author: Georges Simenon
- Original title: Le Fond de la Bouteille
- Translator: Cornelia Schaeffer
- Language: French
- Genre: Psychological novel
- Published: 1949 Presses de la Cité
- Publisher: 1954 Doubleday (US); 1977 Hamish Hamilton (UK)
- Media type: Print
- OCLC: 3540323

The Bottom of the Bottle is a novel by the Belgian writer Georges Simenon. The original French version Le Fond de la Bouteille, written in 1948 when Simenon was living in Arizona, appeared in 1949. The novel is among his romans durs, a term roughly translated as hard, or harrowing, novels; it was used by Simenon for what he regarded as his serious literary works.

The story is set in Arizona near the Mexican border: a rancher's life is disrupted by the appearance of his brother, who has escaped from jail and is determined to get across the Santa Cruz River to Mexico.

== Summary ==
Patrick Martin Ashbridge, known as P.M., is a lawyer and rancher in Arizona near the border with Mexico. Returning home from a bar as rain ends a dry period, he discovers his brother Donald by his ranch. P.M. has not seen him for a long time and hardly knows his recent life. He read in newspapers that Donald was imprisoned for wounding a police officer; he also had letters about him from their sister Emily, who has a career in Los Angeles. Don has escaped from Joliet Prison and wants to cross the Santa Cruz River to Mexico. The river, higher because of the rain, is now impossible to cross. P.M. tells his wife Nora that Don is his friend Eric Bell, who has been ill and is not allowed to drink.

As he talks to Don, P.M. thinks back about their early family life in poor circumstances, and the different lives of Don, Emily and himself. P.M.'s first marriage ended when he had ambitions to become a lawyer; his wealth has come from his second wife Nora. Don, despite his desperate past, seems to be critical of P.M.'s career.

At a party at a neighbouring ranch, P.M. gets a phone call from Emily, who talks to Don; this increases the guests' curiosity about him. Emily gave Don money to reach Arizona and is anxious that Don should reach Nogales just over the border, where his wife Mildred and children are living in desperate circumstances. P.M. goes home with Don for him to phone Mildred, and Don starts to drink. Don has an aggressive attitude to P.M., determined that P.M. must help him across the river. Back at the party, Don, getting increasingly drunk, hits P.M. who returns with blows; they are separated, and Don disappears.

Nora, on being told all about Don, says she had guessed he was P.M.'s brother. In their car, they look for him. At the Santa Cruz River, where people often drive to look at the river when it is high, they meet Falk, a neighbour who lives alone; he tells them food, alcohol and a gun were stolen from his house. P.M. hears that Don was told about a likely crossing place at Mule Pass, and he leaves home on a horse, having chosen the best one for crossing the river. He meets Falk on the way and they ride together. They find Don at the river. P.M. gives Don his horse and, borrowing Falk's horse, follows Don across: Don reaches the other side, but P.M. is swept away.

== Film ==
The book was made into the 1956 film The Bottom of the Bottle, directed by Henry Hathaway and featuring Joseph Cotten as P.M., Van Johnson as Donald and Ruth Roman as Nora.
