= The Cat (novel) =

1967 novel by Georges Simenon

- First edition
- Author: Georges Simenon
- Original title: Le Chat
- Language: French
- Genre: Psychological fiction Black comedy
- Publisher: Presses de la Cité
- Publication date: 1967
- Publication place: France

The Cat (French: Le Chat) is a novel by the Belgian writer Georges Simenon, released in 1967.

== Overview ==
The novel was written, usually for Simenon, within a short period of two weeks between September and October 1966. It was published in France in 1967 by Presses de la Cité, after Simenon had already released around 200 other books. The work bears elements of psychological fiction and black comedy. It tells a story of an elderly married couple in their early 70s, who have been loathing each other for years for killing each other's pets. They have not been talking, their only form of communication being occasional notes on scraps of paper. However, they are soon to understand that they cannot live without each other. The storyline of The Cat is speculated to have originated from the author's difficult relationship with his mother.

The Cat met with positive reception, receiving a favorable review from Richard Boston of The New York Times. The English version was released by Hamish Hamilton, translated by Bernard Frechtman. Pierre Granier-Deferre adapted the story into a film, which premiered in 1971 in France as Le Chat, and starred Jean Gabin and Simone Signoret.
