= André Rouyer =

French actor

- Born: 20 June 1929; Argentan, France
- Died: 28 January 1994 (aged 64); Gif-sur-Yvette, France
- Occupation: Actor
- Years active: 1956-1994

André Rouyer (20 June 1929 – 28 January 1994) was a French film actor, born in Argentan. He appeared in 60 films between 1956 and 1994.

== Selected filmography ==
- Forgive Us Our Trespasses (1956)
- Rapt au deuxième bureau (1958)
- Le concerto de la peur (1963) - Rif, le complice de Valdo
- Angélique, Marquise des Anges (1964) - Clément Tonnel
- The Vampire of Düsseldorf (1965)
- La tête du client (1965) - Le gardien de prison (uncredited)
- La Métamorphose des cloportes (1965) - Un client du cabaret (uncredited)
- Et la femme créa l'amour (1966) - Un joueur de poker (uncredited)
- Tender Scoundrel (1966) - Un turfiste (uncredited)
- Is Paris Burning? (1966) - (uncredited)
- Un idiot à Paris (1967) - Un étudiant (uncredited)
- Mise à sac (1967) - Rotenbach
- Le Temps des loups (1970)
- La Horse (1970) -Un voisin
- Last Leap (1970) - Salvade
- Point de chute (1970)
- L'amour, oui! Mais... (1970) - L'avocat
- Distracted (1970) - L'habitant de Sarcelles (uncredited)
- Le Chat (1971) - Le délégué
- Le Saut de l'ange (1971) - Rigaux, un officier de police
- The Widow Couderc (1971) - Policeman
- Chronique d'un couple (1971)
- Caméléons (1971) - Pierre
- Coup pour coup (1972)
- Un cave (1972)
- Justine de Saden (1972) - Antonin
- Hearth Fires (1972) - L'orateur lors de la manifestation
- L'humeur vagabonde (1972) - Cazal
- Plot (1972)
- Zahltag (1973)
- Décembre (1973) - L'aumônier
- Le complot (1973)
- Fantastic Planet (1973) - (voice)
- R.A.S. (1973)
- Défense de savoir (1973)
- Two Men in Town (1973) - Le capitaine des C.R.S. (uncredited)
- The Train (1973) - Le mécanicien de la locomotive
- Die Ameisen kommen (1974) - Lino
- The Phantom of Liberty (1974) - Le brigadier
- Le mâle du siècle (1975) - Le commissaire
- Le futur aux trousses (1975)
- Maîtresse (1975) - Mario
- I Am Pierre Riviere (1976) - Le président du tribunal
- Violette & François (1977) - Le vigile du premier grand magasin
- La question (1977) - Capitaine Lavisse
- The Accuser (1977) - Rumin, le délégué syndical
- Le beaujolais nouveau est arrivé (1978)
- Le Mors aux dents (1979) - Le patron du tabac '16e'
- Tout dépend des filles... (1980) - Le patron bord de mer
- La bande du Rex (1980) - L'inspecteur Robert
- La gueule du loup (1981) - Un inspecteur
- Le démon dans l'île (1983) - Georges Cotier - le propriétaire du supermarché
- Le thé à la menthe (1984) - L'agent de police (Place de la Concorde)
- Le transfuge (1985)
- Le voyage à Paimpol (1985) - Le père de Maryvonne
- La maison assassinée (1988) - Didon Pujol
