= Red Lights (2004 film) =

- Theatrical Poster
- Directed by: Cédric Kahn
- Screenplay by: Cédric Kahn; Laurence Ferreira Barbosa; Gilles Marchand
- Based on: Red Lights (novel); 1995 novel by Georges Simenon
- Produced by: Patrick Godeau
- Starring: Jean-Pierre Darroussin; Carole Bouquet; Vincent Deniard
- Cinematography: Patrick Blossier
- Edited by: Yan Dedet
- Music by: Claude Debussy; Arvo Pärt
- Distributed by: BAC Films
- Release dates: 10 February 2004 (Berlinale); 3 March 2004 (France)
- Running time: 105 minutes
- Country: France
- Language: French
- Budget: €5.3 million
- Box office: $2.4 million

Red Lights (French: Feux rouges) is a 2004 French thriller film directed by Cédric Kahn. It was adapted from the eponymous 1955 Georges Simenon novel set in the Northeastern United States. The film is set in modern-day France.

The film stars Jean-Pierre Darroussin and Carole Bouquet as married couple Antoine and Hélène Dunan on a road trip to pick up their children and begin a vacation. After a number of arguments, they are separated and each encounters a horror on the road.

== Plot ==
One summer mid-afternoon, Antoine (Darroussin) leaves his insurance firm job to meet up with his wife Hélène (Bouquet), as they are to fetch their kids (somewhere distant, but it is not explained exactly where they are or who they're with), and then head on to his in-laws' place in the Basque Country for two weeks' vacation. He wants to beat the traffic (and the two million cars that will be on the road). They arrange to meet at a local bar, but she arrives late, annoying him. When she arrives, it's clear their relations have been strained for some time.

Hélène wants to go home to shower and have a quick cold dinner, so they do, further frustrating him. They finally get on the road, but after a while the heavy traffic gets to Antoine, and he decides to get off the highway and take "the back way", at least to Tours. Though tired, he won't let Hélène drive, and they bicker. He stops several times along the way for a drink or two at local bars, while she sits in the car. He becomes slightly inebriated, heightening the tension and arguments between them. Hélène reaches a breaking point when Antoine stops again, and threatens to drive on without him, telling him he can take the train and meet her later. He takes the car keys and goes into the bar, where, as he drinks, he sees a TV news item about a man who has escaped from a nearby prison. When he leaves the bar and returns to his car, Hélène is not there, having left him a note: "I’m taking the train."

Somewhat frantic, Antoine drives to the nearest train station to look for her, but the last train of the night has left. He drives on to the next stop, but is delayed at a police checkpoint where they're looking for the escaped convict. After arriving at the station after midnight and 25 minutes too late, he again goes to a bar to drown his sorrows. He tries to strike up a conversation with a large, quiet man who is not particularly interested in chatting and leaves while Antoine is not looking.

When he leaves the bar, Antoine finds the large man outside, asking to hitch a ride to Bordeaux, to which Antoine agrees. After being on the road awhile, Antoine realizes the man (Vincent Deniard) is the escaped convict, but this thrills him more than scaring him. He openly admires the escapee for his "independent" spirit, and they manage to get through another checkpoint.

Antoine stops for gasoline, and gets a small bottle of whiskey too, downing it almost completely. The convict is annoyed at his drinking, but soon falls asleep, when Antoine, drunk, runs off the road, causing a flat tire. The convict demands he change it, but Antoine passes out, so the convict does. The convict slaps Antoine awake, and they get back on the road to Bordeaux. Not much later the convict turns off the road, causing them to argue, and beats Antoine. When he comes to, Antoine finds the convict dragging him from the car out in the woods, likely to be killed and left there. Antoine says, "Make it fast and clean; I don't want to suffer." While the convict retrieves the tire jack from the car to use as a weapon, Antoine hides. The convict finds him and they struggle, Antoine getting hold of the jack, which he uses to beat the convict to death.

He tries to leave, but disables the car, and eventually hitches a ride to town. After making arrangements to get the car fixed, he makes more than a dozen phone calls attempting to find his wife. Finally succeeding, he discovers she is hospitalized after being wounded in an "incident" at the Poitiers train station. Antoine goes to the hospital, whereupon police lieutenant Levet (Jean-Pierre Gos) notifies him his wife was beaten, robbed, and raped by the dangerous convict, whose body has been discovered. Antoine explains to the lieutenant what happened between him and Hélène, but omits his subsequent "adventure". The lieutenant likely suspects Antoine, but chooses to not pursue the matter.

Antoine suffers a flashback nightmare as Hélène is recovering, realizing the terrible things he has done. He finally gets to see Hélène and apologises for everything. They reconcile and express their love for each other. After another day, they leave the hospital to fetch their kids. The last scene is of them driving happily and quietly down a country road.

== Cast ==
- Jean-Pierre Darroussin as Antoine Dunan
- Carole Bouquet as Hélène Dunan
- Jean-Pierre Gos as The Inspector
- Mylène Demongeot as The summer camp director
- Vincent Deniard as L'homme en cavale (man on the run/convict)

== Reception ==
Critical reaction to the film was mostly positive. On Rotten Tomatoes, the film holds an approval rating of 83% based on 86 reviews, with an average rating of 7.1/10. The site's critical consensus reads, "Red Lights is a taut, character-driven thriller, set against the debris-strewn battleground of a failing marriage." On Metacritic the film has a score of 74 out of 100, based on 28 critics, indicating "generally favorable reviews".

The New York Times reviewer Stephen Holden called the film a "brilliant, sinister French thriller".

== Accolades ==
Award / Film Festival	Category	Recipients and nominees	Result
Berlin International Film Festival	Golden Bear		Nominated
Independent Spirit Awards	Best International Film		Nominated
