= The Widow Couderc =

- La veuve Couderc
- Directed by: Pierre Granier-Deferre
- Written by: Pascal Jardin; Pierre Granier-Deferre
- Based on: novel by Georges Simenon
- Produced by: Raymond Danon
- Starring: Simone Signoret; Alain Delon
- Cinematography: Walter Wottitz
- Edited by: Jean Ravel
- Music by: Philippe Sarde
- Production companies: Lira Films (Paris); Pegaso Films (Rome)
- Distributed by: Compagnie Française de Distribution Cinématographique (CFDC)
- Release date: 13 October 1971
- Running time: 89 minutes
- Country: France
- Language: French
- Box office: 2,008,203 admissions (France)

The Widow Couderc (French: La veuve Couderc) is a 1971 French drama film based on the 1942 novel of the same name by Georges Simenon.

== Plot ==
In 1934, in a little village on a canal in Burgundy (Cheuge), a laconic young stranger called Jean is walking along the road when an older woman in black gets off a bus with a heavy load. He helps her carry it to her farm, where she offers him work and a room. He accepts, and soon she is in his bed. She is the widow Couderc, running the farm single-handed with her infirm father-in-law. Across the canal live her sister-in-law and ineffectual husband, who are trying to evict the widow and gain the property. They have a 16-year-old daughter, Félicie, who has already managed to have a baby, father uncertain.

Jean enjoys helping on the farm, but will reveal little of his past. His father was rich, he says, and he wanted to become a doctor but killed a man, ending up in jail from which he has escaped. The widow accepts his story, but her trust is strained when he can't resist sleeping with the alluring Félicie as well. The situation is taken out of her hands when her sister-in-law denounces Jean to the police, who surround the farm at dawn. When Jean fires on them, both he and the widow are killed in the ensuing fusillade.

== Cast ==
- Simone Signoret - Tati Couderc
- Alain Delon - Jean Lavigne
- Ottavia Piccolo - Félicie
- Jean Tissier - Henri Couderc
- Monique Chaumette - Françoise
- Boby Lapointe - Désiré
- Pierre Collet - commissaire Mallet
- François Valorbe - colonel Luc de Mortemont
- Jean-Pierre Castaldi

== Reception ==
The film opened at number one at the box office in Paris with a first week gross of $163,000.
