= The Watchmaker of Everton =

1955 novel by Georges Simenon

- Author: Georges Simenon
- Original title: L'horloger d'Everton
- Translator: Norman Denny
- Language: French
- Genre: Psychological novel
- Published: in Danger Ahead; 1955 Hamish Hamilton (UK)

The Watchmaker of Everton (French: L'horloger d'Everton) is a novel by the Belgian writer Georges Simenon. The original French version appeared in 1954. This novel and Red Lights, both translated by Norman Denny, were published together in 1955 by Hamish Hamilton as Danger Ahead.

The novel is among his romans durs, a term roughly translated as hard, or harrowing, novels; it was used by Simenon for what he regarded as his serious literary works.

The novel is set in a village in the State of New York. Simenon lived in America from 1945 to 1955.

== Summary ==
The story is seen from the viewpoint of David Galloway, a watchmaker who lives with his sixteen-year-old son Ben in a village in New York state. His routine is broken when Ben does not come home one evening; his suitcase has gone and he has taken Galloway's van.

The ensuing events are punctuated with Galloway's recollections of his past life: when his wife Ruth left him, leaving him with baby Ben, and finding fragments of torn-up farewell messages that Ruth had abandoned; his own early childhood in Virginia before the death of his father, a farmer there; meeting Ruth in Waterbury and deciding to marry her, although she said "You aren't the sort of man to live with a woman like me".

He learns from his neighbour Isabel Hawkins that Ben and her daughter Lillian have gone together. The police arrive, but Galloway does not find out what has happened until he is at Hortonville police station: his van has been abandoned, and Ben and Lillian are now travelling in a car whose driver Ben has shot dead.

Back home, Galloway is visited by journalists and photographers; a journalist with a tape-recorder visits and Galloway records a message for his son, to be played on the radio, in which he says "It's better for you to give yourself up... I shall always be on your side...." An FBI man, looking through Ben's belongings, takes away an almanac which has crosses against Illinois and Mississippi, states having low minimum ages for the granting of marriage licences.

He hears on the radio that Ben and Lillian have been arrested in Indiana and have been taken to Indianapolis. He travels there by plane. In the Federal Building he learns that Ben has refused to see him, and is being taken to Liberty, the capital of the county in New York State where the murder was committed. He is told that Ben and Lillian, while held in the building, were "gazing ecstatically into each other's eyes. Anyone not knowing the facts... would have taken them for the happiest pair on earth." In Liberty he hires a lawyer; after seeing Ben, the lawyer tells Galloway he hoped he could deny premeditation, but Ben said he had made plans weeks ahead. The lawyer angrily says to Galloway that "you've lived sixteen years with a boy like him without noticing anything".

There is a trial before a grand jury; they decide that Ben and Lillian are to be sent before the County High Court. There they are convicted of murder, the death sentence commuted to imprisonment for life. Galloway returns to his former routine, except that he regularly visits Ben in Sing Sing prison.

== Film adaptation ==
The 1974 film L'horloger de Saint-Paul (English titles The Watchmaker of St Paul, The Clockmaker) was based on the novel; it was the first feature film of the French director Bertrand Tavernier. The modified story is set in his home city of Lyon, and features Philippe Noiret as the watchmaker.
