= The Bottom of the Bottle =

1956 film

- Directed by: Henry Hathaway
- Written by: Sydney Boehm
- Based on: The Bottom of the Bottle by Georges Simenon
- Produced by: Buddy Adler
- Starring: Joseph Cotten; Van Johnson; Ruth Roman
- Cinematography: Lee Garmes
- Edited by: David Bretherton
- Music by: Leigh Harline
- Production company: 20th Century Fox
- Distributed by: 20th Century Fox
- Release date: February 1, 1956
- Running time: 88 minutes
- Country: United States
- Language: English
- Budget: $1,695,000
- Box office: $1,100,000 (US rentals)

The Bottom of the Bottle is a 1956 American CinemaScope drama film directed by Henry Hathaway and starring Joseph Cotten, Van Johnson and Ruth Roman. It is based on the novel of the same title written by Georges Simenon during his stay in Nogales, Arizona. The novel was adapted for film by Sydney Boehm and was produced and distributed by 20th Century Fox.

== Plot ==
Patrick Martin (Joseph Cotten), known as P.M., is a wealthy attorney and rancher in the border town of Nogales, Arizona. He returns home to find his brother Donald (Van Johnson) hiding in his garage. A former drunkard, Donald had been sent to the penitentiary five years previously for killing a man in a barroom brawl. It was in self-defense but P.M. hadn't defended his brother and he was convicted.

Donald has escaped and wants his brother to help him across the Santa Cruz River into the Mexico-side Nogales, where his wife (Shawn Smith) and children (Kim Charney and Sandy Descher) are in dire straits. The straits get even more dire when P.M. tells him the river is flooded and it will be days before anyone can cross.

P.M. is all atwitter because his wife Nora (Ruth Roman), whom he married after Donald had gone to prison, doesn't know about his jail-bird brother. He introduces Donald to Nora and the rest of his Cadillac Cowboy and ranch society friends as an old friend, Eric Bell, and is kept busy trying to make sure Donald doesn't find anything harder than ginger ale to drink.

Donald gets a telephone call telling him that his family has gone from dire straits to destitution, and when P.M. refuses to help through his contacts in the Mexico side of Nogales, Donald knocks him down, grabs a couple of bottles of whiskey and dashes out of the house into the rain.

Nora eventually discovers Donald's true identity and persuades P.M. to help Donald's family. But after a report that Donald has committed a theft, Hal Breckinridge (Jack Carson) forms a posse to bring Donald back. P.M. is reluctant to aid a felon, but eventually shows Donald a place in the river to cross safely into Mexico, but falls off his horse and then nearly drowns. Donald saves his life, then surrenders to the law.

== Cast ==
- Joseph Cotten as P.M.
- Van Johnson as Donald
- Ruth Roman as Nora
- Jack Carson as Breckinridge
- Brad Dexter as Miller
- Jim Davis as Cady
- Margaret Lindsay as Hannah Cady
- Nancy Gates as Mildred Martin
- Pedro Gonzalez Gonzalez as Luis Romero
- John Lee as Jenkins
- Tod Griffin as Rancher
- Ernestine Barrier as Lucy Grant
- Walter Woolf King as Grant
- Sandy Descher as Annie Martin - Donald's Daughter
- Harry Morgan as Felix - Barkeep
- Mimi Gibson as Jeanie Martin - Donald's Daughter

== See also ==
- List of American films of 1956
