= Les Fiançailles de M. Hire =

1933 novel by Georges Simenon

The Engagement
- First edition
- Author: Georges Simenon
- Original title: Les Fiançailles de M. Hire
- Translator: Anna Moschovakis
- Language: French
- Genre: Mystery Novel
- Publisher: Éditions Fayard
- Publication date: 1933
- Media type: Print
- Pages: 135 (NYRB)

Les Fiançailles de M. Hire (Monsieur Hire's Engagement) is a short novel by Belgian writer Georges Simenon. It is one of the author's first self-described roman durs or "hard novels" to distinguish it from his romans populaires or "popular novels," which are primarily mysteries that usually feature his famous Inspector Maigret character.

The novel is divided into eleven chapters, and is written using the third-person narrative mode.

== Plot ==
Monsieur Hire, a small-time crook of Jewish origin, lives a lonely isolated life without female companionship (apart from his visits to the brothel). Unpopular with his neighbors, he becomes the ideal suspect for the murder of a young prostitute whose corpse is found in a vacant lot near his home. The police place him under 24-hour surveillance and wait for him to do anything suspicious.

Once a week, Hire is the unlikely star of a Parisian bowling club, where people think he works for the police. Apart from his passion for bowling, Hire is a peeping Tom and obsessed with the voyeuristic observation of his neighbor Alice. During his nocturnal observations, he is able to identify the perpetrator of the crime who is none other than Alice's boyfriend. Believing that Alice loves him, he does not denounce her boyfriend in order to protect her. At the moment of his arrest, with a lynch mob pursuing him, Hire takes refuge on the roof of a building but falls to his death and dies in the arms of firefighters.

== English language editions ==
Les Fiançailles de M. Hire has been translated into English twice: once by Daphne Woodward as Mr. Hire's Engagement for Hamish Hamilton in 1956, and a second time by Anna Moschovakis as The Engagement for New York Review Books in 2007. The former version also appeared as The Sacrifice, comprising Mr. Hire's Engagement and Young Cardinaud as well as in one of the Simenon Omnibuses; the latter edition contains an afterword by John N. Gray.

== Film and television versions ==
The book has been filmed four times: Panic (Panique) by Julien Duvivier in 1946, starring Michel Simon and Viviane Romance; in Spanish language as Barrio by Ladislao Vajda in 1947 and Portuguese as Viela (Rua Sem Sol), both in 1947; and as Monsieur Hire by Patrice Leconte in 1989, starring Michel Blanc and Sandrine Bonnaire.

It was also dramatised for television by Donal Giltinan as 'The Suspect', one of 13 episodes in the 1966 BBC series drawn from Simenon's non-Maigret stories, Thirteen Against Fate with Marius Goring as Monsieur Hire. It was broadcast on BBC-1 on 4 September 1966.
