= Le Chat (film) =

1971 film

- Film poster
- Directed by: Pierre Granier-Deferre
- Written by: Pierre Granier-Deferre; Pascal Jardin
- Based on: The Cat by Georges Simenon
- Produced by: Raymond Danon; Maurice Jacquin
- Starring: Jean Gabin; Simone Signoret; Annie Cordy
- Cinematography: Walter Wottitz
- Edited by: Nino Baragli
- Music by: Philippe Sarde
- Distributed by: Valoria Films
- Release date: 24 April 1971
- Running time: 86 minutes
- Countries: France; Italy
- Language: French
- Box office: 1,035,709 ticket sales (France)

Le Chat ([lə ʃa], English: The Cat) is a 1971 French-language drama film directed by Pierre Granier-Deferre and based on Georges Simenon's 1967 novel The Cat.

== Plot ==
A cause of death of someone named Bouin is given as heart failure.

Julien Bouin is a retired typesetter who keeps copies of his work, mostly newspapers, in his basement. He has long since fallen out of love with his wife Clémence, a circus trapeze artist who had to stop working when she fell during a performance. Flashbacks show them courting and eventually moving into the home where they still live in Courbevoie, formerly a pretty suburb of Paris, now in decline and gradually being demolished. Further flashbacks show the events that led them to them no longer speaking at all but only communicating by passing notes.

Julien takes in a stray cat. It being the only one on whom he bestows his affection, the cat becomes the object of Clémence's annoyance and growing jealousy. She takes a knife and cuts up some of Julien's newspapers, telling him the cat is responsible. She tries to be rid of it for good by deliberately setting it among the fish at the local supermarket, but the cat turns up again. After a heated argument between the couple Julien goads Clémence into ending their conflict through killing herself with an old pistol which he leaves on the dining table in their living room. Clémence takes the pistol after he leaves and after a few failed attempts, shoots the cat dead.

Julien is so distraught at losing the cat that he leaves their home for some time, staying with Nelly, his former mistress who runs the local brothel. With Nelly, he expresses some concern that his wife may drink too much. She watches for him as he comes and goes.

When Julien finally returns, he declares that he will never speak to his wife again, and they begin to communicate only by passing notes, the rift between them now grown wider. When Clémence shows him the expropriation order on their home, the last one standing in the neighbourhood, he writes "JUST AS WELL." Soon, it, too will be demolished. Clémence keeps the notes as though she hopes to find in them their lost love, to no avail. One night, while doing so, she collapses and dies. Julien returns home and is shocked to find his wife dead. Julien takes an overdose of pills and goes to bed.

The first scene, indicating cause of death as heart failure, is shown once more.

== Cast ==
- Jean Gabin as Julien Bouin
- Simone Signoret as Clémence Bouin
- Annie Cordy as Nelly, owner of Hotel Floride
- Jacques Rispal as Le docteur / Doctor
- Nicole Desailly as L'infirmière / Nurse
- Harry-Max as Le retraité / Retiree
- André Rouyer as Le délégué / Delegate
- Carlo Nell as L'agent immobilier / Real-estate agent
- Yves Barsacq as L'architecte / Architect
- Florence Haguenauer as Germaine
- Renate Birgo as La crémière / Dairywoman
- Ermanno Casanova as Le patron du café / Café owner (as Ermano Casanova)
- Georges Mansart as Le garçon à la moto / Boy on a motorcycle
- Isabel del Río as La fille à la moto / Girl on a motorcycle

== Themes and analysis ==
Roger Ebert remarks how despite the couple's love having turned to hatred, the characters remain "so intimate they could almost read each other’s minds." The film is about how people "grow to depend on each other, and about how many varieties and disguises love comes in."

Tjebbe van Tijen remarks how the erosion and collapse of the couple's relationship is intermittently accompanied by images showing the demolition of the 19th-century Parisian suburb of Courbevoie to make way for La Défense, calling it "a classic example of a cinematic study in psycho-geography: the influence of the outer surroundings on the mind and the projection of inner feelings onto the landscape." Erick Maurel calls the neighbourhood a main character in its own right.

Adam Grassot highlights Julien's preoccupation with inevitability and decay due to the passing of time: when Clémence confronts Julien about their relationship, he says he no longer loves her, that he was "wrong" when he promised to love her "forever", and that he "grew old", casting the fading of his own feelings as something over which he has no control, like death, which will separate them "for good" sooner or later.

== Production ==
Le Chat is one of several films based on novels by Georges Simenon. Pierre Granier-Deferre wrote 15 episodes for a French TV series about Simenon's Inspector Maigret. The idea to adapt Simeon's 1966 novel was Pascal Jardin's, who scripted the director's previous film, La Horse.

In an interview that is featured on the StudioCanal DVD of the film, Granier-Deferre tells how the film producers had not wanted Simone Signoret, because her previous film, Jean-Pierre Melville's L'Armée des ombres, had been a box office failure, "and she was (most unjustly) being blamed for it." Eventually, it was Jean Gabin who intervened on his behalf, saying: "If Signoret is not in it, I don’t do the film." Signoret was cast six hours later.

Changes made to the source material by Jardin include: the ending, which is more tragic and inevitable; Clémence was originally a local property owner (bourgeoise), while Nelly ran a bistro where she likewise offered additional services to clients, including Julien. According to Maurel, neither the tone nor atmosphere is affected by these changes from the novel.

== Release ==
The film premiered in France on 24 April 1971. In Italy it was released in 1972, with the subtitle L'implacabile uomo di Saint Germain.

Other than at film festivals, Le Chat received no general release in the United States until its 8 June 1975 opening in New York City.

== Reception ==
=== Box office ===
Le Chat had a limited release in France, playing in four theatres, selling a total of 1,035,709 tickets.

=== Critical response ===
Roger Ebert gave the film 3½ stars out of 4, asserting that Simone Signoret "has aged into a solid, attractive middle-aged woman with the presence of a force of nature", while noting that the semi-retired Jean Gabin only took on roles if they were "right", and this role was right.

Vincent Canby of the New York Times called it a "curious, vivid, unusual film and, considering the subject matter, it's an unexpectedly entertaining one. It wouldn't be quite accurate to describe it as invigorating in any conventional sense of the word, but there is a good deal of excitement in watching these two marvelous professionals." In a retrospective review, Canby asserted that Le Chat is a cold-blooded film that "shatters but, in its perfection, it exalts."

Writing for the Los Angeles Free Press, Jacoba Atlas called Le Chat an "insightful, devastating look at the final ravishes of love", a "terrifying experience and difficult in the extreme", gaining much of its power from the "astonishing performances" of the leads: "two fine artists underplaying until pathos is captured in the smallest gesture, the quietest moment."

=== Accolades ===
Le Chat was nominated for a Golden Bear at the 21st Berlin International Film Festival. Signoret and Gabin won the Silver Bear for Best Actress and Best Actor respectively.
