= Panique (1946 film) =

1946 French film directed by Julien Duvivier

- Directed by: Julien Duvivier
- Screenplay by: Julien Duvivier; Charles Spaak
- Based on: Les Fiançailles de M. Hire by Georges Simenon
- Produced by: Pierre O'Connell
- Starring: Michel Simon; Viviane Romance
- Cinematography: Nicolas Hayer
- Edited by: Marthe Poncin
- Music by: Jean Wiener
- Production company: Filmsonor
- Distributed by: Les Acacias
- Release date: 19 December 1946 (Palais de Chaillot)
- Running time: 100 minutes
- Country: France

Panique, also released as Panic, is a 1946 French film directed by Julien Duvivier starring Michel Simon and Viviane Romance. The screenplay is based on the novel Les Fiançailles de M. Hire by Georges Simenon.

It was shot at the Victorine Studios in Nice, with sets designed by the art director Serge Piménoff.

In 1989 Patrice Leconte made a second film based on the same novel Monsieur Hire with Michel Blanc in the title role.

== Plot ==
Alice is a young woman who has just been released from prison after taking the rap for a robbery committed by her boyfriend Alfred. She arrives in town the night after a woman's murder. The next morning, Alice and Alfred pretend they are meeting for the first time, as the police know she covered up a crime for someone and are eager to discover the real criminal. Alice's neighbor, the eccentric and misanthropic loner Monsieur Hire, immediately falls for her. He warns her about Alfred, advising that she should ask him about the murder.

Although Alfred is not initially forthcoming, he admits to Alice that he is the murderer. He was sleeping with the woman and killed her for her money. When Alice tells him that Hire knows of his crime, he quickly sets a plan into action. He begins planting suspicions among the locals, who already dislike and distrust Hire. Meanwhile, Alice leads Hire on and plants the murdered woman's handbag in his apartment. Then Alfred tells his friends to gather Hire's neighbors, who search the apartment and find the handbag.

After his friends incite a violent mob, Alfred urges Alice to call Hire and beg him to leave work and return home. When he arrives and is confronted by the bloodthirsty crowd, Hire flees to the rooftops, where he slips. Despite the efforts of police and firefighters to save him, he falls to his death. Alfred and a regretful Alice slip away, thinking they have successfully framed Hire. However, the police examine Hire's body and discover a photograph of Alfred committing the murder. They wait to close in on Alfred as the movie ends.

== Cast ==
- Viviane Romance as Alice
- Michel Simon as M. Hire
- Max Dalban as Capoulade
- Émile Drain as M. Breteuil
- Guy Favières as M. Sauvage
- Florencie as Inspector Marcelin
- Charles Dorat as Inspector Michelet
- Lucas Gridoux as M. Fortin
- Marcel Pérès as Cermanutti
- Lita Recio as Marcelle

Other notable appearances include J.F. Martial as M. Joubet, Paul Bernard as Alfred, and Suzanne Desprès as La cartomancienne.

== Assessments ==
One study of French cinema places this film in its social and political context alongside other French films of the period:

[V]ery few postwar films attempted to explain why people collaborated. Far more narratives were spent on some kind of revenge. For example, Carné's Les Portes de la nuit (1946) was one of the few films about post-Resistance revenge. Others, however, were about individual vendettas not associated with the Resistance. The spurned and vengeful woman of Bresson's Dames au Bois de Boulogne (1946), the young suitor avenging the murder (by her lover) of the woman he has loved from a distance in Lacombe's Martin Roumagnac (1946), youth's revenge on being cheated by the war in Autant-Lara's Le Diable au corps (1946), the harrying of a Jew to his death in Duvivier's Panique (1946) and a number of Simenon and Steeman thriller adaptations rife with violence and revenge—all of these films attest to a need to project the immediate past on to a different set of narratives that are removed from the immediate arena of guilt (although Panique comes uncomfortably close).

In the years immediately following World War II, filmmakers were judged according to how their films reflected their implicit judgement of the behavior of the French under German occupation. The tale of "mob misrule" and "scapegoating" is played out in a setting that includes all the prototypical elements that identify it as a microcosm of French society: the cafe bar and terrace, small shops, church, modest hotel, "the selling of veal cutlets and Camembert". Panique has been described as "a strong and memorable screen denunciation of the relations between French people in the confused aftermath of the war" and "a harsh but thoughtfully delineated portrait of a society riven by mistrust and suspicion". Duvivier commented with respect to the film that "we are far from people who love each other". Defenders of French society responded that his years in exile during the war made him unfit to assess the French society that emerged from the war. Later critics have appreciated how the film makes references to the French Revolution as well as to the very recent past with playful puns and allusions rather than forthright statements, allowing the viewer to make the connections. In this analysis, self-censorship and the political context that made a careful examination of the recent past impossible forced Duvivier "to speak in more highly elaborated codes. It is the constraints themselves that produce a film compelling enough to demand an unraveling, and that distinguish Panique from the more journalistic renderings of Occupation stories that were made in later decades."

== Release ==
Panique had a gala premiere at Palais de Chaillot on December 19, 1946. It then opened in Paris on January 15, 1947. The film was described by film historian Lenny Borger as being a box office failure in France on its initial release. The film opened in New York on November 27, 1947.
