= The Man Who Watched the Trains Go By (novel) =

1938 novel by Georges Simenon

- Original French language title, L'Homme qui regardait passer les trains (1938)
- Author: Georges Simenon
- Original title: L'Homme qui regardait passer les trains
- Language: French; English
- Genre: Crime fiction
- Publication date: 1938
- Publication place: France
- Media type: Print (Hardback & Paperback)
- Pages: 210 pp (in 2006 Penguin edition)
- Preceded by: Tropic Moon
- Followed by: Liberty Bar

The Man Who Watched the Trains Go By (L'Homme qui regardait passer les trains), first published in French in 1938, is a crime thriller by Georges Simenon about a man's rapid descent into criminality and madness following sudden financial ruination. A film adaptation was released in 1952. It has been translated into English multiple times: by Stuart Gilbert (Routledge, 1942); by Marc Romano and D. Thin (New York Review Books, 2005); and by Siân Reynolds (Penguin, 2017).

== Plot summary ==
Kees Popinga, a quiet, respectable Dutchman working as head clerk in Groningen becomes increasingly unhinged after discovering that his cynical employer has looted and ruined his firm and confides in him that he will fake a suicide in order to escape punishment. Accepting a large sum of money from his erstwhile employer, Popinga sets out for Amsterdam, hoping to ingratiate himself with his employer's mistress, Pamela: but she mockingly laughs in his face, infuriating him. Popinga assaults her and accidentally kills her. He then hurriedly leaves town, eventually making his way to Paris. There, every day, he buys the various newspapers which carry the story of the murder. Although Chief Inspector Lucas of the Police Judiciare confidently predicts that Popinga will be arrested at any moment, Popinga successfully evades them. He begins sending letters to the police and to the newspapers, playing a sort of cat and mouse game. Soon the man becomes more and more delusional, seeing himself as a master criminal and certain that the woman he has become involved with, a prostitute named Jeanne Rozier, is genuinely interested in him, rather than in her pimp/boyfriend, Louis. For a time, Popinga joins Louis's gang of car thieves and hides out with them. But his reputation as a dangerous murderer wanted by the French police, frightens them, and he takes off on his own. He wanders the streets of Paris and its outskirts, staying in cheap hotels with prostitutes by night, until a pickpocket steals his wallet containing all the money he has left. Just as he is attempting suicide, he is captured by the French police. The French authorities send him back to Holland where he is put in a mental institution.

== Film adaptation ==
The book was adapted for the screen in 1952 as The Man Who Watched Trains Go By, starring Claude Rains and Märta Torén and directed by Harold French. The story was changed to make Kees Popinga into a more sympathetic character.
