= The Man Who Watched Trains Go By =

1952 crime drama film

- U.S. theatrical release poster
- Directed by: Harold French
- Screenplay by: Harold French; Paul Jarrico (originally uncredited)
- Based on: novel L'Homme qui regardait passer les trains by Georges Simenon
- Produced by: Josef Shaftel; Raymond Stross; David Berman (associate producer)
- Starring: Claude Rains; Marius Goring; Märta Torén
- Cinematography: Otto Heller
- Edited by: Vera Campbell; Arthur H. Nadel
- Music by: Benjamin Frankel
- Production companies: Raymond Stross Productions; Josef Shaftel Productions Inc.
- Distributed by: Eros Films (UK); MacDonald Pictures (US)
- Release dates: December 1952 (London, England)
- Running time: 82 minutes
- Country: England / United States
- Language: English
- Budget: $550,000

The Man Who Watched Trains Go By (U.S. title: The Paris Express) is a 1952 crime drama film directed by Harold French and starring Claude Rains, Marius Goring and Märta Torén. It was written by French and Paul Jarrico (uncredited due to blacklisting), based on the 1938 novel by Georges Simenon.

== Plot ==
In the Dutch city of Groningen, Kees Popinga has worked for 18 years as chief clerk and bookkeeper for a 300-year-old trading company, now run by Julius de Koster Jr. Kees's life is comfortable but stodgy. He loves trains, but has never travelled further than Amsterdam.

One day, a man named Merkemans, who had managed a company that went bankrupt because of another man's embezzlement, pleads with de Koster for a job. De Koster refuses because his own firm has too impeccable a reputation to be connected with such a scandal, and Merkemans had the responsibility to prevent the fraud. A French police inspector named Lucas then arrives to talk to de Koster about Dutch money that is turning up illegally in Paris. Lucas suspects the de Koster company, but de Koster invites Kees to show Lucas that the books are sound. That night, Kees happens to see de Koster kissing a woman goodbye at a station.

Lucas later questions Kees and de Koster about the woman, showing a picture. De Koster lies and Kees supports him, but now fears that he too has failed to prevent a crime. That night, his fears are confirmed when he goes to the office and finds de Koster burning the books. De Koster says that the firm will be bankrupt in the morning. Kees follows de Koster to a canal where De Koster shows him a suicide note. Kees is trying to stop him from jumping into the water when De Koster's briefcase comes open, revealing 100,000 Dutch guilders in cash. The suicide note was fake, and in a fit of rage, Kees attacks de Koster, who falls into the water and hits his head on a boat.

The briefcase also contains a train ticket to Paris and the address of the woman, whose name is Michele Rozier. Kees takes the briefcase and boards the train, abandoning his family. He is surprised to meet Lucas on board, who makes it clear he suspects Kees. As they approach Paris, Kees jumps off the train. He goes to Michele, but she turns him away, not realizing he has the money. Lucas meets her and explains what has happened. He says de Koster is alive, but Kees does not know this, and Lucas fears he will now do something desperate.

As Lucas hopes, Michele wants the money enough to trace Kees, and the police follow her to him. However, she helps him get away and stay with her lover, Louis, who lives over a garage near the train tracks. She tells Kees that within a couple of days, Louis will provide Kees with fake papers so he can leave the country.

Kees is suspicious enough to hide the money in an abandoned car close to the tracks, before Louis is able to search his effects. Bored with hiding and tired of belittling remarks about his status, he decides to "live dangerously" and takes Michele out to spend time with her. She seems attracted to him and he is seduced into trusting her. Drunk and infatuated, he phones Lucas to taunt him, promises Michele they will go away together, and then tells her where the money is. She goes there, but Lucas has already found it. He offers her immunity if she helps him find Kees.

Kees gets away from Lucas, steals a knife and goes to the garage. At knifepoint, Louis phones Michele and asks her to come. Kees confronts Michele and threatens to prove his worth by killing her—and then he does. With Lucas in pursuit, he runs onto the train tracks directly toward an approaching train. At the last moment, it reaches a switch and crosses onto another track. Kees rambles deliriously as Lucas arrests him.

== Cast ==
- Claude Rains as Kees Popinga
- Marius Goring as Lucas
- Märta Torén as Michele Rozier
- Ferdy Mayne as Louis
- Herbert Lom as Julius de Koster Jr
- Lucie Mannheim as Maria Popinga
- Anouk Aimée as Jeanne
- Eric Pohlmann as Goin
- Felix Aylmer as Mr Merkemans
- Gibb McLaughlin as Julius de Koster Sr
- Michael Nightingale as Popinga's clerk

== Critical reception ==
The Monthly Film Bulletin wrote: "This melodrama progresses slowly through a morass of superfluous dialogue and inconclusive climaxes. Claude Rains is deliciously miscast in the part of an ordinary little clerk who has never travelled; anyone less suited to the part is difficult to conceive. This initial mistake appears to have overwhelmed the picture from its first moments, and the result is a confused and unhappy piece of work. Iii."

Variety wrote: "A strong cast, pleasing color and an intriguing yarn are the major selling qualities of this new Anglo-American film. While it varies from the original Georges Simenon story, this keeps to essentially the same main character about whom the entire plot revolves. Pic has solid boxoffice potentialities for the home market and is strong enough to merit some wide popular showing in the U.S."

TV Guide wrote that the film "boasts good performances from Rains, Toren, and Lom, but is hampered by the static direction of Harold French".
