= The Clockmaker =

- Film poster
- Directed by: Bertrand Tavernier
- Written by: Georges Simenon (novel); Jean Aurenche; Pierre Bost; Bertrand Tavernier
- Produced by: Raymond Danon
- Starring: Philippe Noiret; Jean Rochefort
- Cinematography: Pierre-William Glenn
- Edited by: Armand Psenny
- Music by: Philippe Sarde
- Distributed by: Studio Canal
- Release date: 16 January 1974
- Running time: 105 minutes
- Country: France
- Language: French
- Box office: $7.4 million

The Clockmaker (French: L'Horloger de Saint-Paul, also known as The Clockmaker of St. Paul and The Watchmaker of St. Paul) is a 1974 French crime drama film directed by Bertrand Tavernier, his feature film debut. Based on the 1954 novel L'Horloger d'Everton by Georges Simenon, it tells the story of a widowed father who first discovers how little he knows about his teenage son, who kills a man and with his girl goes on the run, but then decides that whatever their faults he will stand by the pair.

The film was entered into the 24th Berlin International Film Festival where it won the Silver Bear - Special Jury Prize. In the United States, it was nominated for Best Foreign Language Film by the U.S. National Board of Review.

== Plot ==
Respected professionally and socially, the widowed watchmaker Michel Descombes lives peacefully over his shop in Lyons with his teenage son Bernard, who works in a factory. One morning when his son has not come home, which is not unusual, police arrive and take Michel to see their inspector, who gradually breaks the news that the boy has killed a man and fled with a girl called Liliane.

Michel knows nothing of the victim, an unpopular security guard at the factory, or of the girl, who worked there. In shock, he naively tells intrusive journalists whatever they want to hear. Once calmer, he realises he must be on his guard and when two thugs break his windows, he and his assistant beat them up, throwing one in the river. He visits the old woman who looked after Bernard when his mother died and discovers that she is closer to the boy than he is. The inspector, hoping that Michel may lead them to the runaway pair, puts a lot of effort into winning his confidence.

When the police do trace the two to a town in the north, he invites Michel to travel up with him. Arrested, the young people are flown back to Lyon for trial and Michel hires a lawyer, who has his own ideas on defence. It is alleged that the murdered man demanded sex from Liliane or he would frame her for stealing. The inspector also thinks the crime was not premeditated but the court is not convinced, giving Bernard 20 years for murder and Liliane 5 for abetting. Michel visits Bernard in prison to tell him that Liliane is pregnant and that he, with her parents, will look after the child. The two discuss possible names.

== Selected cast ==
- Philippe Noiret as Michel Descombes
- Jean Rochefort as Insp. Guilboud
- Jacques Denis as Antoine
- Yves Afonso as Insp. Bricard
- Julien Bertheau as Edouard
- Jacques Hilling as Costes
- Clotilde Joano as Janine Boitard
- Andrée Tainsy as Madeleine Fourmet
- William Sabatier as Lawyer
- Cécile Vassort as Martine
- Sylvain Rougerie as Bernard Descombes
- Christine Pascal as Liliane Torrini

== Reception ==
On review aggregator website Rotten Tomatoes, the film holds an approval rating of 100% based on 7 reviews, with an average rating of 8.2/10.
