= Pedigree (novel) =

1948 novel by Georges Simenon

- First edition
- Author: Georges Simenon
- Translator: Robert Baldick
- Language: French
- Publisher: Presses de la Cité
- Publication date: 1948
- English publication date: 1962
- Media type: Print
- Pages: 543 (NYRB)

Pedigree is an autobiographical novel by the Belgian author Georges Simenon, first published in 1948. Simenon described the work as "a book in which everything is true but nothing is accurate." It presents a fictionalised account of the author's childhood in Liège, Belgium, from the start of the twentieth century to the end of World War I.

An English translation by Robert Baldick was first published in the United Kingdom in 1962. Baldick's original translation was reissued by New York Review Books Classics in 2010 with an introduction by Lucy Sante.
