= Monsieur Hire =

- Theatrical release poster
- Directed by: Patrice Leconte
- Screenplay by: Patrice Leconte
- Based on: the novel Les Fiançailles de M. Hire by Georges Simenon
- Produced by: Philippe Carcassonne; René Cleitman
- Starring: Michel Blanc; Sandrine Bonnaire
- Cinematography: Denis Lenoir
- Edited by: Joëlle Hache
- Music by: Michael Nyman
- Distributed by: UGC Distribution
- Release date: 24 May 1989
- Running time: 81 minutes
- Country: France
- Language: French

Monsieur Hire (French pronunciation: [məsjø iʁ]) is a 1989 French mystery romantic thriller directed by Patrice Leconte and starring Michel Blanc in the title role and Sandrine Bonnaire as the object of Hire's affection. The film received numerous accolades as well as a glowing review from the American film critic Roger Ebert, who later added the film to his list of "Great Movies." The screenplay of the film is based on the novel Les Fiançailles de M. Hire by Georges Simenon and has original music by Michael Nyman. Simenon's novel was previously filmed in 1947 by Julien Duvivier as Panic (Panique) starring Michel Simon.

The film was entered in the 1989 Cannes Film Festival. It won the Prix Méliès from the French Syndicate of Cinema Critics and the award for Best Foreign Film at the 27th Guldbagge Awards.

== Plot ==
Hire (originally Hirovitch) is an isolated bachelor who works as a tailor, with no human contact outside his job beyond occasional visits to a brothel, a skating rink and a bowling alley. Though he talks to no-one and says he dislikes people, he observes them closely and in particular is struck by a young woman called Alice who moves into the building opposite and never closes her blinds. He spends his evenings secretly watching her, with more than just curiosity or lust because he has fallen in love with her.

One evening the dead body of a young woman is found nearby and, watching his neighbour, Hire sees her boyfriend Émile, a petty criminal, trying to wash blood off his raincoat and hiding a handbag. Hire says nothing to the police, because he wants to protect Alice, but then the police start investigating him, with the inspector trying to trick and intimidate him into confessing to murder.

While watching Alice one night from his darkened apartment, a flash of lightning reveals his staring face. Alice is at first horrified at being spied on and then is intrigued at who he can be. She engineers a meeting on the landing outside his flat, but he is too embarrassed to acknowledge her. Next evening she looks openly back at him and indicates that she is coming over. When she comes over, he rejects her advances. In the end, he agrees to meet her at the railway station restaurant, where he declares his love for her. He says he owns a small house in Switzerland to which the two of them could flee, which would separate her from the murderer Émile, with whose crime she is complicit, and get the police off Hire's back.

He buys two train tickets, giving one to Alice, and writes a letter to the police inspector denouncing Émile. At the station, Alice does not turn up, so he returns to his apartment. The inspector is there with Alice, who has placed the murdered woman's handbag among Hire's things for the inspector to find. Hire makes a break for it, but falls from the roof and is killed. Only later does the inspector read the letter and find Émile's bloodstained raincoat.

== Cast ==
- Michel Blanc – Monsieur Hire
- Sandrine Bonnaire – Alice
- Luc Thuillier – Emile
- André Wilms – Inspector

== Reception ==
A British reviewer from the 1989 Mystfest in Cattolica described the film as a "quiet adaptation of the Simenon novel... a coolly detached look at a man's sexual obsession which also managed to be poignantly affecting". The reviewer of Time Out commented that Leconte focussed on "the unexpectedly tender relationship that develops between watcher and watched", rather than the murder mystery, and manipulates "audience sympathies to create a poignant study of amour fou".

Monsieur Hire was one of the last films to have been added by film critic Roger Ebert to his Great Movies section, with Ebert calling Leconte "one of the most versatile of French directors." Review aggregation site Rotten Tomatoes also reports 100% approval for the film among 13 critics, with an average rating of 8.1/10. Rolling Stone said that Leconte "has made an unapologetically romantic film out of a grisly story", and called it "a spellbinder that digs into the darker recesses of the heart." Entertainment Weekly remarked that the plot "is involving in a conventional way, yet it isn’t tricky enough to work on the mystery-thriller level", but "Blanc’s sad, severe performance holds you, and Sandrine Bonnaire... makes the tenderest of femmes fatales."

Time Out found "Michel Blanc's playing of Hire especially intriguing in its cool, sensitive understatement. But it is Leconte's direction that steals the show", and noted that "subtlety rather than suspense, slowly but surely piecing together a jigsaw of brief elliptical scenes which mirror the nervy hesitancy of Hire's emotions" marked the directorial style, and his "narrative economy contrives to say a great deal about his hapless protagonist."

== Awards ==
- 1989: Prix Méliès
- 1990: César Award for Best Sound: Dominique Hennequin et Pierre Lenoir.
