= La Veuve Couderc =

Novel by Georges Simenon

La Veuve Couderc is a novel by Belgian writer Georges Simenon. It was first published in 1942. The novel was published at around the same time as Camus' The Stranger. Both novels contain a similar main character and themes, and Simenon was upset that Camus' work went on to greater acclaim.

The novel was republished as The Widow by NYRB Classics in 2009.
