= Presses de la Cité =

French publishing company

- Parent company: Editis
- Founded: 1943
- Founder: Sven Nielsen
- Country of origin: France
- Headquarters location: Paris
- Distribution: Interforum
- Imprints: Futurama; Futurama Superlights
- Official website: www.pressesdelacite.com

Presses de la Cité is a French publishing company founded in 1943 by Sven Nielsen, the son and grandson of booksellers, who came to Paris in 1924. Before becoming a publisher, Nielsen specialised in exporting French books.

In 1988, with its merger with Larousse-Nathan, Groupe de La Cité became the second-largest publishing company in France and the tenth-largest in the world. It was acquired by Havas and is now part of Editis.

== History ==
Having first specialised in translating American novels, Presses de la Cité first published home-produced work in 1946 with Je me souviens... by Georges Simenon, which became the first part of his novel Pedigree. At a rate of three or four books a year, Presses de la Cité published 140 of Simenon's novels and collections. Following Simenon's example, other French-language authors signed with the company, including Henri Queffélec, Cécil Saint-Laurent, Maurice Genevoix, René Barjavel, and Heinz G. Konsalik.

Starting in 1958, the company started on a stream of acquisitions:

- 1958: Purchase of Amiot-Dumont, founded in December 1946 as Le Livre Contemporain, which specialised in popular and travel books.
- 1959: Purchase of Éditions Perrin, academic publisher founded in 1884.
- 1961: Purchase of Éditions G.P., founded in 1945 as Générale de Publicité, which specialised in youth literature and was later renamed to G.P. Rouge et Or ('G.P. Red and Gold').
- 1961: Purchase of Éditions Solar, specialist in children's books and humour.

In 1962, Presses de la Cité started a paperback imprint called Presses-Pocket. The following year, this was merged with Fleuve Noir.

In April 1965, Nielsen bought a majority stake in Union Générale d'Éditions (UGE), founded in 1962, which included the imprints Plon, 10/18, Éditions du Rocher, Éditions Julliard and Jean-Jacques Pauvert, and the distributor Sequana. One of the publishers, Christian Bourgois, founded his own publishing house under the Presses de la Cité umbrella and, in 1968, was nominated director of 10/18. After these acquisitions, the Sven Nielsen group became the second-largest French publisher, after Hachette Livre. It diversified into publishing works on social sciences and for the youth market.

In April 1969, Nielsen and the Bertelsmann group formed a book club on the German model, called France Loisirs, which soon became a success.

In January 1971, the company was reorganised, with distribution by Les Presses de la Cité Diffusion (for Presses de la Cité, G.P. Rouge et Or and Presses-Pocket) and Nouvelle Société Sequana (for Plon, Perrin, Julliard, Solar, 10/18, Bourgois et Le Rocher).

In 1973, the companies Presses de la Cité, Diffusion and Sequana were merged under the name Messageries du Livre.

Nielsen died on 30 December 1976, aged 75. His son Claude succeeded him, and sold some parts of the company to the investment bank Generale Occidentale, which provided capital to purchase Garnier and Bordas-Dunod.

In 1986, the company was bought by James Goldsmith's holding company Generale Occidentale, who sold Generale Occidentale to Ambroise Roux's Compagnie Générale d'Electricité (CGE) the following year. In 1988, Generale Occidentale merged Presses de la Cité with Havas S.A. subsidiary CEP Communications to create Groupe de la Cité (GDC), which became the second largest publisher after Hachette. In 1988, GDC acquired the British children's publisher Kingfisher. In 1989, GDC acquired the French legal publisher Dalloz and the British reference publisher Chambers. They also launched the American publisher Millbrook Press. In 1990, GDC acquired Éditions Robert Laffont. In 1992, GDC acquired British publisher Harraps. GDC sold Millbrook in 1994.

CEP acquired almost complete control of the Groupe in 1995. With 7 billion French francs of assets, it became, in 1996, the largest publisher in France. Havas acquired full ownership of CEP in 1997 and in 1998, Havas was acquired by the company that became Vivendi. Presses de la Cité became part of Vivendi Universal Publishing (VUP) in 2000 and then Editis, which was acquired by Wendel in 2004. In 2008, Wendel sold Editis to the Spanish Grupo Planeta. In 2019, Vivendi acquired Editis from Planeta. In 2023, Czech Media Invest, which is owned by Czech billionaire Daniel Křetínský acquired Editis from Vivendi.
