= Georges Simenon =

Belgian writer (1903–1989)

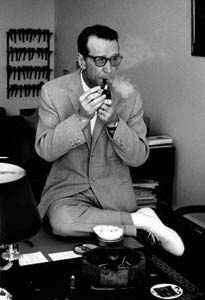
- Simenon in 1963
- Born: Georges Joseph Christian Simenon; 12 February 1903 (or 13 February 1903); Liège, Wallonia, Belgium
- Died: 4 September 1989 (aged 86); Lausanne, Romandy, Switzerland
- Education: Collège Saint-Louis, Liège
- Occupation: Novelist
- Writing career
- Pen name: G. Sim, Monsieur Le Coq
- Language: French
- Years active: 1919–1981
- Notable awards: Académie royale de Belgique (1952)

Georges Joseph Christian Simenon (French: [ʒɔʁʒ simnɔ̃]; 12/13 February 1903 – 4 September 1989) was a Belgian writer who created the fictional detective Jules Maigret. One of the most prolific and successful authors of the 20th century, he published around 400 novels (including 192 under his own name), 21 volumes of memoirs and many short stories, selling over 500 million copies.

Apart from his detective fiction, he achieved critical acclaim for his literary novels, which he called romans durs (hard novels). Among his literary admirers were Max Jacob, François Mauriac and André Gide. Gide wrote, "I consider Simenon a great novelist, perhaps the greatest, and the most genuine novelist that we have had in contemporary French literature."

Born and raised in Liège, Belgium, Simenon lived for extended periods in France (1922–1945), the United States (1946–1955) and finally Switzerland (1957–1989). Much of his work is semi-autobiographical, inspired by his childhood and youth in Liège, extensive travels in Europe and the world, wartime experiences, troubled marriages, and numerous love affairs.

Critics such as John Banville have praised Simenon's novels for their psychological insights and vivid evocation of time and place. Among his most notable works are The Saint-Fiacre Affair (1932), Monsieur Hire's Engagement (1933), Act of Passion (1947), The Snow Was Dirty (1948) and The Cat (1967).

== Early life and education ==
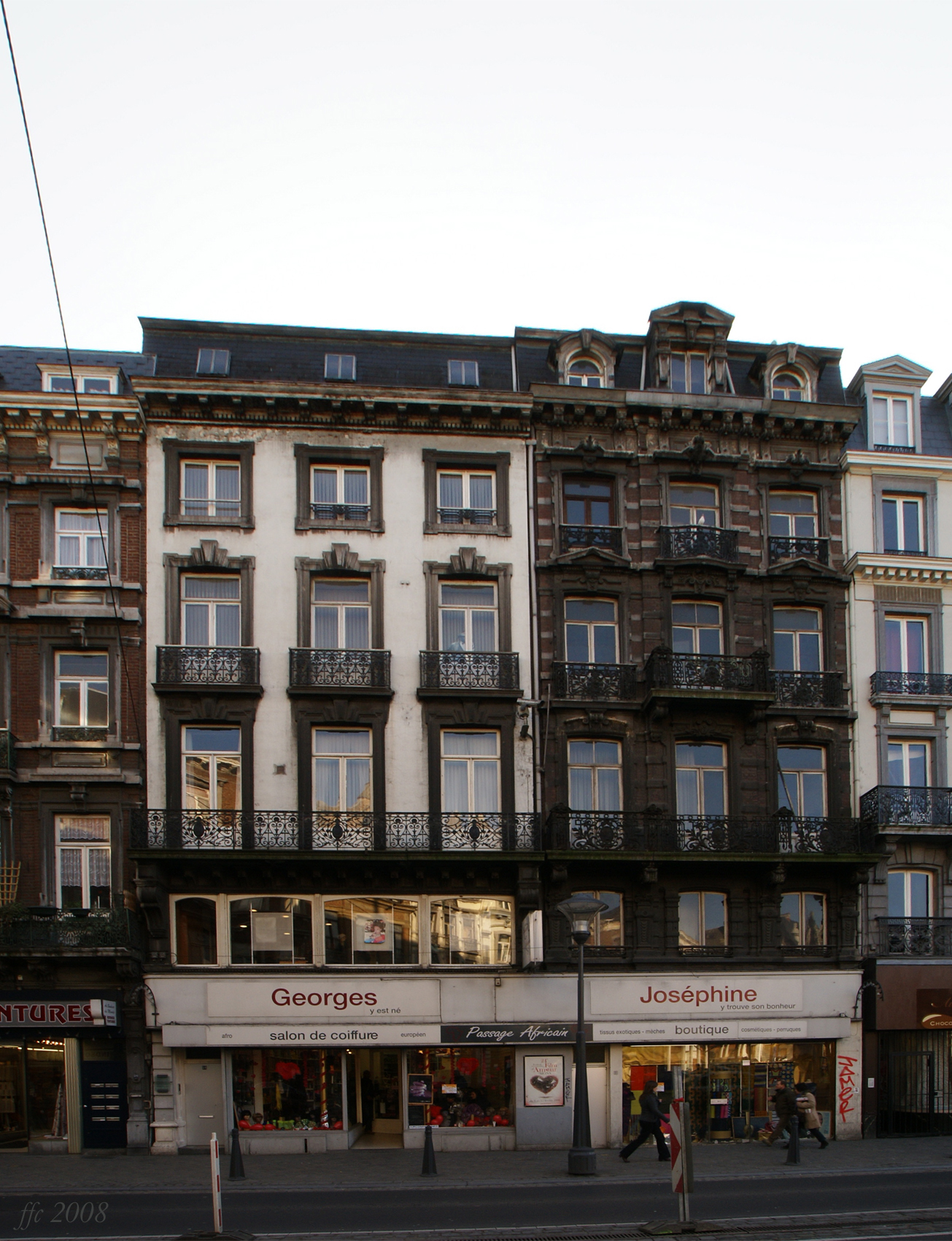
26 rue Léopold, Liège, the house where Simenon was born

Simenon was born at 26 Rue Léopold (Liège) (now number 24) to Désiré Simenon and Henriette Brüll. Désiré Simenon worked in an accounting office at an insurance company and had married Henriette in April 1902. Simenon was born either at 11.30 pm on Thursday 12 February 1903 (according to the birth certificate) or just after midnight on Friday 13th (the date possibly being falsified on the certificate due to superstition).

The Simenon family was of Walloon and Flemish ancestry, settling in the Belgian Limburg in the seventeenth century. His mother's family was of Flemish, Dutch and German descent. One of his mother's most notorious ancestors was Gabriel Brühl, a criminal who preyed on Limburg from the 1720s until he was hanged in 1743. Later Simenon would use Brühl as one of his many pen names.

In April 1905, two years after Simenon's birth, the family moved to 3 rue Pasteur (now 25 rue Georges Simenon) in Liège's Outremeuse neighbourhood. Simenon's brother Christian was born in September 1906 and eventually became their mother's favourite child, which Simenon resented. The young Simenon, however, idolised his father and later claimed to have partly modelled Maigret's temperament on him.

At the age of three, Simenon learned to read at the Ecole Guardienne run by the Sisters of Notre Dame. Then, between 1908 and 1914, he attended the Institut Saint-André, run by the Christian Brothers.

In 1911 the Simenons moved to 53 rue de la Loi, where they took in lodgers, many of them students from Eastern Europe, Jews and political refugees. This gave the young Simenon an introduction to the wider world, which was later reflected his novels, notably Pedigree (published 1948) and Le Locataire (The Lodger) (1938).

Following the outbreak of the First World War in August 1914, Liège was occupied by the German army. Henriette took in German officers as lodgers, much to Désiré's disapproval. Simenon later said that the war years provided some of the happiest times of his life. They were also memorable for a child because "my father cheated, my mother cheated, everyone cheated."

In October 1914 Simenon began his studies at the Collège Saint-Louis, a Jesuit high school. After a year he switched to Collège St Servais, where he studied for three years. He excelled at French, but his marks in other subjects declined. He read widely in the Russian, French and English classics, frequently played truant, and turned to petty theft in order to buy pastries and other war-time luxuries.

In 1917 the Simenon family moved to a former post-office building in the rue des Maraîchers. Using his father's heart condition as a pretext, Simenon left school in June 1918 without taking his end-of-year exams. After brief periods working in a pâtisserie and a bookshop, Simenon found himself unemployed when the war ended in November 1918. He witnessed scenes of violent retribution against residents of Liège accused of collaboration, which stayed with him for the rest of his life. He described these scenes in Pedigree and Les trois crimes de mes amis (My Friends' Three Crimes) (1938).

== Early career, 1919–1922 ==
In January 1919 the 15-year-old Simenon took a job as a junior reporter at the Gazette de Liège, a right-wing Catholic newspaper edited by Joseph Demarteau. Within a few months he was promoted to crime reporting, signing his articles "Georges Sim". By April he was given his own opinion and gossip column, which he signed "Monsieur Le Coq". He was also assigned interviews with leading international figures such as Hirohito, Crown Prince of Japan, and French war hero Marshal Foch. In 1920-21 he enrolled on a course in forensic science at the University of Liège in order to improve his knowledge of the latest police methods.

In May 1920 Simenon began publishing short fiction in the Gazette. In September he completed his first novel, Au Pont des Arches, which he self-published in 1921. He wrote two other novels while working at the Gazette, but these were never published.

In June 1919 Simenon had been introduced into a group of young artists and bohemians that called itself "La Caque" (herring barrel). The group met at night to drink, discuss art and philosophy, and experiment with drugs such as morphine and cocaine. In early 1922 one of the members of the group, Joseph Kleine, hanged himself at the doors of the St Pholien church of Liège after a night of excess with La Caque. Simenon was one of the last people to see Kleine alive and was deeply affected by his suicide, later referring to the incident in Les trois crimes de mes amis and Le pendu de St Pholien (The Hanged Man of Saint Pholien) (1931).

Through La Caque, Simenon met a young painter, Régine Renchon, and in early 1921 they began a relationship. They soon became engaged and agreed that Simenon should complete his year of compulsory military service before they married.

Simenon's father died in November 1921, an event that Simenon called "the most important day in a man's life." Soon after, he began his military service. After a brief posting with the allied occupation forces in Germany, he was transferred to the cavalry barracks in Liège and was soon given permission to resume writing for the Gazette.

When Simenon's military service ended in December 1922, he resigned from the Gazette and moved to Paris to establish a base for himself and his future wife, Régine, whom he preferred to call Tigy.

== France, 1922–1945 ==
=== Literary apprenticeship, 1922–1928 ===
Now in Paris, Simenon found a menial job with a far-right political group headed by the writer Binet-Valmer. In March 1923 he returned to Liège to marry Régine. Although neither Simenon nor Régine were religious, they were married in a Catholic church to please Simenon's mother, who was devout.

The newly-weds moved to Paris where Régine tried to establish herself as a painter while Simenon resumed work for Binet-Valmer and sent articles to the Revue Sincère of Brussels for which he was the Paris correspondent. He also wrote short stories for popular magazines, but sales were sporadic.

In the summer of 1923, Simenon was engaged by the Marquis de Tracy as his private secretary, which obliged him to spend nine months of the year at the aristocrat's various rural properties. Régine soon moved to a village near the Marquis's principal estate at Paray-le-Frésil, near Moulins.

While working for the Marquis, Simenon began submitting stories to Le Matin whose literary editor was Colette. Colette advised him to make his work "less literary" which Simenon took to mean that he should use simple descriptions and a limited stock of common words. Simenon followed her advice and within a year became one of the paper's regular contributors.

Now with a steady income from his writing, Simenon left the Marquis' employ in 1924 and returned to Paris where he and Régine found an apartment in the fashionable Place des Vosges. Simenon was writing and selling short stories at the rate of 80 typed pages a day, and now turned his hand to pulp novels. His first, Le roman d'une dactylo (The Story of a Typist) was quickly sold and two more appeared in 1924 under the pseudonyms "Jean du Perry" and "Georges Simm". From 1921 to 1934 he wrote 358 novels and short stories under 17 pen names.

In the summer of 1925, the Simenons took a holiday in Normandy where they met Henriette Liberge, the 18-year-old daughter of a fisherman. Régine offered her a job as their housekeeper in Paris and the young woman accepted. Simenon began calling her "Boule", and she was to become his lover and part of the Simenon household under that name for the next 39 years.

Simenon began an affair with Josephine Baker in 1926 or 1927, and became her part-time assistant and editor of Josephine Baker's Magazine. However, the Simenons were tiring of their hectic life in Paris, and in April 1928 they set out with Boule for a six-month tour of the rivers and canals of France in a small boat, the Ginette. Without the distractions provided by Josephine Baker, Simenon's tally of published popular novels increased from 11 in 1927 to 44 in 1928.

=== Birth and retirement of Maigret, 1929–1939 ===
In the spring of 1929, the Simenons and Boule set off for a tour of northern France, Belgium and Holland in a larger, custom-built boat, the Ostrogoth. Simenon had begun contributing detective stories to a new magazine called Détective and continued to publish popular novels, mainly with the publishers Fayard.

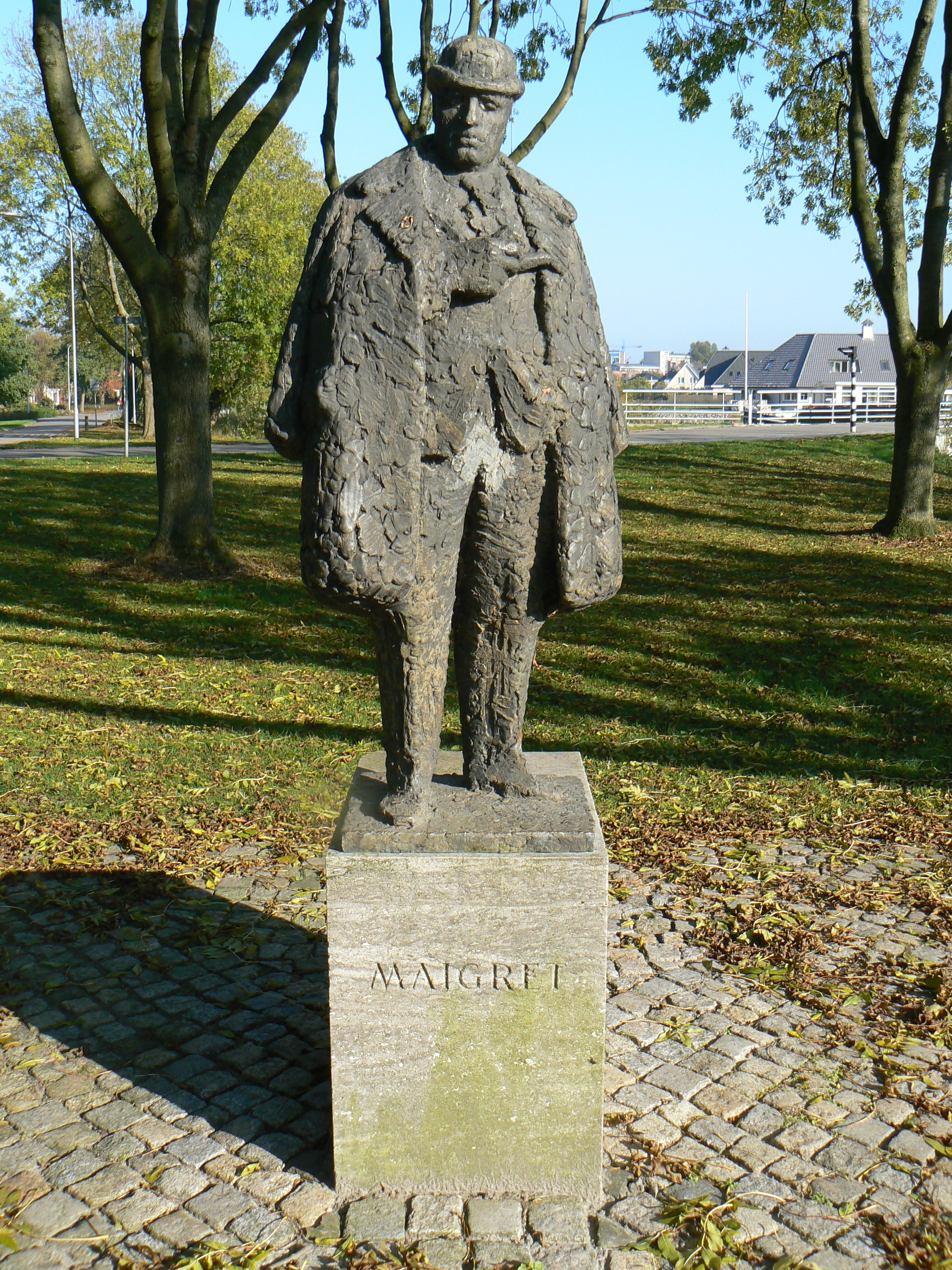
Maigret statue in Delfzijl, Netherlands

During his northern tour, Simenon wrote three popular novels featuring a police inspector named Maigret, but only one, Train de nuit (Night Train) was accepted by Fayard. Simenon began working on the latter novel (or possibly its successor Pietr-le-Letton (Pietr the Latvian)) in September 1929 when the Ostrogoth was undergoing repairs in the Dutch city of Delfzijl.

On his return to Paris in April 1930, Simenon completed Pietr-le-Letton, the first novel in which inspector Maigret of the Paris mobile crime brigade was a fully developed character. The novel was serialised in Fayard's magazine Ric et Rac later that year, and was the first fictional work to appear under Simenon's real name.

The first Maigret novels were launched in book form by Fayard in February 1931 at the fancy dress bal anthropométrique which had a police and criminals theme. The launching party was widely reported and the novels received positive reviews. Simenon wrote 19 Maigret novels by the end of 1933, and the series eventually sold 500 million copies.

In April 1932, the Simenons and Boule moved to La Rochelle on the west coast of France. Soon after, they left for Africa where Simenon visited his brother, who was a colonial administrator in the Belgian Congo. Simenon also visited other African colonies and wrote a series of articles highly critical of colonialism. He drew on his African experience in novels such as Le Coup de lune (Tropic Moon) (1933) and 45^{0} à l'ombre (Aboard the Aquitaine) (1936).

In 1933, the Simenons visited Germany and Eastern Europe, and Simenon secured an interview with Leon Trotsky in exile in Turkey for Paris-Soir. On his return, he announced that he would write no more Maigret novels, and signed a contract with the prestigious publisher Gallimard for his new work.

Maigret, written in June 1933 or February 1934, was intended to be the last of the series and ended with the detective in retirement. Simenon called the Maigret novels "semi-literary" and he wanted to establish himself as a serious writer. He stated his aim was to win the Nobel Prize for Literature by 1947.

Simenon's notable novels of the 1930s, written after the temporary retirement of Maigret, include Le testament Donadieu (The Shadow Falls) (1937), L'homme qui regardait passer les trains (The Man Who Watched the Trains Go by) (1938) and Le bourgmestre de Furnes (The Burgomaster of Furnes) (1939). André Gide and François Mauriac were among Simenon's greatest literary admirers at the time.

In 1935, the Simenons undertook a world tour which included the Americas, the Galapagos Islands, Tahiti, Australia and India. They then moved back to Paris, to the fashionable Neuilly district, where they lived a life of luxury that Simenon later described as "too sumptuous."

Simenon began writing short stories featuring Inspector Maigret in 1936, as the insistence of his publisher. In 1938 he returned to La Rochelle to live because, as Simenon later explained, "I was sickened by the life I was leading." In April the following year Simenon's first child, Marc, was born.

=== Second World War, 1939–1945 ===
Simenon was in a café in La Rochelle when France declared war on Germany on 3 September 1939. In May 1940, Germany invaded Belgium, and La Rochelle became the reception centre for Belgian refugees. The Belgian government appointed Simenon Commissioner for Refugees, and he organised the reception, accommodation, and food and health needs for some 55,000 war refugees before the armistice of 22 June. By August, all Belgian refugees had been repatriated and Simenon resumed civilian life in his new home at Fontenay-le-Comte in the Vendée.

Later in 1940, a local doctor examined Simenon and diagnosed a serious heart illness, advising him to cut back on his favourite pastimes of pipe smoking, excessive eating, alcohol, and sex. Simenon began working on his memoirs Je me souviens (I Remember), intended as a letter to his son from a father who would soon be dead. A second medical opinion was later sought, and Simenon was assured his heart was sound.

Simenon returned to writing Maigret novels, completing two in 1940 and three in 1941. He also wrote longer novels such as Pedigree, a fictionalised reworking of Je me souviens. As a popular, non-Jewish author who avoided war themes and anti-German sentiments, Simenon had few problems in having his works published at a time of censorship and paper restrictions.

Among his major works written during the war years are La veuve Couderc (The Widow Couderc) (1942), Le fuite de M. Monde (Monsieur Monde Vanishes) (published 1945), and Pedigree (published 1948). Simenon also conducted correspondence, most notably with André Gide. Gide considered La veuve Couderc superior to Camus' The Stranger which was published around the same time and has a similar main character and themes.

During the war, Simenon sold the film rights to five of his novels to Continental Films, which was funded by the German government and banned the participation of Jews. The Continental production of Simenon's Les inconnus dans la maison (Strangers in the House) had exaggerated anti-Semitic themes which are not in the novel. Resistance underground newspapers began attacking Continental Films and anyone who took their money.

In 1942, the French Commissariat-Géneral aux Questions Juives notified Simenon that they suspected him of being Jewish and gave him one month to prove he was not. Simenon was able to obtain the necessary certificates of birth and baptism through his mother, and soon after the Simenons moved to a more remote village in the Vendée.

In 1944, Régine discovered Simenon's long-term affair with Boule, and Simenon also confessed to his numerous other affairs. The couple agreed to remain married for the sake of their child, but to give each other their sexual freedom.

In November 1944, following the German retreat, Simenon, Marc and Boule moved to a hotel in the resort town of Les Sables d'Olonne, while Régine returned to their house near La Rochelle which had now been evacuated by the Germans. In January 1945, Simenon was placed under house arrest by the police and the French Forces of the Interior on suspicion of collaboration. After three months of investigations, he was cleared of all charges.

Simenon went to Paris in May 1945 while Marc and Boule returned to their house near La Rochelle with Régine. Simenon, possibly out of concern that the French Communist Party might take over France, had decided to move to America. The rest of the family soon joined him in Paris and Simenon used his contacts to secure the required travel documents for America. Régine, however, refused to travel to America with Marc unless Boule stayed behind in France. Simenon reluctantly agreed to Régine's demand.

== United States and Canada, 1945–1955 ==
The Simenons arrived in New York in October 1945 and soon moved to Canada, where they set up home at Sainte-Marguerite-du-Lac-Masson, Quebec, north of Montreal. In November, Simenon met Denyse Ouimet, a 25-year-old French-Canadian, with whom he started an affair and hired as his secretary. Denyse moved into the Simenon home in January 1946, and several weeks later told Régine that she was his new lover. Simenon fictionalised his affair with Denyse in his novels Trois chambres à Manhattan (Three Bedrooms in Manhattan) (1947) and Lettre à mon juge (Act of Passion) (1947).

The Simenons and Denyse drove to Florida in the summer of 1946, and then visited Cuba in order to arrange for permanent residence visas for the United States. It was in Florida that Simenon wrote Lettre à mon juge, widely considered one of his major works.

In June 1947, the Simenons moved to Arizona. Boule joined them there in 1948, after Régine dropped her objections to Simenon's desire to have a wife and two lovers in his household. Simenon continued to write quickly, working from 6 am to 9 am daily, and averaging 4,500 words a day. While in Arizona, Simenon wrote two Maigret novels and several romans durs (hard novels) including La neige était sale (The Snow Was Dirty) (1948), one of his major works. The 1951 American paperback edition of this novel sold 2 million copies.

Denyse became pregnant in early 1949, and Simenon asked Régine for a divorce. Denyse gave birth to Jean Dennis Chrétien Simenon (known as John) on 29 September. Régine had moved to California with Marc and Boule, and Simenon, Denyse and the baby soon moved to Carmel-by-the-Sea where they would be close to Marc. The divorce was granted in Nevada on 21 June 1950. Simenon married Denyse the following day.

The newly-weds moved to Lakeville, Connecticut and also rented a house in nearby Salmon Creek for Régine, Marc and Boule. In the five years he lived in Connecticut, Simenon wrote 13 Maigret novels and 14 romans durs including the major works La mort de Belle (Belle) (1952) and L'horloger d'Everton (The Watchmaker of Everton) (1954).

While living in Connecticut, Simenon's book sales increased to an estimated 3 million a year, and he was elected president of the Mystery Writers of America. Simenon and Denyse made two trips to Europe, in 1952 and 1954. On the 1952 trip, Simenon was admitted to the Royal Belgian Academy. In February 1953, Denyse gave birth to a daughter, Marie-Georges Simenon (known as Marie-Jo). By this time, Boule had moved in with Denyse and Simenon and had resumed her position as his lover.

By 1955, Simenon had become disillusioned with America and concerned that Denyse, who wanted to live in Europe, was becoming more distant from him. In March, Simenon, Denyse and Boule left for a European holiday and were never to return to live in America.

== Return to Europe, 1955–1989 ==
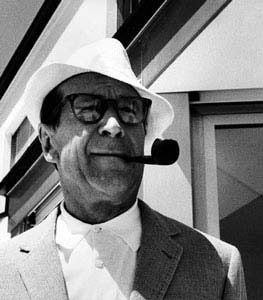
Simenon, 1963 by Erling Mandelmann

The Simenons took up residence in France at Mougins, near Cannes, while Régine and Marc lived in a hotel nearby. Simenon wrote two Maigret novels and two romans durs during his first six months on the French Riviera, but was still searching for a permanent home. In July 1957, the Simenons and Boule moved to the Château d'Echandens near Lausanne, Switzerland, and were to remain there for seven years.

In May 1959, Denyse gave birth to a son, Pierre, who soon became seriously ill but survived a difficult first year. In December 1961, Simenon and Denyse employed Teresa Sburelin, a young Italian woman, as a maid. Teresa soon became Simenon's lover and was to remain his companion for the rest of his life.

Simenon continued to produce novels at a rate of three to five a year at Enchandens, including two of his most notable, Le président (The Premier) (1958) and Les anneaux de Bicêtre (The Patient) (1963).

However, the relationship between Denyse and Simenon was deteriorating. They were both drinking heavily and Simenon admitted that he had hit her. In June 1962 Denyse was persuaded to admit herself to a mental health clinic for several months. In 1961 the Simenons had decided to build a new house at Epalinges in the heights above Lausanne. The house was completed in December 1963, but Denyse lived there for only a few months before returning to the clinic.

Denyse left Epalinges for the last time in April 1964. In November Simenon dismissed Boule, who went to live with Marc, who was now married with children.

Although Simenon never divorced Denyse, he was now living with his companion, Teresa, and three of his children: John, Marie-Jo, and Pierre. He continued to work steadily, completing three to four books a year from 1965 to 1971, including the important works Le petit saint (The Little Saint) (1965) and Le chat (The Cat) (1967).

In February 1973 Simenon announced that he was retiring from writing. A few months later he and Teresa moved into a small house in Lausanne. He produced no new fiction from that date, but he dictated 21 volumes of memoirs.

In May 1978 Simenon's daughter, Marie-Jo, killed herself in Paris at the age of 25. In his final volume of memoirs, Mémoires intimes (Intimate memoirs) (1981), he wrote, "One never recovers from the loss of a daughter one has cherished. It leaves a void that nothing can fill."

Simenon underwent a brain operation in 1984 but made a full recovery. From late 1988 he used a wheelchair. He died on 4 September 1989, following a fall.

== Works and critical reception ==
Simenon's published works include 192 novels written under his own name, over 200 novels written under various pseudonyms, four autobiographies and 21 volumes of memoirs. He also wrote a large quantity of short fiction. His novels had sold over 500 million copies by the time of his death, making him one of the highest selling novelists in history. In 2008, The Times named Simenon the second greatest crime writer of all time after Patricia Highsmith.

Simenon's fiction is often classified into his early pseudonymous popular novels, the last of which was written in 1933; his fiction featuring Detective Chief Inspector Jules Maigret (75 novels and 28 short stories); and his 117 literary novels which he called romans durs ("hard novels").

=== Maigret novels ===
The first Maigret novel published under Simenon's name was Pietr-le-Letton (Pietr the Latvian) which was serialised in 1930. The last Maigret novel was Maigret et M. Charles (Maigret and Monsieur Charles) published in 1972.

The early Maigret novels generally received positive reviews and were acknowledged as an attempt to raise the standard of the French crime novel. Several critics, however, made fun of the speed with which they were written. Le Canard Enchaîné told its readers, "Monsieur Georges Simenon makes his living by killing someone every month and then discovering the murderer."

The 100 Years of Georges Simenon coin

The Maigret stories are short and characterised by their simple writing style and a deliberately restricted vocabulary (which Simenon estimated was limited to 2000 words). Simenon stated that his Maigret novels were designed to be read by people of average education in a single sitting.

Patrick Marnham, Scott Bradfield and others state that the early Maigrets were innovative because the detective doesn't hunt for clues or use deduction to find the guilty party, but rather immerses himself in the life and environment of the victim and suspected criminal. In most cases, Maigret seeks to understand the criminal rather than judge him.

Simenon stated that his Maigret stories often deal with more serious themes than those of his other novels. Recurrent themes include political influence over the justice system, snobbery and class divisions, and the role of social background and pure chance in determining whether an individual becomes a criminal or a respected member of society.

Marnham, Fenton Besler and others have pointed out that the plots of the Maigret novels are often implausible and internally inconsistent. However critics have praised Simenon's ability to evoke concisely the atmosphere of a particular place and to provide insights into human psychology. Referring to The Saint-Fiacre Affair, John Banville wrote, "The story is silly, as usual, but the evocation of the little town and its people makes such considerations irrelevant."

=== Romans durs ("hard novels") ===
Simenon suspended his writing of Maigret stories in 1933 in order to concentrate on the literary novels he called romans durs. In 1937 he stated that his aim was to win the Nobel Prize for Literature in 1947.

Simenon defined the novel as, "a passion which completely possesses and enslaves the writer and permits him to exorcise his demons by giving them form and casting them out into the world." His novels were about "the naked man, the one who looks at himself in the mirror while shaving and has no illusions about himself."

Michel Lemoine has elaborated on this, stating, "There is hardly a character in all the Simenon canon who does not ask, 'Who am I? What have I done with my life?"

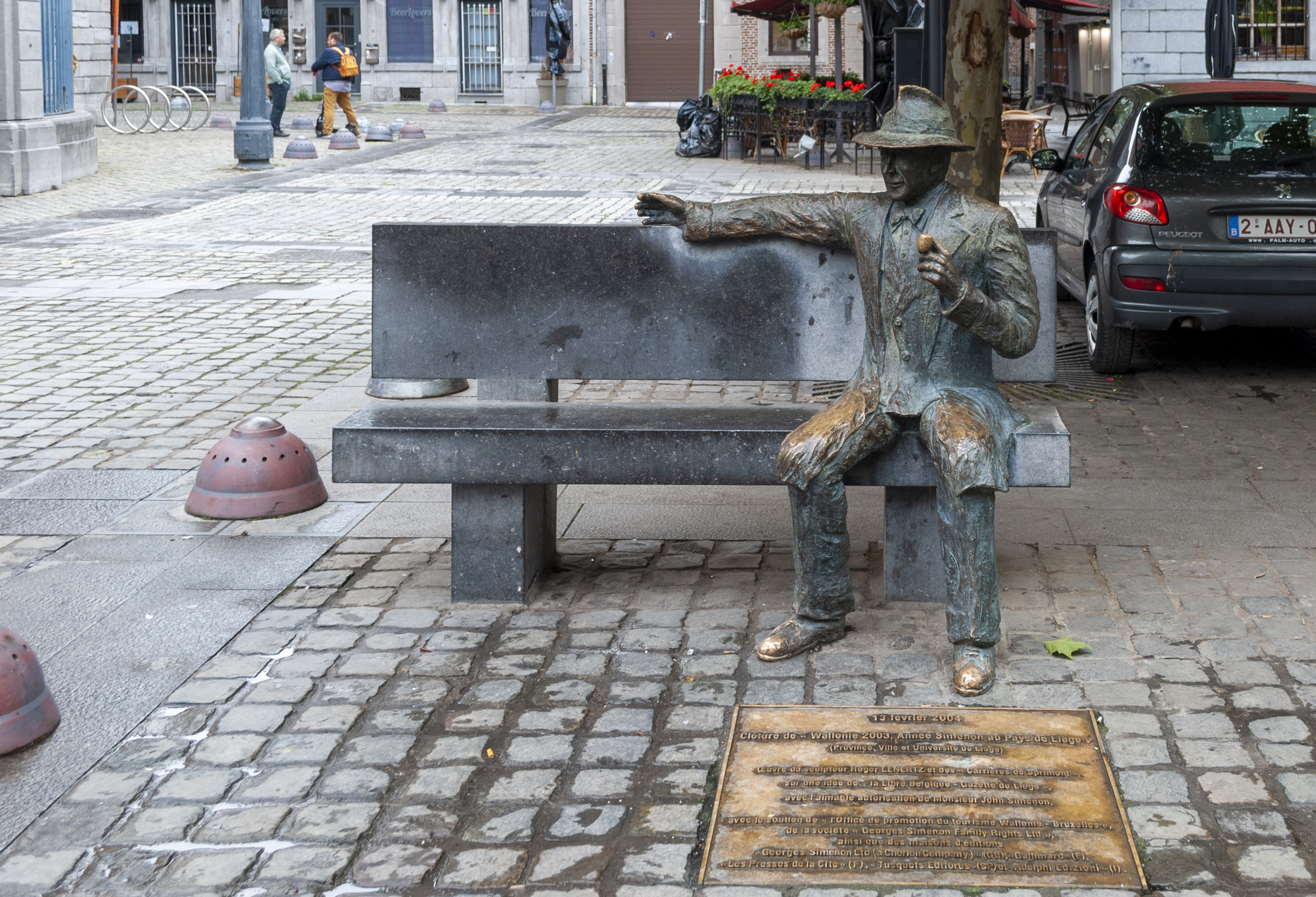
Bench and sculpture dedicated to Simenon in his home city of Liège

Biographer Fenton Besler described the roman durs as "psychological thrillers...in which he explores the darkest corners of the human mind and, in tautly written prose, creates an atmosphere which is sinister and entirely his own." According to Besler, it doesn't matter whether Simenon's novels are set in France, Africa, Tahiti or America, the characters live the same traumas and despair, only "with their problems and anxieties accentuated by the local setting."

Biographer Patrick Marnham states that Simenon's earliest romans durs contain many of Simenon's typical themes: the street life of Paris, prostitution, the drudgery of domestic servants and shop assistants, police corruption and the hope of escape represented by railway stations. He compares Simenon's preoccupation with the "little people" with that of Balzac. According to Marnham, there is also a strong autobiographical strain in his fiction, where events which Simenon had experienced were lightly fictionalised and then taken to a social, criminal or psychological extreme.

Simenon's romans durs soon gained a high reputation among other writers, with Max Jacob, François Mauriac and André Gide among his admirers. Nevertheless, the academic and critical reception of his novels in France and the United States was mixed, which Ralph Ingersoll, Brendan Gill and Gilbert Sigaux have attributed to suspicion about their popularity and the speed with which they were written.

Simenon's most acclaimed novels include Monsieur Hire's Engagement (1933), The Man who Watched the Trains Go By (1938), Monsieur Monde Vanishes (1945), Act of Passion (1947), The Snow was Dirty (1948), Red Lights (1953), and The Little Saint (1967).

== Honours and legacy ==
- President of the Mystery Writers of America (1952)
- Member of Royal Academy of French Language and Literature of Belgium (1952)
- Chevalier de la Légion d'honneur (1955)
- Honorary Member of American Academy of Arts and Letters (1971)

In 2003, the collection La Pléiade published 21 of Simenon's novels in two volumes. The novels were selected by Professor Jacques Dubois, President of the Centre for Georges Simenon Studies at the Université de Liège, and his assistant Benoît Denis, both experts on Simenon. A third volume of eight novels and two autobiographical works was published in 2009.

== Selected works ==
The following works were selected for inclusion in the Pléiade editions of the works of Georges Simenon. The French title and year of first publication in France is given first, followed by the titles of major English translations published in book form. Unless otherwise specified, the sources for the French title and publication date are Bernard Alavoine, Tout Simenon and Tout Maigret. The sources for the titles of English translations are Trudee Young, Barry Forshaw, Patrick Marnham and Penguin UK.

- Le Charretier de la 'Providence' (1931) (The Crime at Lock 14; Maigret Meets a Milord; Lock 14; The Carter of 'La Providence')
- L'Affaire Saint-Fiacre (1932) (The Saint-Fiacre Affair; Maigret Goes Home)
- Les Fiançailles de M. Hire (1933) (The Engagement; Monsieur Hire's Engagement)
- Le Coup de lune (1933) (Tropic Moon)
- La Maison du canal (1933) (The House by the Canal)
- Les Gens d'en face (1933) (The Window Over the Way; The People Opposite)
- Les Trois crimes de mes amis (1938) (The Three Crimes of My Friends, untranslated)
- L'Homme qui regardait passer les trains (1938) (The Man Who Watched the Trains Go By)
- Le Bourgmestre de Furnes (1939) (The Bourgomaster of Furnes)
- Les Inconnus dans la maison (1940) (The Strangers in the House)
- Malempin (1940) (The Family Lie)
- La Veuve Couderc (1942) (Ticket of Leave; The Widow; The Widow Couderc)
- La Vérité sur Bébé Donge (1942) (The Trial of Bébé Donge; I Take This Woman)
- Je me souviens (1945) (I Remember, untranslated)
- Lettre à mon juge (1947) (Act of Passion)
- La Neige était sale (1948) (The Snow Was Black; The Stain on the Snow; Dirty Snow; The Snow Was Dirty)
- Pedigree (1948) (Pedigree)
- Les Mémoires de Maigret (1951) (Maigret's Memoirs)
- La Mort de Belle (1952) (Belle)
- Maigret et l'homme du banc (1953) (Maigret and the Man on the Boulevard; Maigret and the Man on the Bench)
- L'Horloger d'Everton (1954) (The Watchmaker of Everton)
- Les Complices (1956) (The Accomplices)
- Le Président (1958) (The Premier)
- Le Train (1961) (The Train)
- Les Autres (1962) (The Others; The House on Quai Notre Dame)
- Maigret et les braves gens (1962) (Maigret and the Black Sheep; Maigret and the Good People of Montparnasse)
- Les Anneaux de Bicêtre (1963) (The Patient; The Bells of Bicêtre)
- La Chambre bleue (1964) (The Blue Room)
- Le Petit Saint (1965) (The Little Saint)
- Le Chat (1967) (The Cat)
- Lettre à ma mère (1974) (Letter to My Mother)

== Film adaptations ==
Simenon's work has been widely adapted to cinema and television. Notable films include, but are not limited to:

- Night at the Crossroads (La nuit du carrefour, France, 1932), written and directed by Jean Renoir, starring Pierre Renoir as Maigret
- The Yellow Dog (Le chien jaune, France, 1932), directed by Jean Tarride, starring Abel Tarride as Maigret
- A Man's Neck (France, 1933), directed by Julien Duvivier, starring Harry Baur as Maigret
- La Maison des sept jeunes filles (France, 1942), directed by Albert Valentin
- Annette and the Blonde Woman (Annette et la dame blonde, France, 1942), adapted by Henri Decoin, directed by Jean Dréville
- The Strangers in the House (Les inconnus dans la maison, France, 1942), adapted by Henri-Georges Clouzot & Henri Decoin, directed by Henri Decoin
- Monsieur La Souris (France, 1942), directed by Georges Lacombe
- Picpus (France, 1943), directed by Richard Pottier, starring Albert Préjean as Maigret
- Strange Inheritance (Le voyageur de la Toussaint, France, 1943), adapted from Strange Inheritance, directed by Louis Daquin
- The Man from London (L'Homme de Londres, France, 1943), directed by Henri Decoin
- Cecile Is Dead (Cécile est morte, France 1944), adapted by Jean-Paul Le Chanois & Michel Duran, directed by Maurice Tourneur, starring Albert Préjean as Maigret
- Majestic Hotel Cellars (Les caves du Majestic, France, 1945), directed by Richard Pottier, starring Albert Préjean as Maigret
- Panic (Panique, France, 1946), adapted from Les fiançailles de M. Hire, directed by Julien Duvivier
- Temptation Harbour (UK, 1947), adapted from L'homme de Londres (Newhaven-Dieppe), directed by Lance Comfort
- Last Refuge (Dernier Refuge, France, 1947), adapted from Le locataire, directed by Marc Maurette
- The Man on the Eiffel Tower (1949), adapted from La tête d'un homme, directed by Burgess Meredith, starring Charles Laughton as Maigret
- Marie of the Port (La Marie du port, France, 1950), directed by Marcel Carné
- Midnight Episode (UK, 1950), adapted from Monsieur La Souris, directed by Gordon Parry
- La Vérité sur Bébé Donge (France, 1952), directed by Henri Decoin
- Brelan d'as (France, 1952), anthology film, directed by Henri Verneuil, starring Michel Simon as Maigret
- Forbidden Fruit (Le Fruit défendu, France, 1952), directed by Henri Verneuil
- The Man Who Watched Trains Go By (UK, 1952), adapted from L'Homme qui regardait passer les trains, directed by Harold French
- La neige était sale (France, 1953), directed by Luis Saslavsky
- Maigret dirige l'enquête (France, 1956), adapted from Cécile est morte, directed by Stany Cordier, starring Maurice Manson as Maigret
- A Life in the Balance (1955), adapted from Sept petites croix dans un carnet, directed by Harry Horner and Rafael Portillo
- The Bottom of the Bottle (1956), adapted from Le fond de la bouteille, directed by Henry Hathaway
- Le Sang à la tête (France, 1956), adapted from Le Fils Cardinaud, directed by Gilles Grangier and starring Jean Gabin
- The Brothers Rico (1957), directed by Phil Karlson
- Maigret Sets a Trap (Maigret tend un piège, France, 1958), written and directed by Jean Delannoy, starring Jean Gabin as Maigret, Edgar Award for Best Foreign Film from the Mystery Writers of America in 1959
- The Stowaway (Australia, 1958), adapted from Le passager clandestin, directed by Lee Robinson and Ralph Habib
- In Case of Adversity (En cas de malheur, France, 1958), directed by Claude Autant-Lara
- Maigret et l'affaire Saint-Fiacre (France, 1959), written and directed by Jean Delannoy, starring Jean Gabin as Maigret
- Le Baron de l'écluse (France, 1960), directed by Jean Delannoy and starring Jean Gabin
- Maigret (UK, TV series, 51 episodes, 1960–1963), starring Rupert Davies as Maigret
- The President (Le Président, France, 1961), directed by Henri Verneuil and starring Jean Gabin
- The Passion of Slow Fire (La mort de Belle, France, 1961), directed by Édouard Molinaro
- Emile's Boat (Le bateau d'Émile, France, 1962), directed by Denys de La Patellière
- Maigret voit rouge (France, 1963), adapted from Maigret, Lognon et les gangsters, directed by Gilles Grangier, starring Jean Gabin as Maigret
- Magnet of Doom (L'aîné des Ferchaux, France, 1963), directed by Jean-Pierre Melville
- Le inchieste del commissario Maigret (Italy, TV series, 16 episodes, 1964–1972), starring Gino Cervi as Maigret
- Three Rooms in Manhattan (Trois chambres à Manhattan, France, 1965), directed by Marcel Carné
- Maigret und sein größter Fall (West Germany, 1966), adapted from La Danseuse du Gai-Moulin, directed by Alfred Weidenmann, starring Heinz Rühmann as Maigret
- Maigret a Pigalle (Italy, 1966), adapted from Maigret au "Picratt's", directed by Mario Landi, starring Gino Cervi as Maigret
- Thirteen Against Fate (British TV series, 1966), thought lost, now all recovered
- Stranger in the House (UK, 1967), adapted from Les inconnus dans la maison, directed by Pierre Rouve
- Les enquêtes du commissaire Maigret (France, TV series, 88 episodes, 1967–1990), starring Jean Richard as Maigret
- Le chat (France, 1971), directed by Pierre Granier-Deferre
- The Widow Couderc (La veuve Couderc, France, 1971), directed by Pierre Granier-Deferre
- The Train (Le train, France, 1971), directed by Pierre Granier-Deferre
- The Clockmaker (L'horloger de Saint-Paul, France, 1974), directed by Bertrand Tavernier
- Armchair Cinema: The Prison (Euston Films/Thames Television, 1974), adapted from "La prison"
- The Murderer (West Germany, 1979), directed by Ottokar Runze
- L'Étoile du Nord (France, 1982), directed by Pierre Granier-Deferre
- The Hatter's Ghost (Les Fantômes du Chapelier, France, 1982), written and directed by Claude Chabrol
- Équateur (France, 1983), written and directed by Serge Gainsbourg
- Maigret (1988) appeared on ITV casting Richard Harris in the lead role.
- Monsieur Hire (France, 1989), written and directed by Patrice Leconte
- Seven Days After Murder (Azerbaijan & Russia, 1991), written by Rustam Ibragimbekov, directed by Rasim Ojagov
- Maigret (France, TV series, 54 episodes, 1991–2005), starring Bruno Cremer as Maigret
- Granada Television produced an adaptation of Maigret for ITV in 1992 and 1993 in which Michael Gambon starred as Maigret; there were 12 adaptations in the two series.
- Betty (France, 1992), written and directed by Claude Chabrol
- El pasajero clandestino (Spain, 1995), adapted from Le passager clandestin, directed by Agustí Villaronga
- La Maison du canal (France and Belgium, 2003), directed by Alain Berliner
- Red Lights (France, 2004), directed by Cédric Kahn
- The Man from London (Hungary, 2007), written and directed by Béla Tarr
- The Blue Room (France, 2014), written and directed by Mathieu Amalric
- La Boule noire (France, 2014), directed by Denis Malleval
- Maigret (UK, TV series, 4 episodes, 2016-2017), starring Rowan Atkinson as Maigret
- Maigret (France, 2022), directed by Patrice Leconte and featuring Gérard Dépardieu as Maigret
- Maigret (UK, TV series, since 2025 in US), starring Benjamin Wainwright as Maigret

== Stage adaptations ==
- The Red Barn, written by David Hare and based on the novel La Main (English title The Man on the Bench in the Barn). Directed by Robert Icke at the Lyttelton Theatre, London, in October 2016.

== Works cited ==
- Bresler, Fenton (1983). The Mystery of Georges Simenon: A Biography. New York: Stein & Day. ISBN 0812862414.
- Forshaw, Barry (2022). Simenon: the Man, the Books, the Films, a 21st Century Guide. Harpenden, UK: Oldcastle Books. ISBN 9780857305145.
- Marnham, Patrick (1994). The Man who wasn't Maigret, A Portrait of Georges Simenon. New York: Harvest/Harcourt Brace & Company. ISBN 0156000598.
- Wenger, Murielle; Trussel, Stephen (2017). Maigret's World: A Reader's Companion to Simenon's Famous Detective. Jefferson, North Carolina: McFarland & Company. ISBN 978-1-4766-2925-4.
- Young, Trudee (1976). Georges Simenon, a checklist of his 'Maigret' and other mystery novels and short stories in French and in English translations. Metuchen, N.J.: The Scarecrow Press. ISBN 0-8108-0964-8.
