= Julieta (film) =

2016 film by Pedro Almodóvar

- Theatrical release poster
- Directed by: Pedro Almodóvar
- Screenplay by: Pedro Almodóvar
- Based on: "Chance", "Silence" and "Soon" by Alice Munro
- Produced by: Agustín Almodóvar; Esther García
- Starring: Emma Suárez; Adriana Ugarte; Daniel Grao; Inma Cuesta; Darío Grandinetti; Michelle Jenner; Rossy de Palma
- Cinematography: Jean-Claude Larrieu
- Edited by: José Salcedo
- Music by: Alberto Iglesias
- Production company: El Deseo
- Distributed by: Warner Bros. Pictures
- Release dates: 4 April 2016 (Phenomena); 8 April 2016 (Spain)
- Running time: 96 minutes
- Country: Spain
- Language: Spanish
- Box office: $22.5 million

Julieta (Spanish pronunciation: [xuˈljeta]), originally titled Silencio, is a 2016 Spanish melodrama film written and directed by Pedro Almodóvar. It is based on "Chance", "Silence", and "Soon", three short stories by Alice Munro from her 2004 collection Runaway. It is Almodóvar's 20th feature, and stars Emma Suárez and Adriana Ugarte as old and young Julieta, alongside Daniel Grao, Inma Cuesta, Darío Grandinetti, Michelle Jenner, and Rossy de Palma.

The film was released theatrically in Spain on 8 April 2016 by Warner Bros. Pictures to generally positive reviews. It made its international debut at the 2016 Cannes Film Festival, where it was selected to compete for the Palme d'Or, and was released across the world throughout the remainder of 2016. Julieta grossed over $22 million worldwide.

It was selected by the Academia de las Artes y las Ciencias Cinematográficas de España as the Spanish entry for the Best Foreign Language Film at the 89th Academy Awards, but did not make the shortlist. It was nominated for the BAFTA Award for Best Film Not in the English Language, in addition to receiving four nominations for European Film Awards and seven nominations for Goya Awards.

== Plot ==
Julieta lives in Madrid and is about to move to Portugal with her boyfriend Lorenzo. In a chance encounter on the street with her daughter Antía's childhood friend Beatriz, she learns that Antía, from whom she has long been estranged, is living in Switzerland and has three children. Overcome by her desire to re-establish contact with Antía, she abandons plans to leave Spain and instead leases an apartment elsewhere in the building in Madrid where she had raised Antía, knowing that address is Antía's only means of contacting her.

Anticipating word from Antía, and aware that she owes her daughter an explanation of the events that led to their separation, Julieta fills a journal with an account of her life as mother, spouse, and daughter. She begins with the story of meeting Xoan, a fisherman and Antía's father. In a flashback, Julieta recounts meeting Xoan on a train, having fled to the restaurant carriage from an older man. He tells her about his life as a fisherman, and his wife who is in a coma. The train stops sharply, having hit the older man, who committed suicide. As Julieta blames herself for his death, Xoan comforts her, and they have sex on the train. Later, at the school at which she works, Julieta receives a letter from Xoan which she takes as an invitation to visit. She learns his wife has recently died and that he is with Ava, a friend. Julieta and Xoan resume their relationship, and she informs him that she is pregnant with his child. Two years later, Julieta and Antía visit Julieta's parents. Her mother is ill and apparently suffering from Alzheimer's disease, at first not recognising her daughter. Her father is having an affair with the maid, to Julieta's chagrin.

While an older Antía is at a summer camp, Xoan and Julieta argue over his occasional dalliances with Ava, prompted by the housekeeper. Julieta storms out to walk and Xoan goes fishing despite the weather. A storm rolls in and, as Julieta watches the news in panic, Xoan's boat capsizes and he is killed. His body is recovered and cremated, and together with Ava she casts Xoan's ashes out over the sea. Rather than call her back for the cremation, Julieta has left Antía at camp where she has become inseparable with a girl named Beatriz from a wealthy family, who invite Antía to leave camp a day early and spend some time with them in Madrid. Julieta then travels to Madrid, to break the news of Xoan's death to her daughter, and rents a flat there. They remain in Madrid, each doing their own thing but without sharing their respective lives, loves and sorrows. At the age of 18, Antía embarks on a spiritual retreat and announces that she will be incommunicado for three months.

When Julieta drives to the location of the retreat in the Pyrenees three months later, she is informed that her daughter has found enlightenment and has already left: she does not want her location disclosed to her mother. Julieta is racked by the loss and her attempts to find Antía are unsuccessful. The only contact she has is a blank card on her 19th, 20th and 21st birthdays, which she recognises with a cake that ends up uneaten in the trash. After the latter she has enough, becomes enraged and destroys most traces of her daughter in her life, including moving from her apartment to escape Antía's memory. Years later she visits Ava, who has multiple sclerosis and is dying. Ava tells her that Antía knew about the argument that precipitated Xoan's death and blamed Julieta and Ava, and that she had ultimately internalised guilt about this because she was away at camp at the time. First in the hospital and then at Ava's funeral, Julieta meets Lorenzo who has had an affair with Ava and has written a book about Ava's art. For some time the two embark on a happy relationship, which distracts Julieta from her loss. She tells him nothing of Antía and he respects that she has some secrets in her life.

Back in the present, Lorenzo has gone to Portugal and Julieta's mental state is deteriorating as she obsessively visits places she used to go to with her daughter. Beatriz happens to recognise her as the two watch young girls play basketball, and reveals that she and Antía had a relationship. The spiritual retreat may have made Antía ashamed of it, and caused her to cut Beatriz out of her life just as she had done with Julieta.

Julieta continues to deteriorate, walking through the city in a dreamlike state. She recognises Lorenzo on the street and, walking toward him, is hit by a car and collapses. Lorenzo takes her to the hospital, and, as she recovers, he goes to pick up items from her flat, which include an unread letter. It is from Antía, who tells her about the death of her 9-year-old son, which has finally allowed her to understand how Julieta must have felt when Antía left without leaving word. She has included a return address, which Lorenzo interprets as an invitation to visit. Lorenzo and Julieta drive to Switzerland and Julieta says she will not demand an explanation, simply wishing to be with her daughter.

== Cast ==
- Emma Suárez as Julieta Arcos
- Adriana Ugarte as younger Julieta Arcos
- Daniel Grao as Xoan, Julieta's partner
- Inma Cuesta as Ava
- Michelle Jenner as Beatriz
- Darío Grandinetti as Lorenzo Gentile
- Rossy de Palma as Marian
- Susi Sánchez as Sara, Julieta's mother
- Pilar Castro as Claudia, Beatriz's mother
- Joaquín Notario as Samuel, Julieta's father
- Nathalie Poza as Juana
- Mariam Bachir as Sanáa, Julieta's parents' maid
- Blanca Parés as Antía (18 years old)
- Priscilla Delgado as Antía (adolescent)
- Sara Jiménez as Beatriz (adolescent)

== Production ==
=== Development ===
Julieta marked Almodóvar's 20th feature film. The film was inspired by Chance, Silence and Soon, three short stories from the 2004 book Runaway by Nobel laureate Alice Munro, from whom Almodóvar bought the film rights in 2009. He later said he specifically asked for the rights due to the pivotal scenes that take place on a train: "There is something incredibly passionate about them", he said. "A woman, on a train, and it's very cinematographic". The director admitted that he had not been completely faithful to the source material, but noted the significance of Munro's depiction of family relationships and the links between women, which he believed to be an important part of his adaptation. It is Almodóvar's third film to be based on a foreign-language text, following Live Flesh (1997) and The Skin I Live In (2011). He first titled the film Silencio (English: Silence), based on the title of one of the short stories, but changed it to Julieta in post-production to avoid confusion with Martin Scorsese's Silence, which was also released in 2016.

Almodóvar originally thought Julieta would serve as his English-language film debut, with American actress Meryl Streep in the lead role, playing three versions of the character at 20, 40 and 60 years old. He met Streep, who agreed to the concept, and found locations in Vancouver, British Columbia, Canada, where Munro based her stories. He also searched for locations in the state of New York, but eventually shelved the idea, unhappy at the prospect of filming in either country and uncomfortable with his ability to write and film in English. Years later, members of his production team suggested that the script should be revisited but, this time, setting the film in Spain and making it in Spanish.

Almodóvar revealed the film's original title, Silencio, in an interview with the Financial Times after attending a preview of the musical of his film Women on the Verge of a Nervous Breakdown at the Playhouse Theatre in London, in January 2015. Silence is "the principal element that drives the worst things that happen to the main female protagonist", Almodóvar said. He also stated that the film was a return to drama and his "cinema of women", but claimed that the tone was different from that of his other feminine dramas like The Flower of My Secret (1995), All About My Mother (1999) and Volver (2006). He explained that he had finished the script, but was in the process of casting. In March 2015, Rossy de Palma, who frequently appears in Almodóvar's films, confirmed she had a role in the film, followed by the announcement that Emma Suárez and Adriana Ugarte were playing the older and younger versions of the film's protagonist. On the employment of two actresses, Almodóvar later said, "I don't trust the effects of make-up for aging, and it's almost impossible for a young woman of 25 to have the presence of someone of 50. It isn't a matter of wrinkles, it's something more profound, the passing of time, on the outside and on the inside". Suárez also revealed that using two actresses was an homage to That Obscure Object of Desire (1977) by Luis Buñuel, in which two actresses also play the same character at different stages in life. El Deseo revealed more casting in March 2015.

In preparation for the film, Almodóvar encouraged Suárez and Ugarte to read The Year of Magical Thinking (2005), a book on mourning by American author Joan Didion, and Other Lives but Mine (2009) by French writer Emmanuel Carrère for inspiration. Almodóvar also recommended Suárez watch Elevator to the Gallows (1958) by Louis Malle and The Hours (2002) by Stephen Daldry, and that she contemplate Lucian Freud's paintings. Suárez also watched Almodóvar's complete filmography and stayed alone in Madrid to prepare for the character. "It's a very tough character. For me it meant going into a pit of darkness where there is abandonment, loneliness and fear", Suárez stated in an interview. She also revealed that the two actresses worked on their versions of the character independently; the couple were only together on set for the train sequence.

=== Filming ===
On working with the pair, Almodóvar said: "I battled a lot with the actresses' tears, against the physical need to cry. It is a very expressive battle. It wasn't out of reservedness, but because I didn't want tears, what I wanted was dejection – the thing that stays inside after years and years of pain. I adore melodrama, it's a noble genre, a truly great genre, but I was very clear that I didn't want anything epic, I wanted something else. Simply put, this had to be a very dry, tearless film". In an interview with the BBC, Almodóvar said there were comic situations in rehearsals, but he wanted to set the humour aside: "I wanted something more intense; I wanted something cleaner to make sure the message got through". Almodóvar stated that he wanted to create something more austere and restrained than his previous films; he also reflected on the physical pain he had experienced in the past years which he believed to have inspired him to create a piece about solitude.

Julieta went into production in April 2015 with Jean-Claude Larrieu as cinematographer and frequent collaborator Alberto Iglesias composing the film's score. Sonia Grande, another frequent collaborator, was responsible for the film's costume design. Filming was due to begin on 6 May 2015, but actually commenced on 18 May 2015; Madrid, the Galician Rías Altas, La Sierra in Huelva, the Pyrenees in Aragón, Panticosa and Fanlo were among the locations used for filming. Almodóvar later stated that he wanted to use the deserted mountainous areas to mark a significant distance from the city of Madrid to emphasise how the characters change their outlooks on life according to the environment they are in. In search of locations, Almodóvar collaborated with the Huesca Film Office. Photographs from the set began to appear online towards the end of May 2015. Filming was completed on 7 August 2015.

== Release ==
El Deseo first unveiled a teaser poster for the film online in July 2015, followed by a teaser trailer and a new teaser poster in January 2016. The film's international trailer and official poster were released online the following month.

Julieta premiered at the Phenomena Experience cinema in Barcelona on 4 April 2016. It was also due to be screened at the Yelmo Ideal cinema in Madrid on 6 April 2016, where Almodóvar had planned to deliver interviews and have photos. However, due to the controversy surrounding his name being listed in the Panama Papers earlier that week, he cancelled the event and all other press engagements for the film in the run up to its release. Julieta was released to the public on 8 April 2016 in Spain; a special screening was held in Almodóvar's hometown, Calzada de Calatrava, on the day to celebrate the release of his 20th feature film. Though he did not attend, he recorded a special video message which was broadcast to the audience watching.

After much speculation, the film made its international debut at the 2016 Cannes Film Festival, where it was in competition for the Palme d'Or, Almodóvar's fifth film to be selected for the competition. It was then released on 18 May in France, 26 May in Italy, and 23 June in Brazil. In June, Julieta also screened out-of-competition at the Sydney Film Festival, followed by its opening of the Jerusalem Film Festival and the Queensland Film Festival in July. It was also released on 8 July in Mexico. In the United Kingdom, the film was released by Pathé and distributed by their distribution partner 20th Century Fox, and had received its premiere at Somerset House in London, in a special event in which Almodóvar made an appearance, followed by its general release to the British public on 26 August. In the United States, Julieta debuted at the New York Film Festival, before being released to the American public on 21 December 2016, distributed by Sony Pictures Classics, their ninth Almodóvar picture, with its sales handled by FilmNation Entertainment, their third Almodóvar film. In Canada, it was shown at the 2016 Toronto International Film Festival.

== Reception ==
=== Critical response ===
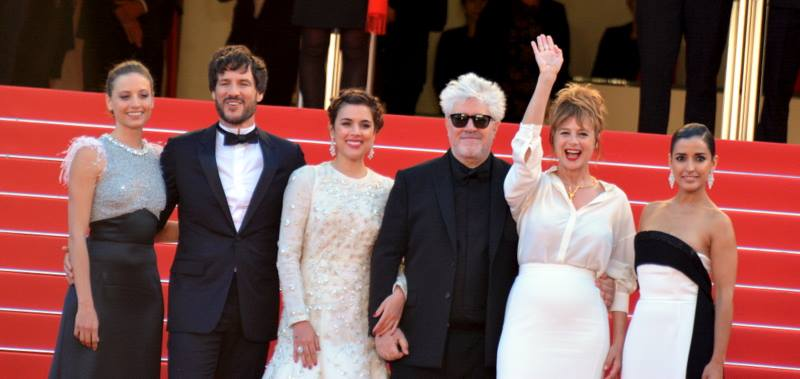
Director and stars at the 2016 Cannes Film Festival

Reviews for Julieta were generally favourable and much less critical than those Almodóvar received for his previous film I'm So Excited (2013). On the review aggregator website Rotten Tomatoes, Julieta holds an approval rating of 84% based on 207 reviews, with an average rating of 7.5/10. The website's critics consensus states, "Julieta finds writer-director Pedro Almodóvar revisiting familiar themes – and doing so with his signature skill." Metacritic, which uses a weighted average, assigned the film a score of 73 out of 100, based on 31 critics, which indicates "generally favourable reviews".

The film drew praise from critics in Spain, including La Vanguardia, who compared Julieta to the female-centric films of George Cukor and Kenji Mizoguchi while noting hints of Alfred Hitchcock in Almodóvar's screenplay. Alfonso Rivera of Cineuropa additionally observed influences of Ingmar Bergman, Krzysztof Kieślowski and Douglas Sirk in Almodóvar's style. Vicente Molina Fox from El País believed Almodóvar had achieved the best script of his career with Julieta, while Luis Martínez of El Mundo, despite finding issues with the narrative, thought Julieta was Almodóvar's "most difficult and most pure film". The Spanish edition of Vanity Fair also called it "the most Almodóvar film by Almodóvar". Quim Casas from El Periódico de Catalunya said that Almodóvar had reinvented melodrama: "Prodigious in dramatic tone, Julieta is very Almodóvarian but at the same time different to other works by the auteur". ABC gave the film a mixed review; praising Suárez in the lead role but criticising narrative choices. Carlos Boyero, the "sworn critical enemy" of Almodóvar, penned an extremely negative review in El País, feeling distanced and unable to identify with the characters because of the film's style and cinematography. Boyero stated that "the film conveys nothing to me, either emotionally or artistically". El Confidencial also responded negatively, calling the film "a barren drama", "unsubtle" and "self-indulgent".

Julieta had a warm reception at the Cannes Film Festival, which was followed by extremely positive reactions from French film critics. According to AlloCiné, based on 29 reviews from critics in France, Julieta received an average rating of 4.4 out of 5, making it one of the best reviewed films released in France in 2016. Numerous sources such as Cahiers du Cinéma, Le Monde, Positif, Ouest-France and Le Parisien gave the film their highest five-star rating. Le Monde called it "a beautiful film of very pure sadness" and La Croix who thought the theme of guilt was a welcome new addition to Almodóvar's work, calling Julieta "a beautiful and intense film". L'Express thought Almodóvar had returned to the top of his game with Julieta, calling it "a work constantly on the edge, never overwhelmed by its own emotions, deliberately cold [and] even austere". Libération gave a positive review, but felt the film was "too well-oiled" which prevented the drama of the story from "truly expressing all its power of emotional attraction". However, L'Humanité was largely negative, concluding that "the film is very narrative and severely short of breath".

The British press were very positive about the film: Screen Daily labelled the film "an anxious, tantalising creature which returns the Spanish director to the exclusive world of women" and stated that Almodóvar's "distinctive voice [grows] in texture and depth with each new production". Empire also responded very positively, calling the film "a celebration of elegance and good living as well as motherly love and romance". Time Out singled out the cinematography, design, costumes and Iglesias' score as "typically exquisite", concluding that: "It might be familiar territory for Almodóvar, but only a master of his art could make it look so easy". The Daily Telegraph called the film a "guilt-soaked pleasure" and also highlighted its score and cinematography as well as the performances of Suárez and Ugarte. London Evening Standard labelled the film "a harrowing examination of broken maternity and ever-present mortality", stating that the film is "excellently acted, brightly filmed [and] seriously good". Gay Star News highlighted the "visually resplendent" cinematography and "sensitive" acting performances, concluding that "all the Almodóvar trademarks are here, and he's as flamboyant and fun as ever – but there's a seriousness to this familial drama that's as compelling as it is deeply satisfying". Peter Bradshaw of The Guardian thought the film was a "fluent and engaging work", stating that "the colours – and the women – pop in the Spanish auteur's adaptation of three Alice Munro stories, but there's something intentionally unsatisfying at the heart of this minor work". Sight & Sound felt Almodóvar had "play[ed] it straighter than usual" and felt a disconnect between the visual and the emotional elements, which undermined the "nuanced realism" of the two lead performances, calling the film "a surprisingly flat offering from Spain's most vibrant auteur". The Spectator also felt that "the gloss ends up cramping the story" and concluded that "the film could have used more of the classic Almodóvar weirdness".

American critics tended to have more mixed feelings, like Collider, who called the film "an engaging yet uneven melodrama", and Variety, who stated that while the film was "a welcome return to the female-centric storytelling that has earned Almodóvar his greatest acclaim, it is far from this reformed renegade's strongest or most entertaining work". Similarly mixed, Slant Magazine thought Julieta was not one of Almodóvar's best films, but most compelling because of "the bold, colorful compositions and framings that [he] has long mastered, which sketch psychological detail more acutely than Julieta's methodically orchestrated and rather sluggish story". Twitch Film felt the mellowness of Munro's work did not adapt well to Almodóvar's melodramatic style, concluding that "Almodóvar seems content to let his past strengths wither in favour of banality". Indiewire also thought the director played too safe and called Julieta his most conventional film. The Hollywood Reporter felt the film would satisfy fans of Almodóvar, but was too decorous in comparison to his previous films: "a politeness that's quite unlike the lusty vulgarity of the past. Some of us may not be sure we like it". However, TheWrap thought that "a subdued Almodóvar is still a far sight weirder and more intriguing than most directors", adding that the film is "a worthy part of a canon in which decorous should never be confused with dull". A.O. Scott of the New York Times wrote "Julieta is scrupulous, compassionate and surprising, even if it does not always quite communicate the full gravity and sweep of the feelings it engages."

=== Box office ===
In Spain, the film opened in 203 cinemas. Over its opening weekend, it attracted 79,523 spectators, making €585,989. This was reportedly Almodóvar's worst opening at the Spanish box office in 20 years. Agustín Almodóvar later admitted that the film being a drama and not a comedy, made it harder to sell to a mainstream audience, coupled with the Panama Papers scandal which provoked Almodóvar to halt all press engagements in the run up to Julieta's release were the two main factors in the disappointing box office results. In its first week, Julieta made €1,180,017 in Spain, making it the fifth-highest grossing film of the week, but was overshadowed by films like The Jungle Book and Kiki, el amor se hace. It stayed at number 5 the following week, but the film's earnings dropped by 43%, making €348,515. Box office takings then continued to fall; earning €220,000 in its third week, then €119,131 in its fourth, before falling out of the top 10 to number 17 in its fifth week. The film made a total of $2.4 million in Spain.

Julieta became the second-highest-grossing film of the week when it opened in France, and grossed over $4.9 million in the country. In Italy, it debuted as the fourth-highest-grossing film of the week and went on to accumulate $2.4 million. In the United Kingdom, Julieta made £1.1 million ($1.5 million) in its first three weeks, becoming the highest-grossing non-Bollywood foreign language film at the UK box office since 2012 comedy The Intouchables. Overall, it made $1.7 million in the UK. In the United States, it made $839,000. Worldwide, the film grossed a total of $22.5 million at the box office.

=== Accolades ===
Before its release, the Los Angeles Times predicted that the film could be an Academy Award contender. In September 2016, the Spanish Academy selected Julieta as the Spanish entry for the Best Foreign Language Film at the 89th Academy Awards. In December 2016, Julieta was eliminated from the competition and did not make the shortlist.

List of awards and nominations
Year	Award	Category	Recipients	Result	Ref.
2016	Alliance of Women Film Journalists	Best Non-English-Language Film	Pedro Almodóvar	Nominated	
2016	Cannes Film Festival	Palme d'Or	Pedro Almodóvar	Nominated	
2016	Chicago Film Critics Association	Best Foreign Language Film	Julieta	Nominated	
2016	Critics' Choice Awards	Best Foreign Language Film	Julieta	Nominated	
2016	European Film Awards	Best Film	Julieta	Nominated	
2016	European Film Awards	Best Director	Pedro Almodóvar	Nominated	
2016	European Film Awards	Best Actress	Emma Suárez	Nominated	
2016	European Film Awards	Best Actress	Adriana Ugarte	Nominated	
2016	San Diego International Film Festival	Best International Film	Julieta	Won	
2016	Washington D.C. Area Film Critics Association	Best Foreign Language Film	Julieta	Nominated	
2016	Women Film Critics Circle	Best Foreign Film by or about Women	Julieta	Nominated	
2017	AARP Annual Movies for Grownups Awards	Best Screenwriter	Pedro Almodóvar	Nominated	
2017	Australian Film Critics Association	Best International Film (Foreign Language)	Julieta	Nominated	
2017	British Academy Film Awards	Best Film Not in the English Language	Julieta	Nominated	
2017	Goya Awards	Best Film	Julieta	Nominated	
2017	Goya Awards	Best Director	Pedro Almodóvar	Nominated	
2017	Goya Awards	Best Adapted Screenplay	Pedro Almodóvar	Nominated	
2017	Goya Awards	Best Actress	Emma Suárez	Won	
2017	Goya Awards	Best Original Score	Alberto Iglesias	Nominated	
2017	Goya Awards	Best Hair and Makeup	Ana López-Puigcerver, Sergio Perez Berbel and David Martí	Nominated	
2017	Goya Awards	Best Special Effects	Kings Abbots and Eduardo Diaz	Nominated	
2017	National Board of Review	Top 5 Foreign Films	Julieta	Won	
2017	Premios Feroz	Best Drama Film	Julieta	Nominated	
2017	Premios Feroz	Best Director	Pedro Almodóvar	Nominated	
2017	Premios Feroz	Best Screenplay	Pedro Almodóvar	Nominated	
2017	Premios Feroz	Best Actress	Emma Suárez	Nominated	
2017	Premios Feroz	Best Actress	Adriana Ugarte	Nominated	
2017	Premios Feroz	Best Supporting Actress	Rossy de Palma	Nominated	
2017	Premios Feroz	Best Original Soundtrack	Alberto Iglesias	Nominated	
2017	Premios Feroz	Best Trailer	Julieta	Nominated	
2017	Premios Feroz	Best Poster	Julieta	Nominated	
2017	Satellite Awards	Best Foreign Language Film	Julieta	Nominated	

== See also ==
- List of submissions to the 89th Academy Awards for Best Foreign Language Film
- List of Spanish submissions for the Academy Award for Best Foreign Language Film
