= Linda Coverdale =

American literary translator

Linda Coverdale is a literary translator from French. She lives in Brooklyn, New York, and has a Ph.D in French Literature. She has translated into English more than 60 works by such authors as Roland Barthes, Emmanuel Carrère, Patrick Chamoiseau, Maryse Condé, Marie Darrieussecq, Jean Echenoz, Annie Ernaux, Sébastien Japrisot, Tahar Ben Jelloun, Philippe Labro, Yann Queffélec, Jorge Semprún, Lyonel Trouillot, Jean-Philippe Toussaint, Jean Hartzfeld, Sylvain Tesson and Marguerite Duras.

== Translations ==
- The Grain of the Voice by Roland Barthes (Hill & Wang, 1985)
- Once Upon A Time: Visions of Old Japan by Chantal Edel (The Friendly Press, 1986)
- The Stones Cry Out: A Cambodian Childhood by Molyda Szymusiak (Hill & Wang, 1986)
- Sweet Death by Claude Tardat (The Overlook Press, 1987)
- The Wedding by Yann Queffélec (Macmillan, 1987)
- Mortal Embrace: Living With AIDS by Alain Emmanuel Dreuilhe (Hill & Wang, 1988)
- The Children of Segu by Maryse Condé (Viking Penguin, 1989)
- Out of Reach by Emmanuel Carrère (translation for Macmillan, 1990)
- Lion Mountain by Mustapha Tlili (Arcade Publishing/Little by Brown & Company, 1990)
- To The Friend Who Did Not Save My Life by Hervé Guibert (Atheneum, 1991)
- Le Petit Garçon by Philippe Labro (Farrar, Straus & Giroux, 1992)
- A Very Long Engagement by Sébastien Japrisot (Farrar, Straus & Giroux, 1993)
- Compulsory Happiness by Norman Manea (Farrar, Straus & Giroux, 1993)
- The Traveler’s Tree by Bruno Bontempelli (The New Press, 1994)
- A Frozen Woman by Annie Ernaux (Four Walls Eight Windows, 1995)
- What the Night Tells the Day by Hector Bianciotti (The New Press, 1995)
- Creole Folktales by Patrick Chamoiseau (The New Press, 1995)
- School Days by Patrick Chamoiseau (The University of Nebraska Press, 1996)
- Naming the Jungle by Antoine Volodine (The New Press, 1996)
- Black Tunnel White Light by Philippe Labro (Kodansha America, 1997)
- Pig Tales by Marie Darrieussecq (The New Press, 1997)
- Class Trip by Emmanuel Carrère (Metropolitan Books/Henry Holt, 1997)
- Literature or Life by Jorge Semprún (Viking, 1997)
- Rider on the Rain by Sébastien Japrisot (The Harvill Press, 1998)
- Shadows of a Childhood by Élisabeth Gille (The New Press, 1998)
- Mamzelle Dragonfly by Raphaël Confiant (Farrar Straus & Giroux, 1999)
- Chronicle of the Seven Sorrows by Patrick Chamoiseau (The University of Nebraska Press, 1999)
- Lila Says by Chimo (Scribner, 1999)
- Undercurrents by Marie Darrieussecq (The New Press, 2000)
- The Adversary by Emmanuel Carrère (Metropolitan Books/Henry Holt, 2000)
- Speak You Also by Paul Steinberg (Metropolitan Books/Henry Holt, 2000)
- My Forbidden Face by Latifa (Miramax Books, 2001)
- 'Stories' by Mohammed Dib & Monique Agénor (The Hudson Review, Autumn 2001)
- This Blinding Absence of Light by Tahar Ben Jelloun (The New Press, 2001)
- The Absolute Perfection of Crime by Tanguy Viel (The New Press, 2002)
- Making Love by Jean-Philippe Toussaint (The New Press, 2003)
- Street of Lost Footsteps by Lyonel Trouillot (The University of Nebraska Press, 2003)
- The Prophecy of the Stones by Flavia Bujor (Miramax Books, 2004)
- Happy Days by Laurent Graff (Carroll & Graf Publishers, 2004)
- Massacre River by René Philoctète (New Directions, 2005)
- Machete Season by Jean Hatzfeld (Farrar, Straus & Giroux/Serpent's Tail, 2005)
- The Lecture by Lydie Salvayre (Dalkey Archive Press, 2005)
- In the Name of Honor by Mukhtar Mai (Atria/Simon & Schuster, 2006)
- Freedom by Malika Oufkir (Miramax Books, 2006)
- Life Laid Bare by Jean Hatzfeld (Other Press, 2007)
- Ravel by Jean Echenoz (The New Press, 2007)
- A French Life by Jean-Paul Dubois (Knopf, 2007)
- You Have Only One Picture Left by Laurent Graff (film script, OuiDO! Entertainment, 2008)
- Beyond Suspicion by Tanguy Viel (The New Press, 2008)
- Wartime Writings: 1943-1949 by Marguerite Duras (The New Press, 2008)
- The Children of Heroes by Lyonel Trouillot (The University of Nebraska Press, 2008)
- Running by Jean Echenoz (The New Press, 2009)
- The Antelope's Strategy by Jean Hatzfeld (Farrar, Straus & Giroux, 2009)
- Leaving Tangier by Tahar Ben Jelloun (Penguin, 2009)
- 'Fiction in the First Person, or Immoral Writing', Marie Darrieussecq (L'Esprit Créateur, Vol. 50, No. 3, Fall 2010)
- A Palace in the Old Village by Tahar Ben Jelloun (Penguin, 2010)
- My Life as a Russian Novel by Emmanuel Carrère (Metropolitan Books/Henry Holt, 2010)
- I Am Nujood, Age Ten and Divorced by Nujood Ali (Crown/Random House, 2010)
- A Tale of Two Martyrs by Tahar Ben Jelloun (Granta, 2011)
- Lives Other than My Own by Emmanuel Carrère (Metropolitan Books/Henry Holt, 2011)
- There Are Things I Want You to Know… by Eva Gabrielsson (Seven Stories Press, 2011)
- Lightning by Jean Echenoz (The New Press, 2011)
- La Petite by Michèle Halberstadt (Other Press, 2012)
- The Suitors by Cécile David-Weill (Other Press, 2012)
- "On Europa" by Marie Darrieussecq, The Trunk (Les éditions Gallimard, 2013)
- The Art of Sleeping Alone by Sophie Fontanelle (Simon & Schuster, 2013)
- Consolation of the Forest by Sylvain Tesson (Rizzoli Ex Libris, 2013)
- The Hanged Man of Saint-Pholien by Georges Simenon (Penguin Modern Classics, 2014)
- 1914 by Jean Echenoz (The New Press, 2014)
- Viviane by Julia Deck (The New Press, 2014)
- Night at the Crossroads by Georges Simenon (Penguin Modern Classics, 2014)
- The Queen's Caprice by Jean Echenoz (The New Press, 2015)
- The Misty Harbor by Georges Simenon (Penguin Modern Classics, 2015)
- The Emperor, C'est Moi by Hugo Horiot (Seven Stories Press, 2015)
- Maigret in New York by Georges Simenon (Penguin Modern Classics, 2016)
- Maigret at the Coroner's by Georges Simenon (Penguin Modern Classics, 2016)
- The Hand by Georges Simenon (Penguin Modern Classics, 2016)
- "Julie's Life" by Emmanuel Carrère (Granta, 2016)
- Maigret Goes to School by Georges Simenon (Penguin Modern Classics, 2017)
- "New York Diary" by Édouard Louis (Bomb Magazine, Fall 2017)
- "Who Killed My Father?" by Édouard Louis (Speech at Litteraturhuset, Oslo, October 2017)
- Slave Old Man by Patrick Chamoiseau (The New Press, 2018)
- The Punishment by Tahar Ben Jelloun (Yale University Press, 2020)

== Honors ==
- 1997 French-American Foundation Translation Prize: Literature or Life
- 1999 Chevalier de l’Ordre des Arts et des Lettres (Chevalier dans l'Ordre des Arts et des Lettres).
- 1999 Finalist French-American Foundation Translation Prize: Chronicle of the Seven Sorrows
- 2003 Finalist PEN/Book-of-the-Month Club Translation Prize: This Blinding Absence of Light
- 2004 International Dublin Literary Award: This Blinding Absence of Light
- 2004 Finalist PEN/Book-of-the-Month Club Translation Prize: Street of Lost Footsteps
- 2005 Finalist French-American Foundation Fiction Translation Prize: Making Love
- 2006 Scott Moncrieff Prize (Scott Moncrieff Prize): Machete Season .
- 2006 Finalist Independent Foreign Fiction Prize: This Blinding Absence of Light
- 2006 Finalist French-American Foundation Fiction Translation Prize: Massacre River
- 2007 French-American Foundation Translation Prize: Ravel (Fiction)
- 2008 Finalist French-American Foundation Translation Prize: Life Laid Bare (Nonfiction)
- 2009 Finalist International IMPAC Dublin Literary Award: Ravel
- 2010 Runner-up Scott Moncrieff Prize: The Strategy of Antelopes (Serpents Tail)
- 2012 Finalist Best Translated Book Award: Lightning (Fiction)
- 2013 French Voices Award: Viviane
- 2013 A Financial Times Best Book of the Year: Consolations of the Forest
- 2014 Dolman Best Travel Book of the Year Award: Consolations of the Forest
- 2015 Best Translated Book Award Fiction Selection: 1914
- 2018 New York Times Notable Book of 2018: Slave Old Man
- 2019 National Book Critics Circle Fiction Award Finalist: Slave Old Man
- 2019 French-American Foundation Translation Prize Fiction Finalist: Slave Old Man
