= Moustache (disambiguation) =

A moustache is a type of facial hair grown on the upper lip of a man.

Moustache can also refer to:

== People and pets ==
- Moustache (actor) (1929–1987), French actor and jazz drummer
- Moustache (dog) (1799–1812), a French poodle said to have participated in the French Revolutionary Wars and Napoleonic Wars
- Princesse Moustache (Princess Natalya Petrovna Galitzine, née Chernysheva or Chernyshyova; 1741–1837), a Russian noble and lady in waiting

== Art, entertainment, and media ==
=== Film ===
- Moustache, a character in the 1963 film Irma La Douce
- The Moustache (2005), a French film
- Mustache (film), a 2023 Pakistani American film

=== Music ===
==== Groups ====
- Mustasch, a rock group from Sweden

==== Albums ====
- Moustache (album), a music album by British band Farrah
- Moustache (Half a Scissor), a music album by French music producer Mr. Oizo

==== Songs ====
- "Moustache" (song), a song by French band Twin Twin (2014)
- "Mustache", a song by the country music band Heartland (2009)
- "Moustache", a song by Sparks from album Angst in My Pants (1982)
- "The Moustache Song", a song by Stephen Foster (1800s)

== Literature ==
- The Moustache, a 1986 French novel by Emmanuel Carrère
- Moustache (novel), a 2018 Indian novel by S. Hareesh

== Computing and technology ==
- Mustache (template system), a web template system
- Moustache, a type of variable geometry canard on an aircraft
