= The Adversary (Carrère book) =

Novel written by Emmanuel Carrère

The Adversary is a French non-fiction book by Emmanuel Carrère first published in France as L'Adversaire in 2000 by Folio. The book was published in English in 2001 under the title The Adversary: A True Story of Monstrous Deception.

Carrère stated that his work was influenced by Truman Capote's In Cold Blood and he included himself in the narrative as a direct reaction to Capote excising himself from his own work despite his close relationship with the murderers he wrote about.

== Summary ==
On January 9, 1993, Jean-Claude Romand's best friend, Luc Ladmiral, learns that Romand, his wife, and their children have all been involved in a house fire; out of the entire family, only Jean-Claude is alive. At the hospital, police begin to ask a series of odd questions, and Luc learns that they suspect foul play as Romand's wife and children were already dead before the fire started. When Romand's uncle goes with the police to break the news to Romand's parents, they discover them dead, having been shot multiple times. Initially suspecting that the murders had been a coordinated attack on Romand's family on account of his high-profile work with the World Health Organization, police soon came to discover that Romand had never worked for the organization at all, and in fact, Romand had never even graduated from university. Eventually his mistress also steps forward to reveal that earlier in the day he attacked her in the woods, trying to kill her, before she fought him off.

Fascinated by the case, which quickly became a nationwide sensation, author Emmanuel Carrère sends a letter to Romand through his lawyer in 1993 asking to speak with him about writing a non-fiction account of the murders. After months of silence, Carrère decides to channel his energy into a new work loosely inspired by the Romand case called Class Trip and believes he is done with the case. In 1996 Romand finally replies back saying that he had been unable to speak with him earlier on the advice of his lawyer, who counselled him not to make contact with Carrère until the investigation was over. Carrère and Romand begin a correspondence and Carrère becomes an accredited member of the press through Le Nouvel Observateur and begins to write on Romand's trial.

At the trial Carrère learns more about Romand's childhood, including the fact that he was brought up never to lie, but that he was also raised to repress and conceal bad news. Romand insists that his failure to complete his second year of studies at university was a result of him injuring his right wrist. However the incident is unprovable and Carrère believes it is more likely that Romand skipped the exam, depressed after his girlfriend Florence, later his wife, slept with him and then broke up with him. He eventually claimed that he had cancer to explain his scholastic absences to his friends and meanwhile re-enrolled in school and attended classes for over a decade in order to maintain his status as a student without taking any exams.

During the trial, it also revealed that Romand kept the family afloat by taking the retirement money of his parents, uncle and in-laws and claiming to invest it through Swiss Bank accounts. Shortly after his father-in-law decided to withdraw some of the capital in order to buy a Mercedes in 1988, he died after a fall down the stairs when only Romand was in the house. At the trial, Romand maintained that he did not kill his father-in-law, and an inquiry into his death remained inconclusive.

Romand eventually began an affair with a divorced woman he met through his best friend Luc, Corinne. Corinne was not attracted to Romand but was eventually charmed by his pursuit of her and his extravagant gifts towards her. Though Corinne eventually ended their relationship she invested thousands of francs with Romand. Romand, heartbroken by Corinne's rejection of him, told her he had terminal cancer in order to maintain some contact with her. Fearing that Romand would die, leaving her unable to access her investment Corinne asked Romand to return her money to her. Having drained the resources of his parents, in-laws and Corinne, Romand planned a dinner with Corinne and then murdered his wife, his two children and his parents before driving to Paris to see Corinne where he attacked her and tried to strangle her. She was able to fight him off and Romand passed the incident off as a result of the medication he was taking to combat his cancer. That evening, after returning to his home, he poured petrol through his house and set it on fire before drugging himself in a suicide attempt, but was eventually rescued by local firemen.

== Reception ==
The Guardian compared the translated version to "bad Primo Levi." The New York Times gave it a favourable review praising its "highly personal inquiry, written in lucid prose that has been elegantly translated by Linda Coverdale."

== Film ==
The book was adapted into a film of the same name - The Adversary, in 2002. Directed by Nicole Garcia the film starred Daniel Auteuil as a fictionalized version of Romand named Jean-Marc Faure.
