= Mohammed El Alaoui =

Alaouite sharif (born 1974)

Chamberlain of Mohammed VI
- Incumbent
- Assumed office 13 November 2013
- Preceded by: Brahim Frej

Personal details
- Born: July 7, 1974 (age 52) Tangiers, Morocco
- Parents: Moulay Zine El Abidine Alaoui (father); Lalla Oum Kalthum Alaoui (mother)
- Education: Paris Assas University

Mohammed El Alaoui (Arabic: محمد العلوي, born 7 July 1974 in Tangiers) is the current Chamberlain (حاجب) of king Mohammed VI of Morocco. He is reportedly a very close friend of the monarch, in addition to being his distant Alaouite cousin.

== Family ==
Mohammed El Alaoui is the son of Zine El Abidine El Alaoui and Lalla Oum Kalthum Alaoui. His mother Lalla Oum Kalthum is the daughter of Moulay El Hassan ben Al Mehdi, khalif (representative) of Sultan Mohammed V in the Spanish protectorate and Princess Lalla Fatima Zahra El Azizia, the daughter of Sultan Moulay Abdelaziz (r. 1894–1908).

His maternal grandfather (Prince Moulay El Hassan ben El Mehdi) was also the second husband of Princess Lalla Aicha, aunt of Mohammed VI and younger sister of Hassan II. His mother is reportedly very close to Princess Lalla Meryem.

== Life and business activities ==
Mohammed El Alaoui was educated in the Lycée Regnault and got his Baccalauréat in 1993. He obtained in 1999 a Bachelor's degree in international trade from the university of Paris Assas. He is active in business in the real-estate and tourism sectors especially in the city of Tangiers.
