= Hélène Carrère d'Encausse =

French historian (1929–2023)

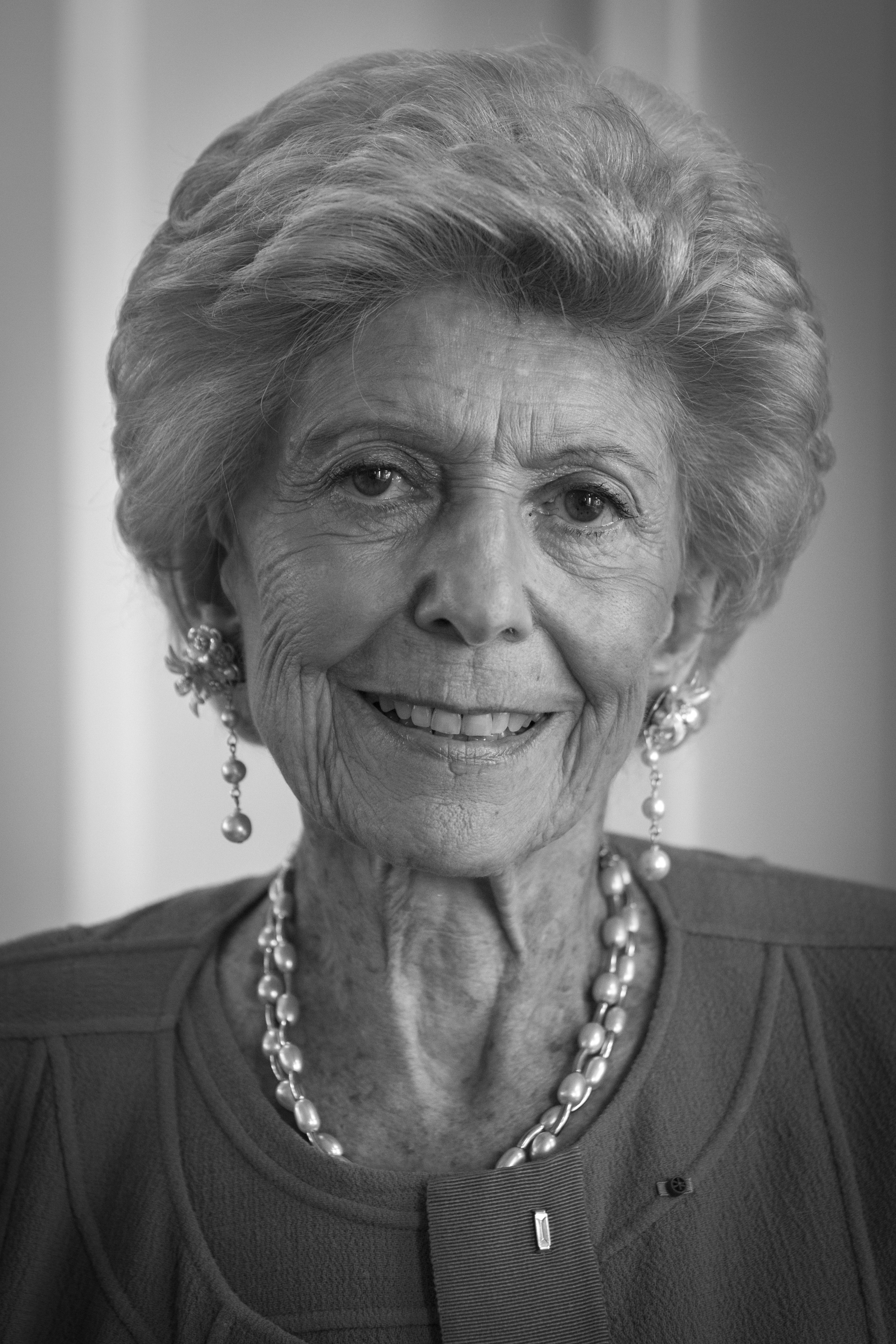
- Carrère d'Encausse in 2013

Member of the European Parliament
- In office 1994–1999

Member of the Académie Française
- In office 1990–2023
- 1999–2023: Perpetual Secretary

Personal details
- Born: Hélène Zourabichvili; 6 July 1929 Paris, France
- Died: 5 August 2023 (aged 94) Paris, France
- Party: Rally for the Republic
- Spouse: Louis Carrère (m. 1952)
- Children: 3, including Emmanuel and Marina
- Parent: Georges Zourabichvili (father)
- Relatives: Niko Nikoladze (great-grandfather); Nicolas Zourabichvili (brother); Salome Zourabichvili (cousin); François Zourabichvili (nephew)
- Education: Sciences Po; Sorbonne (doctorate)
- Profession: Historian
- Awards: Commander of the Order of the Arts and the Letters (1996); Commander of the Order of Cultural Merit (1999); Lomonosov Gold Medal (2008); Order of Honour (2009); Commander's Cross with Star of the Order of Merit of the Republic of Poland (2011); Grand Cross of the Legion of Honour (2011); Princess of Asturias Award (2023)

Academic background
- Doctoral advisor: Maxime Rodinson; Roger Portal

Academic work
- Discipline: History
- Sub-discipline: Modern history; Russian history
- Institutions: Sciences Po; Panthéon-Sorbonne University; College of Europe
- Notable works: Decline of an Empire: The Soviet Socialist Republics in Revolt; Russia Between Two Worlds

Hélène Carrère d'Encausse (French pronunciation: [elɛn kaʁɛːʁ dɑ̃kos]; née Zourabichvili; 6 July 1929 – 5 August 2023) was a French political historian who specialised in Russian history. From 1999 until her death in 2023, she served as the Perpetual Secretary of the Académie Française, to which she was first elected in 1990.

Carrère d'Encausse was a member of the European Parliament between 1994 and 1999, representing the Gaullist-conservative party RPR. She was awarded the Lomonosov Gold Medal and Grand Cross with Star of the Order of Merit of the Republic of Poland in 2008 and 2011, respectively. She was a cousin of Salome Zourabichvili, the current disputed President of Georgia. In 2023 she was awarded the Princess of Asturias Award in Social Sciences.

== Early life, family and education ==
Hélène Zourabichvili was born in the 16th arrondissement of Paris to Georges Zourabichvili, a Georgian immigrant of an educated middle class background, and Nathalie von Pelken, a penniless descendant of Prussian barons and Russian counts. Both parents arrived in Paris in 1925. Her mother had grown up in Tuscany, where the remainder of her Russian family fortune was lost through misinvestment. Of her two maternal great-uncles, the Counts Komarovskii, Viktor was in 1905–1907 the vice-governor of Vyatka, notorious for defenestrating Muslims, and Georgii a veteran of the Second Boer War, Russian invasion of Manchuria and Russo-Japanese War executed in 1920 by the revolutionaries. Hélène's father, son of a Tiflis lawyer and a translator, had fled the Bolshevik takeover of the briefly independent Georgia in 1921 and studied philosophy and political economy in Berlin before re-joining his exiled family in Paris; he spoke five languages, as did his wife-to-be. In contrast to his family's fervent Georgian patriotism, however, he embraced Russian. Both families had been financially affected by the October Revolution, but unlike his brothers, Hélène's father did not have a successful career in France. He worked as a cab driver and a stall trader in provincial towns, while Hélène and her mother lived with distant relatives in Meudon, in an ethnic enclave of white Russian émigrés. By 1936 her father became a salesman at Vilmorin and the family moved to a small flat in Vanves. As a child, Hélène spoke Russian at home and only learned French at age four while on holiday in Brittany with an upper class French acquaintance of the family.

The family moved to Bordeaux in the autumn of 1940, after the defeat of France and the establishment of the Vichy state. Hélène's father worked as an interpreter for the German occupying forces, initially at the car retailer Malleville et Pigeon. After his dismissal in early 1942 he accepted the offer of one Mariaud, a black market dealer who married a Russian émigrée friend of his wife, to assist the German authorities with the confiscation of Jewish property. He became an earnest collaborationiste on account of his anti-Communism and his belief in the rebirth of Europe through the joint forces of Nazism, Fascism and Christianity, influenced by his readings of Henri Béraud, Henri de Kérillis and Abel Bonnard. He would celebrate Christmas in the company of a Nazi officer. After the Liberation of France he shaved his moustache off to avoid recognition. He attended an interrogation with the Deuxième Bureau on 10 September 1944 and discussed the offer of a prison cell as a protection measure. He was abducted and disappeared on the same day. Carrère d'Encausse kept her father's Nazi past a secret and reacted negatively when her son Emmanuel disclosed it in his memoirs against her will.

After completing her secondary education at the 16th arrondissement's Lycée Molière, Hélène studied history at the Institut d'Études Politiques de Paris (Sciences Po), graduating in 1952. She completed her Doctorat de troisième cycle in 1963 and, in 1976, earned a Doctorat ès lettres from Panthéon-Sorbonne University (Paris 1) with a dissertation supervised by Maxime Rodinson and Roger Portal. She lectured in history at both Sciences Po and the Sorbonne.

== Russian scholarship ==
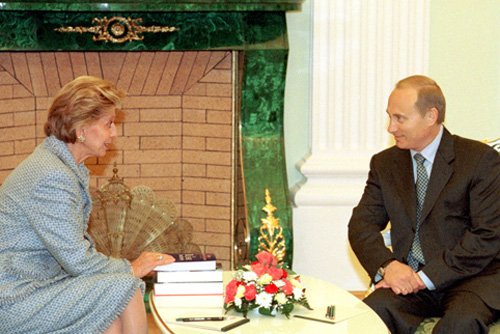
Carrère d'Encausse with Vladimir Putin in October 2000

Due to her interest in her family history, the bulk of Carrère d'Encausse's work focused on Russia and the Soviet Union. She had over two dozen books published in French, many of which have been translated into English. Her 1978 work L'Empire éclaté (English version, Decline of an Empire: The Soviet Socialist Republics in Revolt) predicted that the Soviet Union was destined to break up along the lines of its 15 constituent republics, although she was incorrect in foreseeing that demographic pressures from the Muslim-majority republics of Central Asia would be the trigger.

In commenting on current Russian affairs, Carrère d'Encausse warned against applying Western yardsticks to Russian democracy and said she regretted the excessive demonisation of the government of Vladimir Putin. Up until the final days before Russia's February 2022 invasion of Ukraine she refused to countenance such an eventuality, although her opinion of Putin changed after the start of hostilities. After she died, Putin paid homage to Carrère d'Encausse as "a great friend of our country" and expressed the hope that her legacy would help improve French–Russian relations.

== European and domestic politics ==
In 1992, Carrère d'Encausse was invited by Culture Minister Jack Lang to chair the committee he had founded to promote a "yes" vote in that year's referendum on the Maastricht Treaty, a task that Lang said she performed with "fervour and enthusiasm".

She was elected as a member of the European Parliament in 1994, representing Jacques Chirac's Gaullist-conservative party Rassemblement pour la République (RPR). During her time in the parliament from 1994 to 1999, she sat first with the European Democratic Alliance and later with the Union for Europe group, and she served as one of the vice-chairs of the Committee on Foreign Affairs and as a member of the delegation for relations with Russia.

In 2005, she controversially identified polygamy as one of the causes of France's 2005 civil unrest. During an interview given to the Russian television channel NTV, she claimed: "Why can't their parents buy an apartment? It's clear why. Many of these Africans, I tell you, are polygamous. In an apartment, there are three or four wives and 25 children." She also said that political correctness on French television was "a nightmare" and was almost comparable to media censorship in Russia.

== Académie Française ==
Carrère d'Encausse was elected to seat 14 of the Académie Française on 13 December 1990, then the third woman, and was elected its Perpetual Secretary on 21 October 1999, making her the first woman to hold its top position. Her academician's sword was made by the Franco-Georgian sculptor Goudji.

As a member of the Academy, Carrère d'Encausse opposed both the feminisation of language, insisting that she be styled Madame le secrétaire perpétuel, and gender-inclusive language, describing the use of the interpunct to accommodate both genders (as in les auteur·rice·s) as "stupid" because of its impact on the musicality of a text. Her 2020 ruling that Covid be considered a feminine noun was also fiercely criticised, including by fellow members of the Academy.

== Personal life ==
Born stateless, Hélène Zourabichvili acquired French citizenship in 1950. In 1952 she married Louis Édouard Carrère d'Encausse, with whom she had three children: Emmanuel (born 1957), an author, screenwriter and director; Nathalie (1959), a lawyer; and Marina (1961), a physician and broadcast journalist. Emmanuel's 2025 book Kolkhoze is about his difficult relationship with his mother. Her brother was the composer Nicolas Zourabichvili, and she was a cousin of Salome Zourabichvili, the current President of Georgia.

Carrère d'Encausse died in Paris on 5 August 2023, at age 94. President Emmanuel Macron announced that he would lead a national homage in her honour at the Hôtel des Invalides before the end of the summer.

== Honours and awards ==
=== Honours ===
- Belgium: Commander of the Order of Leopold (Belgium)
- Brazil: Commander of the Order of the Southern Cross
- France: Grand Cross of the Legion of Honour (2011)
- France: Officer of the National Order of Merit
- France: Commander of the Ordre des Palmes académiques
- France: Commander of the Ordre des Arts et des Lettres
- Monaco: Commander of the Order of Cultural Merit (November 1999)
- Poland: Commander's Cross with Star of the Order of Merit of the Republic of Poland
- Russia: Medal of the Order of Honour (Russia)

=== Awards ===
- Princess of Asturias Awards (2023; Spain)
- Grande médaille d'or of the Society for the Encouragement of Progress (2020; France)
- Lomonosov Gold Medal (2008; Russia)
- Ivane Javakhishvili Medal by Tbilisi State University (2003, Georgia)
- Prix du nouveau cercle de l'union (2000; France)
- Prix des Ambassadeurs (1997; France)
- Prize Paulée de Meursault (1995; France)
- Prix Comenius (1992; France)
- Prix Aujourd'hui (1978; France)

=== Honorary degrees ===
- HEC Paris
- Université catholique de Louvain
- Université de Montréal
- Université Laval
- University of Bucharest
- Sofia University
- Saint Joseph University

== Works ==
Carrère d'Encausse's page on the website of the Académie Française provides the following list of her publications.

- 1966: Réforme et révolution chez les musulmans de l'Empire russe (Armand Colin), in English: Islam and the Russian Empire: Reform and Revolution in Central Asia (University of California Press, 1988)
- 1966: Le Marxisme et l'Asie (with Stuart R. Schram), 1853–1964 (Armand Colin)
- 1967: Central Asia, a century of Russian rule, Columbia Univ., réédition 1990 (Duke Univ. publication)
- 1969: L'URSS et la Chine devant la révolution des sociétés pré-industrielles (avec Stuart R. Schram) (Armand Colin)
- 1972: L'Union soviétique de Lénine à Staline (Éd. Richelieu), in English: History of the Soviet Union, 1917–1953. (Longman, New York 1981, 1982)
- 1975: La Politique soviétique au Moyen-Orient, 1955–1975 (Presses de la F.N.S.P.)
- 1978: L'Empire éclaté : la révolte des nations en URSS (Flammarion), in English: Decline of an Empire: The Soviet Socialist Republics in Revolt. (Newsweek Books, New York 1979)
- 1979: Lénine, la Révolution et le Pouvoir (Flammarion), in English: Lenin: Revolution and Power. (Longman 1981)
- 1979: Staline, l'ordre par la terreur (Flammarion), in English: Stalin: Order through Terror. (Longman 1982)
- 1980: Le Pouvoir confisqué (Flammarion), in English: Confiscated Power: How Soviet Russia Really Works. (Harper and Row, New York 1982)
- 1982: Le Grand Frère (Flammarion), in English: Big Brother: The Soviet Union and Soviet Europe. (Holmes and Meier, New York 1987)
- 1985: La déstalinisation commence (Complexe)
- 1986: Ni paix ni guerre (Flammarion)
- 1987: Le Grand Défi (Flammarion), in English: The Great Challenge: Nationalities and the Bolshevik State, 1917–1930. (Holmes and Meier 1992)
- 1988: Le Malheur russe (Fayard), in English: The Russian Syndrome: One Thousand Years of Political Murder (Holmes and Meier 1992)
- 1990: La Gloire des Nations (Fayard), in English: The End of the Soviet Empire: The Triumph of the Nations. (Basic Books, New York 1993)
- 1992: Victorieuse Russie (Fayard)
- 1993: L'URSS, de la Révolution à la mort de Staline (Le Seuil)
- 1996: Nicolas II, La transition interrompue (Fayard)
- 1998: Lénine (Fayard)
- 2000: La Russie inachevée (Fayard)
- 2002: Catherine II (Fayard)
- 2003: L'Impératrice et l'abbé : un duel littéraire inédit (Fayard)
- 2005: L'Empire d'Eurasie (Fayard)
- 2006: La Deuxième Mort de Staline
- 2008: Alexandre II. Le printemps de la Russie (Fayard)
- 2010: La Russie entre deux mondes (Fayard)
- 2011: Des siècles d'immortalité. L'Académie française 1635-.... (Fayard)
- 2013: Les Romanov – Une dynastie sous le règne du sang (Fayard)
- 2015: Six années qui ont changé le monde 1985–1991 – La chute de l'empire soviétique (Fayard)
- 2017: Le général de Gaulle et la Russie (Fayard)
- 2019: La Russie et la France (Fayard)
- 2021: Alexandra Kollontaï. La Walkyrie de la Révolution (Fayard)

== Bibliography ==
- Carrère, Emmanuel (2007), Un roman russe, Paris: P.O.L (fr), ISBN 9782846821827 (English translation: My Life as a Russian Novel: A Memoir, New York: Metropolitan Books, 2010; ISBN 9780805087550)
- Kitson, Simon (2008), The Hunt for Nazi Spies: Fighting Espionage in Vichy France, Chicago: University of Chicago Press, ISBN 978-0-226-43893-1
