= V13 =

V13 may refer to:

- LFG V 13, a biplane
- V13 (book), a 2022 book by Emmanuel Carrère
- Motorola Razr3, a mobile phone
- Project V13, a video game
- Venice 13, a street gang in Los Angeles
- V13, a grade in bouldering
- V13, a personal history of other diseases, in the ICD-9 V codes
- V13 (film), 2025 film directed by Richard Ledes
- V13 Media, a website dedicated to popular music
