= The Man on the Bench in the Barn =

1969 novel by Georges Simenon

- Author: Georges Simenon
- Original title: La Main
- Translator: Moura Budberg
- Language: French
- Genre: Psychological novel
- Published: 1969 Harcourt (US); 1970 Hamish Hamilton (UK)
- Media type: Print
- OCLC: 53533

The Man on the Bench in the Barn is a novel by the Belgian writer Georges Simenon. The original French version La Main ("The Hand") appeared in 1968. The novel is among his romans durs, a term roughly translated as hard, or harrowing, novels; it was used by Simenon for what he regarded as his serious literary works.

In 2016, this novel was reissued in English under the title The Hand, newly translated by Linda Coverdale (ISBN 9780241284650).

The novel is set in Connecticut, USA. Simenon lived in America from 1945 to 1955; from 1950 he lived at Shadow Rock Farm in Lakeville, Connecticut. Unlike his other novels set in America, it was written many years after his return to Europe.

In the novel, a man's life is changed when, instead of looking for his friend lost in a blizzard, he sits on a bench in a barn next to his house and smokes cigarettes; later, he has an affair with his friend's widow, all the while wondering what his wife is thinking about him.

== Summary ==
The narrator is Donald Dodd. In places, including the last few pages, he writes in the present tense.

Donald Dodd is a lawyer in Brentwood, Connecticut; his friend Ray Sanders, whom he has known since they were at Yale University together, is a partner in a public-relations organization in Madison Avenue. Donald and his wife Isabel, and Ray and his wife Mona who are staying with the Dodds, go to a party in January in New York, given by Harold Ashbridge, a business acquaintance. During the party, he aimlessly goes into a room and sees Ray making love with Ashbridge's wife Patricia (unnoticed by Ray).

There is a blizzard on the way back; the car gets stuck in snow about a mile from the Dodds' home Yellow Rock Farm, and they walk the rest of the way. When they get there, Ray is missing. Donald tells the others he will go and look for him; instead, he sits in the barn next to the house and smokes cigarettes, feeling that in doing so he has killed Ray. He wonders whether his attitude to Ray has been envy, admiration or hate.

Later in the house they get some sleep, putting mattresses in front of the fire. "The last thing I remember was Mona's hand on the floor, between our two mattresses, and that hand, as I drifted off to sleep, acquired an incredible meaning." Snowploughs clear the roads, and police, following up Donald's call, come to question him about Ray. When Donald later goes back to the barn, he finds the cigarette butts on the ground are missing, concluding that Isabel must have cleared them away, so that the police, checking Donald's story, would not find them. "She knew. Yet there was no accusation in her blue eyes, no sharpened attitude. Only a slight astonishment and curiosity." Later, Ray's body is found.

At the funeral, Donald stands beside Mona. Back at his office in Brentwood, he wonders if the others are aware he is a different person. He knows that he and Isabel have become strangers.

He goes to New York to deal with Mona's estate. Arriving at her apartment in Sutton Place, Manhattan, they immediately begin a passionate affair. He tells her that at Ashbridges's party he saw Ray and Patricia, and that he didn't look for Ray in the blizzard; she thanks him for being frank, and says she knew about Ray and Patricia.

Between visits to New York, where Mona has moved to a smaller apartment, his family life with Isabel and their daughters Mildred and Cecilia continues. Isabel continues to look at him, and he wonders what her eyes are saying. People in Brentwood know he is having an affair. During one visit to New York, Mona tells him she is going to marry John Falk, a television producer. Donald has settled Mona's estate, and he does not visit her again.

His hatred of Isabel increases, and he finds it difficult to sleep. Finally, he reaches breaking point.

== Adaptations ==
The play The Red Barn, by David Hare, is based on the novel. Its first production, directed by Robert Icke, ran from 6 October 2016 to 17 January 2017 at the Lyttelton Theatre, London; it featured Mark Strong as Donald Dodd, Hope Davis as his wife Ingrid and Elizabeth Debicki as Mona Sanders.
