= Jean-Claude Romand =

French spree killer and impostor (born 1954)

- Born: 11 February 1954 (age 72); Lons-le-Saunier (Jura), France
- Conviction: Murder ×5 (Suspected of a sixth murder)
- Penalty: Life imprisonment plus 22 years lock-in

Details
- Victims: 5–6
- Span of crimes: 23 October 1988 – 10 January 1993
- Country: France
- Date apprehended: January 1993

Notes
- 1996 : condemned to lifetime prison 2019 : parole for 2 years in an abbey 2022 : definitely released, with specific obligations.

Jean-Claude Romand (born 11 February 1954) is a French spree killer and impostor who pretended to be a medical doctor for the World Health Organization for 18 years before killing his wife, children, and parents in January 1993, when he was about to be exposed.

In 1996, Romand was sentenced to life in prison for the 1993 murders. During his imprisonment, he worked to restore audio documents for the INA, and trained other prisoners in audio restoration.

On 28 June 2019, Romand was granted conditional release and was released from prison under electronic monitoring to a Benedictine monastery, the Notre-Dame de Fontgombault abbey, whose monks agreed to receive Romand for two years. Reportedly having become very pious during his time in prison, Romand lived under strict conditions with the monks of the abbey, only being allowed to leave the premises for a few hours a day. Romand participated in the daily life of the 70 monks of the abbey during his time there, working in particular on the agriculture of the few hectares of the abbey estate, and was housed in the hotel section of the abbey.

Romand was released from the monastery in 2022 and is no longer required to wear an ankle bracelet. He lives in hiding in a village in Indre, with a retirement pension of about 800 euros per month. Romand remains obligated to pay reimbursements to his victim and is forbidden to contact the families of the victims, to appear in the media, or to appear in the areas of Auvergne-Rhône-Alpes, Ile-de-France or Bourgogne-Franche-Comté. He is required to inform his judge when moving his residence, or when leaving Indre for a period of over two weeks.

Romand has also been suspected to have played a part in the death of his father-in-law, Pierre Crolet, who fell from a staircase on 23 October 1988. Romand was the only witness to the alleged accident. Romand has always denied being involved in his death.

== Biography ==
Jean-Claude Romand was born on 11 February 1954 in Lons-le-Saunier and grew up in the village Clairvaux-les-Lacs in the department of Jura. He studied at the sixth-form college of Lons-le-Saunier until he completed his secondary education. In 1971, he registered at the preparatory classes of Lycée du Parc in Lyon but dropped out after one term. Afterwards he enrolled as a medical student.

Romand told friends and family that he had passed the first and second year medical examinations in 1975, when in fact he had purposely avoided taking either. He was never qualified as a doctor, which was not known to his parents.

For 18 years, Romand posed as a successful medical professional and researcher in the World Health Organization (WHO). He claimed that he had researched arteriosclerosis and that he had contact with political figures.

In reality, he spent his days wandering and used the free information services of the local WHO building. He would visit the conference rooms and the publications office, taking any papers he could find. Later, his home and car were found to be full of papers that were letter headed by WHO. He lived close by in Prévessin-Moëns. He left for supposed work trips periodically, but traveled only as far as Geneva International Airport and spent a couple of days in a hotel room there, studying medical journals and a travel guide about the various countries he lied about visiting. Romand lived off the money his wife and he had made by selling an apartment, his wife's salary and money given to him by various relatives, who were told that he was investing it in various hedge funds and foreign ventures.

He had previously cheated on his wife, with a divorced child psychologist who lived in Ferney-Voltaire. Romand convinced her to give him 900,000 francs, claiming he would invest it. Instead he embezzled the funds.

Romand had also previously lied to a close friend about a cancer diagnosis. He had told them he was being treated by Léon Schwartzenberg in Paris, but later investigation found that Schwartzenberg had no records related to Romand. Police were unable to find any records of Romand in any oncology department in any other hospital in France.

Jean-Claude Romand was the only witness to the death of his father-in-law, Pierre Crolet, on 23 October 1988. Pierre had a fatal fall on the stairs of his house a few days after asking for reimbursement of part of his financial investment. When the rescuers arrived on the scene they claimed to have heard him stammer: "Jean-Claude m'a, Jean-Claude m'a..." ("Jean-Claude [missing verb]d me") before Jean-Claude intervened to put an oxygen mask on the face of his father-in-law. Pierre died of his injuries a few days later without waking up. The courts ruled it an accident and Romand was not prosecuted, later organizing his father-in-law's funeral and launching a fundraiser. He subsequently diverted all donations.

In 1992, before the Christmas holidays, the president of the local school board attempted to contact Romand. He attempted to find him in the WHO directory but was unable to find any details related to him. He later saw Romand's wife, Florence, and mentioned the incident to her. Florence said she'd speak to her husband about the matter. It is unknown if Florence did speak to her husband about the matter, but a week later she was found dead.

== Actions on the night of the murder ==
On 9 January 1993, Romand withdrew 2,000 francs (equivalent to €301 in 2025) and borrowed a .22 rifle from his father, for which he purchased a suppressor and gas canisters and asked for them to be gift wrapped. That night, according to the authorities, he beat his wife to death on the couple's double bed with a rolling pin. He left her body in bed. The next morning, Saturday, 10 January 1993, he woke his children, had breakfast, and watched cartoons with them. He then made them go back to their beds, where he shot them both in the head. After these killings, the only people who could expose him were his parents and his former mistress, who wanted the 900,000 francs that she had loaned him as a favour back.

Around noon the same day, Romand travelled to his parents' house, where he ate lunch with them. After the meal, he went upstairs with his father, who showed Romand a vent near the floor that needed repairing. When his father bent down to look at the vent, Romand shot him twice in the back. After covering his body with a sheet, Romand shot his mother in the living room, shooting her in the front. He also shot the family dog.

In the evening, he picked up his former mistress, telling her they were invited to a dinner with the then-health minister, Bernard Kouchner. They drove around while Romand pretended he was lost, all before stopping and searching through the car for a piece of paper he supposedly had lost with Kouchner's phone number on it. He claimed he was unable to find it and claimed instead to have found the necklace he had bought as a gift to his former mistress. Romand invited her out of the car, telling her to close her eyes while he put it around her neck. When she did, Romand began spraying tear gas into her face while he shoved a stun wand into her stomach. The woman also believed she had been strangled with a plastic cord. After she pleaded for her life, Romand gave up his attack and drove her the two-hour drive home. During this time, they talked, and Romand blamed his cancer, claiming it was driving him mad. He made her promise never to tell anyone about his attempt to murder her. He then returned to his family home, which still contained the bodies of his dead wife and children.

That night, he sat and watched television before he poured petrol around the house, set it on fire, and took an overdose of sleeping pills. Whether this suicide attempt was genuine is doubtful, since some writers have pointed out that the pills he took were long expired and he had access to more effective barbiturates. Furthermore, he started the fire at 4 o'clock in the morning, right around the time the road cleaners were passing by. They immediately alerted the local firefighters, who arrived in time to rescue Romand.

He survived the blaze but refused to talk to police during subsequent questioning.

== Aftermath ==
Romand's trial for the murder of his family began on 25 June 1996. On 6 July 1996, Romand was found guilty and sentenced to life imprisonment with no possibility of parole for 22 years; he became eligible for parole in 2015. An appeals court in Bourges granted Romand parole in 2019; he had been imprisoned for 26 years. He was released into the custody of a nearby Benedictine monastery and had an electronic bracelet placed on him to ensure he did not try to escape. Romand is reputed to suffer from narcissistic personality disorder.

== Documentary, fiction and scholarship ==
French author Emmanuel Carrère corresponded with Romand during his imprisonment and wrote a book, L'Adversaire (The Adversary), based on the case. Nicole Garcia directed a movie, L'Adversaire (2002), based on the book, and actor Daniel Auteuil played the part of Romand (renamed Jean-Marc Faure in the film).

Two other films were loosely based on Romand's life: the French L'Emploi du temps (2001) (English title: Time Out) and the Spanish La vida de nadie (English title: Nobody's Life).

Romand's deception also formed the basis of the 'Subterraneans' episode of the BBC crime drama Waking The Dead (third episode of the fifth series in 2005). Episode 16 (season 1) 'Phantom' of Law & Order: Criminal Intent is constructed around Romand's story.

Philosopher Jean Baudrillard analyzed Romand's case in his book of essays The Intelligence of Evil or the Lucidity Pact. He describes Romand's secret life not as a dissimulation but as a genuine doubling: "To transfigure insignificance and banality, all that is needed is to turn them into a parallel universe. There is no simulation in all this." He also claims that such a long pretense would be impossible without some kind of complicity: "One can no more explain the silence of those around him than Romand's own silence. The deeper he gets into his stratagem, the deeper the others retreat into their absence of curiosity. It is genuinely a conspiracy."
