= Class Trip =

1998 French film

- Theatrical release poster
- Directed by: Claude Miller
- Written by: Emmanuel Carrère
- Based on: Class Trip by Emmanuel Carrère
- Produced by: Francis Boespflug; Annie Miller
- Starring: Clement Van Den Bergh; Lokman Nalcakan; Yves Verhoeven
- Cinematography: Guillaume Schiffman
- Edited by: Anne Lafarge
- Music by: Henri Texier
- Production company: Les Films de la Boissière
- Distributed by: Warner Bros.
- Release dates: 16 May 1988 (Cannes); 23 September 1998 (France)
- Running time: 96 minutes
- Country: France
- Language: French

Class Trip is a 1998 French drama film by Claude Miller, based on the 1995 novel of the same name by Emmanuel Carrère. Its original French title is La Classe de neige, which is the name given to class trips in the snow. It tells the story of a young boy on a school skiing trip who suffers anxiety attacks that bring on disturbing nightmares.

== Plot ==
The story begins with Nicolas, a shy and introverted ten years old, dreading the school ski trip. Nicolas is worried that he won't fit in with the other boys. His overprotective father decides to drive Nicolas by himself to the ski resort, instead of letting him go on a bus with the rest of the group. En route, Nicolas and his father pass the aftermath of an apparently fatal car accident. Seeing police ahead while the traffic had stopped, Nicolas' father becomes nervous and conceals all loose items within the car in the trunk – and we see that Nicolas' travel bag is next to several matching briefcases. Nicolas subsequently forgets his bag in his father's car, increasing his awkwardness when he shows up for the class trip without any spare clothes or toiletries.

The father does not return to bring Nicolas's bag, and is not reachable when the school staff tries to get in touch with him. Nicolas subsequently has disturbing daydreams about his father having been in a car accident.

During the trip, Nicolas is befriended by Hodkann, another pupil. Nicolas fabricates a story for Hodkann, falsely claiming that his father is a secret agent, and that bad guys are out to get him. He makes Hodkann promise not to tell anyone.

One of Nicolas' main fears is wetting his bed, and the situation gets worse when he gets a bed just above Hodkann, also having borrowed his pyjamas since he didn't have his own. At night, Nicolas tries to stay awake but falls asleep, waking up from a wet dream but believing he has wet his pants. He leaves his bed to clean his clothes and while returning he discovers it is snowing outside. Nicolas goes out into the freezing cold and ends up locked out, and in desperation curls up inside the car of his ski instructor, Patrick. Before he drifts off to sleep he sees a van driving away. He is found in the morning by Patrick and is taken in to a study with a fever.

Later that day, he goes to a café while the other boys are skiing. While in the café, police come looking for René, a young boy who is missing. That night, while sleeping he has a nightmare. He dreams that he is at a theme park with Hodkann and Patrick and that he goes on a giant caterpillar while his little brother is looked after by another seemingly friendly man. Once he is on the caterpillar he sees his brother being walked to a white van by the stranger. Later, the brother is found outside the park after having one of his organs taken.

The dream is poignant because Nicolas, months before, had not been allowed to go on a similar ride because it would have meant leaving his little brother with a stranger. After declining the stranger's offer to watch the brother, Nicolas' father awkwardly warns him against stranger danger, claiming this includes a risk of organ theft. In a series of flashbacks, Nicolas' father shows signs of mental instability: his wrist notably shows a deep scar that indicates a previous suicide attempt.

It is eventually revealed that Nicolas' father was not in a car accident as Nicolas had day dreamed, but rather that he abducted and abused children, likely including the boy the police were looking for, and has been arrested. Hodkann, who broke his promise to Nicolas not to tell anyone about his father supposedly being a secret agent, actually described the father's car to the police when they came to investigate the boy's disappearance, thinking this would help the father escape the "bad guys". Ironically, this helped the police connect the father with the boy's disappearance, and led to his arrest.

The movie ends with Nicolas being driven to his mother's home by Patrick, who has been made aware of the father's arrest, but declines to tell Nicolas about it, simply informing him that something terrible has happened and that it would be best if he would hear the news from his family. During the drive home, newspapers and TV stations are shown reporting on the story, and Patrick awkwardly tries to shield Nicolas from them.

== Cast ==
- Clément van den Bergh as Nicolas
- Lokman Nalcakan as Hodkann
- François Roy as The Father
- Yves Verhoeven as Patrick
- Emmanuelle Bercot as Miss Grimm

== Music ==
"Laguna Veneta" • "Jeudi" • "Indians" • "Samedi soir" • "Don't but ivory anymore" • "Dimanche soir" • "Laguna laita" • "Lundi". Composer - Henri Texier

"Mashala". Composer - Bojan Zulfikarpasic

"La Salsa du demon". "King Kong five". Petite messe solennelle (Rossini). "So tell the girls that I'm back in town" - Jay Jay Johansson.

== Awards ==
The film was entered into the 1998 Cannes Film Festival where it won the Jury Prize.
