= Other Lives But Mine =

2009 book by Emmanuel Carrère

Other Lives but Mine
- Author: Emmanuel Carrère
- Original title: D'autres vies que la mienne
- Translator: Linda Coverdale
- Language: French
- Publisher: P.O.L.
- Publication date: 2009
- Publication place: France
- English publication date: 2011
- Pages: 309
- ISBN: 9782846822503

Other Lives but Mine (French: D'autres vies que la mienne) is a 2009 non-fiction book by the French writer Emmanuel Carrère. It was published as Lives Other Than My Own in the United States. It focuses on Carrère's wife's sister, a judge who died from cancer in 2005.

It was adapted to a screenplay for the 2011 French film All Our Desires.

== See also ==
- 2009 in literature
- Contemporary French literature
