= François Zourabichvili =

French philosopher (1965–2006)

- Born: 28 August 1965; Poitiers, France
- Died: 19 April 2006 (aged 40); Paris, France
- Family: Nicolas Zourabichvili (father); Hélène Carrère d'Encausse (aunt)

Education
- Education: Nancy 2 University

Philosophical work
- Era: 20th-century philosophy
- Region: Western philosophy
- School: Continental philosophy
- Institutions: University of Montpellier III
- Main interests: Aesthetics

François Zourabichvili (Georgian: ფრანსუა ზურაბიშვილი; 28 August 1965 – 19 April 2006) was a French philosopher who specialized in the works of Gilles Deleuze and Baruch Spinoza.

== Biography ==
François Zourabichvili was the son of composer Nicolas Zourabichvili, nephew of historian Hélène Carrère d'Encausse, and cousin of author Emmanuel Carrère. He became agrégé in 1989 and earned his PhD in Philosophy in 1999. He taught at a lycée already from 1988 to 2001, was docent at University of Montpellier III, and a director at the Collège international de philosophie from 1998 to 2004. He committed suicide in 2006 and is buried in the Russian Church of the Holy Trinity in the 16th arrondissement of Paris.

A year after Zourabichvili's death, the Collège international de philosophie and the École normale supérieure organized a colloquium upon Les physiques de la pensée selon François Zourabichvili ("The physics of thinking according to François Zourabichvili") led by Bruno Clément and Frédéric Worms. The event took place with the participation of Pierre Macherey, Pierre-François Moreau, Pierre Zaoui, Paola Marrati, Paul R. Patton, Paolo Godani and Marie-France Badie.

== Work ==
François Zourabichvili worked primarily on the concepts of "event" and "littéralité", inspired by the philosophy of Deleuze.

In addition, he wrote about aesthetics, a discipline in which he centered his interest for the purpose of finding relations between art and game. He published some articles about the films of Boris Barnet and Dziga Vertov.

== Partial bibliography ==
- La philosophie de Deleuze. Quadrige (P.U.F.): Manuel. with Paola Marrati, Anne Sauvagnargues. Editor P.U.F.
- La littéralité et autres essais sur l'art. Lignes d'art. Con Anne Sauvagnargues. Editor P.U.F.
- Leibniz et la barbarie. Editor Champ Vallon, 2005
- Spinoza. Une physique de la pensée, Paris, P.U.F., 2002
- Le conservatisme paradoxal de Spinoza. Enfance et royauté, Paris, P.U.F.
- Le vocabulaire de Deleuze, Paris, Ellipses, « Vocabulaire de... », 2003
- La philosophie de l'événement. París: PUF, 1994
