= I Am Alive and You Are Dead (book) =

1993 biography of Philip K. Dick

- Original French language book cover for Je suis vivant et vous êtes morts. Philip K. Dick 1928–1982 (1993)
- Author: Emmanuel Carrère
- Original title: Je suis vivant et vous êtes morts
- Translator: Timothy Bent
- Language: French
- Subject: Philip K. Dick
- Genre: "imaginative biography"
- Publisher: Éditions du Seuil
- Publication date: 1993
- Publication place: France
- English publication date: 2004
- Pages: 358
- ISBN: 9782020201735

I Am Alive and You Are Dead: A Journey into the Mind of Philip K. Dick (French: Je suis vivant et vous êtes morts. Philip K. Dick 1928–1982) is a 1993 biography of the American science fiction writer Philip K. Dick, written by the Frenchman Emmanuel Carrère.

== Synopsis ==
Emmanuel Carrère describes the book as his depiction of "the life of Philip K. Dick from the inside, in other words, with the same freedom and empathy—indeed with the same truth—with which he depicted his own characters".

== Reception ==
In Le Monde, Geneviève Brisac called it "one most moving and funniest books of this autumn". Charles Taylor of The New York Times wrote that the book "reads like a hyperadolescent spouting forth trippy what-ifs" and reduces "Dick's writing to bubble-gum Pirandello, or Borges rejiggered for Saturday afternoon movie serials". Sean O'Hagan of The Observer wrote that Carrère has omitted typical features of an authoritative biography, such as an index, footnotes and quotations from interviews. O'Hagan wrote that the book "appears almost novelistic" because of its focus on Dick's inner life and richness in anecdotes, and that Carrère seems to want to present Dick's life as Dick himself experienced it, calling the book an "intriguing read" and "as good a place as any to start trying to understand the enigma of Philip K Dick".
