= Kolkhoze =

2025 book by Emmanuel Carrère

- Author: Emmanuel Carrère
- Language: French
- Publisher: Éditions P.O.L
- Publication date: 28 August 2025
- Publication place: France
- Pages: 560
- ISBN: 978-2-8180-6198-5

Kolkhoze (French pronunciation: [kɔl.koz]; lit. 'kolkhoz') is a 2025 book by the French writer Emmanuel Carrère. It is about his mother, the historian Hélène Carrère d'Encausse (1929–2023), his difficult relationship with her, and how their bond has influenced his writing and personality. The main themes of the book are death, love and writing. Éditions P.O.L published the book in French on 28 August 2025.

The book received the Prix Médicis.
