= Marina Carrère d'Encausse =

French physician and author

- Born: 9 October 1961 (age 64); Paris, France
- Occupations: Journalist; TV host
- Employer: France Télévisions
- Family: Hélène Carrère d'Encausse (mother); Emmanuel Carrère (brother)

Marina Carrère d'Encausse (born 9 October 1961) is a French doctor, author, TV host and broadcaster. She was born in 1962 in Paris. She co-hosts the programme Le Magazine de la santé on France 5 since 2000 with Michel Cymes.

She is the author of books such as Une femme blessée (2014) and Une femme entre deux mondes (2017) published by Anne Carrière. Les Enfants du secret is her third novel.
