= The Sand Child =

1985 novel by Tahar Ben Jelloun

- 1985 French edition
- Author: Tahar Ben Jelloun
- Original title: L'Enfant de sable
- Translator: Alan Sheridan
- Language: French
- Genre: Novel
- Publisher: Éditions du Seuil (French); Harcourt
- Publication date: 1985
- Publication place: Morocco
- Media type: Print (Hardback & Paperback)
- ISBN: 0-15-179287-9 (hardback edition) ISBN 978-0-8018-6441-4 (paperback edition)
- OCLC: 15428839
- Dewey Decimal: 843 19
- LC Class: PQ3989.2.J4 E613 1987

The Sand Child (l'Enfant de sable) is a 1985 novel by Moroccan author Tahar Ben Jelloun. First published in France, the novel's message expresses, on multiple levels, ideas about the post-colonial condition of Morocco, while also emphasising themes relating to the construction of individual identities. It can also be seen as a critique of "traditional" Islamic and Moroccan morals, with specific reference to the position of women. There are strong elements of magical realism in the novel.

Ben Jelloun continued the story of Mohammed Ahmed/Zahra in his award-winning 1987 novel, The Sacred Night.

== Plot ==
The book is a lyrical account of the life of Mohammed Ahmed, the eighth daughter of Hajji Ahmed Suleyman. Frustrated by his failure to bring a son into the world, Ahmed's father is determined that his youngest daughter will be raised as a boy, with all the rights and privileges that go along with it. The first part of the book describes the father's efforts to thwart suspicion that his child is a boy, especially from his jealous brothers, who look to inherit Ahmed's fortune. Using bribery and deceit, the masquerade succeeds. Mohammed Ahmed is circumcised (blood is drawn from her imaginary penis when Hajji Ahmed (Father) intentionally cuts his finger over the child during the ceremony), his breasts are bound, and he even marries his cousin Fatima, a sickly epileptic girl, who dies young. Only the father, the mother, and the midwife are ever aware of the hoax that is being perpetrated.

The story is told by a wandering storyteller, who reveals the tale, bit by bit, to an enthusiastic—though sometimes skeptical—audience. To verify his story, the storyteller claims to quote from a journal that Mohammed Ahmed kept, revealing his innermost thoughts about his confused gender identity. Mohammed Ahmed also reveals himself through correspondence with a mysterious friend, who writes him letters challenging his identity.

The book changes direction after Fatima's death and the disappearance of the storyteller, forced away by the modernization of the country. The remainder of the journal has been lost, but some of the crowd that once listened to the storyteller continues to meet and share how they see the story ending. Each of them describes Mohammed Ahmed's transition back to womanhood, where she assumes the identity of Zahra. Their stories have different endings, some happy, others tragic, until a blind troubador, a fictionalised version of Jorge Luis Borges, continues the tale leading up to Mohammed Ahmed/Zahra's death.

== Characters ==
Ahmed: The main character. An eighth child who was born a female, but was raised and presented to the society as a male. It is "his" story that is being told and "his" journal that is being read to the audience.

Story teller/narrator: multiple, with varying connection to Ahmed, character(s) as well as narrator(s)

Malika: She is the loyal female housekeeper/maid of the house. She is discreet, gentle and "never asked questions".

Ahmed's mother: She is the mother of Ahmed and 7 other daughters. She is obedient and subservient to her husband.

Ahmed's father: He is the father of Ahmed. He is traditional, desperately wants a son to continue his lineage and inheritance. He blames his wife, whom he physically abuses, for not giving him a son. He is the person who decides Ahmed, his last born daughter, to be raised as a male.

Fatima: She is Ahmed's cousin. She is born with a limp and is epileptic, and has always been treated as a failure by her family and the society. She is taken by Ahmed as his wife and is used to cover up "his" secret. She dies early in life.

Um Abbas: female, leader of a circus, takes Ahmed in

Lalla Zahra: Ahmed's female persona (98).

Salem: 1st of the three alternate end storytellers, black son of slave.

Amar: 2nd of the three alternate end storytellers. He is a retired school teacher and says that he has salvaged the manuscript.

Fatuma: Last of the three alternate end storytellers. An old woman, literate, comes from family that was happy to have daughters, has no children or a husband.

== Themes ==
=== The story-teller and the story ===
L'Enfant de Sable incorporates traditional Arabic and oral story-telling strategies to form a frame-story. The character who tells the story of Ahmed is an eccentric character, who is often doubted by his marketplace audiences. This approach to story-telling may be indicative of the author's own love for Arabic cultural traditions and appreciation of the story as the most important cultural dimension. The surreal characteristics of the story-teller character also plays a major role in other thematic categories (most importantly those of deceit and surrealism). The scenes in which the story-teller is doubted are moments in which the reader may realize the credibility of the narrator; the scenes in which the story-teller uses abstract images and language suggest the intrinsic nature of the story as the reader understands it.

=== Deceits, mysteries, and partitions ===
There are many cases in the novel when characters attempt to hide parts of themselves or others; the story is inherently embedded in a sort of mystery. The first chapter describes Ahmed as isolating himself, between Ahmed's father and his daughters "was a wall", and festivities are held in the name of lies.

The novel on the whole is about this mystery—this deceit. Ahmed's father hides the truth about his "son", Ahmed's mother binds his chest as to avoid breast growth, and so on.

=== Bodily harm ===
Often in this novel a character will cause harm to a body, whether it be to themselves or to others. Before Ahmed is born, much harm is caused to the body of the mother in order to prevent another daughter. When Ahmed is to be circumcised, his father spills his own blood to hide the truth. There is an instant in the book when Ahmed's mother is said to be growing tired of her own daughters and strikes "her belly to punish herself."

=== Surrealism and abstraction ===
The Sand Child can be read as a work of surrealism or of magical realism. Blogger Amy Owen describe the "dream-like states, hallucinations, and allusions to Andre Breton and the exquisite corpse [as giving] Ben Jelloun’s work a magical intoxicated quality." The narrator and even Ahmed himself often use surrealistic imagery and abstract language as forms of expression.

=== Gender ambiguity ===
The questions of gender ambiguity is perhaps the most essential. Ahmed's male gender is a reflection of his parents' desire for a male child. As Ahmed matures, he begins to identify as a woman named Zahra. The different endings of the story differ as to the character's end gender. These depictions of gender serve as Ben Jelloun's literary investigation into views of gender, and especially a certain prioritization of the male, in early 20th century Morocco.

== Narrative strategies ==
In The Sand Child, there are two major narrative strategies. One of the major narrative strategies is the use of a frame story, a story in a story, which gives a perspective of the narrator and his thoughts while also giving the reader a questionable story that may reflect the questioning of the narrator. Another narrative strategy is the first person journal entries. In these, the reader gets a first person account of what Ahmed is trying to say, and what they're thinking. The fact that the story is written in third person while the journals are in first person shows the importance of the “story inside of a story” framework. This type of writing allows readers two different perspectives and a chance to reflect and make their own choices about how to understand the "truth" of the story.

== Cultural and historical context ==
The Sand Child is set in early 20th-century Morocco and challenges Moroccan culture as well as, more subtly, the French occupation of Morocco. In particular, the treatment of women in Morocco comes under scrutiny. While the story is set in the 1950s, it responds in many ways to the treatment of women since the 1960s, when Hassan II took rule over Morocco. In 1956, King Mohammed V first claimed independence for Morocco from France and was known as a fairly forward ruler. Then, in 1961, Hassan took over and reinstated deeply conservative traditions in the period known as “The year of the Iron Fist”. This period was marked by violence against women and girls. Much has changed since Mohammed VI took over in 1999. The Sand Child takes as its focus the belief that male children (Ahmed) in early-to mid-20th-century Moroccan culture were more valuable than female children. This is seen throughout the novel as Ahmed acknowledges the special privileges of males, specifically that of being able to attend Quranic school. Ben Jelloun was praised for his critique of gender roles in Morocco by women’s groups.
