= The Adversary (film) =

- Film poster
- Directed by: Nicole Garcia
- Written by: Frederic Belier-Garcia; Jacques Fieschi, from the book by Emmanuel Carrère
- Produced by: Alain Sarde
- Starring: Daniel Auteuil; Géraldine Pailhas
- Cinematography: Jean-Marc Fabre
- Edited by: Emmanuelle Castro
- Music by: Angelo Badalamenti
- Distributed by: BAC Films
- Release date: 28 August 2002
- Running time: 130 minutes
- Country: France
- Language: French
- Box office: $5.7 million

The Adversary (French: L'Adversaire) is a 2002 French drama film directed by Nicole Garcia, starring Daniel Auteuil and Géraldine Pailhas.

== Plot ==
The film is based on the 2000 book of the same name by Emmanuel Carrère which is inspired by the real-life story of Jean-Claude Romand. L'Adversaire's protagonist Jean-Marc Faure (Auteuil) pursues an imaginary career as a doctor of medicine in a plot more closely based on Romand's life and Carrère's book than was Laurent Cantet's 2001 film L'Emploi du Temps.

== Cast ==
- Daniel Auteuil as Jean-Marc Faure
- Géraldine Pailhas as Christine Faure
- François Cluzet as Luc
- Emmanuelle Devos as Marianne
- Alice Fauvet as Alice
- Martin Jobert as Vincent
- Michel Cassagne as Jean-Marc's father
- Joséphine Derenne as Jean-Marc's mother
- Anne Loiret as Cécile
- Olivier Cruveiller as Jean-Jacques
- Nadine Alari as Christine's mother
- Nicolas Abraham as Xavier
- Bernard Fresson as Christine's father
- François Berléand as Rémi
- Sibylle Blanc as waitress
- Anne Benoît

== Accolades ==
The film was nominated for a Palme d'Or at the 2002 Cannes Film Festival. At the César Awards 2003 Auteuil was nominated as Best actor, François Cluzet as Best supporting actor and Emmanuelle Devos as Best supporting actress.
