= All Our Desires =

2011 film

- Film poster
- Directed by: Philippe Lioret
- Screenplay by: Emmanuel Carrère; Philippe Lioret
- Based on: Other Lives But Mine by Emmanuel Carrère
- Produced by: Marielle Duigou; Philippe Lioret; Christophe Rossignon; Stéphane Célérier
- Starring: Vincent Lindon; Marie Gillain
- Cinematography: Gilles Henry
- Edited by: Andrea Sedlácková
- Music by: Flemming Nordkrog
- Distributed by: Mars Distribution
- Release dates: 3 September 2011 (Venice); 9 November 2011 (France)
- Running time: 120 minutes
- Country: France
- Language: French
- Budget: €8.5 million
- Box office: $2.6 million

All Our Desires (French: Toutes nos envies) is a 2011 French drama film directed by Philippe Lioret. Marie Gillain was nominated for the Magritte Award for Best Actress for her role. The screenplay was adapted loosely from the 2009 French non-fiction book Other Lives But Mine.

== Synopsis ==
In Lyon, Claire (Marie Gillain) is a young magistrate confronted with people in debt, in particular with a young woman, Céline (Amandine Dewasmes), whom she tries to help. During a hospital examination, Claire learns that she has an incurable brain tumor (glioblastoma) and that she has little time to live. At the same time, she meets Stéphane (Vincent Lindon), a more experienced colleague, and together they seek a legal loophole against the credit agencies.

== Cast ==
- Vincent Lindon as Stéphane
- Marie Gillain as Claire Conti
- Amandine Dewasmes as Céline
- Yannick Renier as Christophe (as Yannick Rénier)
- Pascale Arbillot as Marthe
- Laure Duthilleul as Carole
- Isabelle Renauld as Doctor Hadji
- Emmanuel Courcol as Doctor Stroesser
- Eric Godon as Gallois

== Accolades ==
Award / Film Festival	Category	Recipients and nominees	Result
César Award	Best Actress	Marie Gillain	Nominated
Globes de Cristal Award	Best Actress	Marie Gillain	Nominated
Magritte Award	Best Actress	Marie Gillain	Nominated
Venice Film Festival	Venice Days Award		Nominated
