= The Kingdom (Carrère novel) =

2014 novel by Emmanuel Carrère

- Author: Emmanuel Carrère
- Original title: Le Royaume
- Translator: John Lambert
- Language: French
- Subject: Early Christianity
- Publisher: Éditions P.O.L
- Publication date: 2014
- Publication place: France
- English publication date: 2017
- Pages: 640
- ISBN: 978-2-8180-2118-7

The Kingdom (French: Le Royaume) is a 2014 novel by the French writer Emmanuel Carrère.

== Plot ==
Set toward the end of the 1st century, the story follows Luke and other members of a marginal and apocalyptic Jewish sect. Luke gets to know Paul, investigates the group's executed founder and ends up writing the Acts of the Apostles, the Gospel of Luke and most of the Catholic epistles.

== Reception ==
Tim Whitmarsh wrote in The Guardian that the book is scandalous, not for its treatment of sexual themes or use of Biblical scholarship, but for the "relentless narcissism" Carrère shows when he uses early Christianity as a parable for his own life as an author. Whitmarsh called it a "complex, intellectual but compelling book" that also contains wit, self-criticism and humility. Michael Sonnenschein of Bookforum called it "a weird, brilliant hybrid of biblical interpretation, memoir, and historical fiction in which Carrère scrutinizes his own wavering Catholic faith", writing that it is brash in parts, but because of that participates in a long tradition of Christian spiritual memoirs "in a wildly contemporary, self-conscious way". The book was also reviewed in The Irish Times and The Financial Times.

== See also ==
- Authorship of Luke–Acts
