= Francis Boespflug =

French film producer

- Born: 1 September 1948; Strasbourg, France
- Died: 6 November 2018 (aged 70); Paris, France
- Occupation: Movie producer

Francis Boespflug (1 September 1948 – 6 November 2018) was a French film producer.

== Biography ==
Born in Strasbourg, Boespflug studied law there. He met his future wife, Fabienne Vonier, at the independent cinema Le Club, which was owned by Louis Malle. In the early 1980s, he worked alongside producer Jack Gajos to set up l'Agence Pour le Développement Régional du Cinéma (the Agency for the Development of Regional Cinema).

In 1989, Boespflug, along with Louis and Vincent Malle, and his wife Fabienne, founded the cinematic production and distribution company Pyramide. Pyramide would aid the productions of many directors, including Youssef Chahine, Alain Resnais, and Denys Arcand. In 1992, he left Pyramide and began working at Gaumont, while Fabienne took over management of Pyramide. In 1997, Boespflug became hired as head of the French subsidiary of Warner Bros.

At Warner Bros., Boespflug produced many French versions of American movies, including La Classe de Neige (Class Trip), La Vérité si je mens 2 (Would I Lie to You? 2), Un long dimanche de fiançailles (A Very Long Engagement), and Coco avant Chanel (Coco Before Chanel).

In 2009, Boespflug left Warner Bros. and went back to Gaumont as an advisor. On the side, he created his own company, FB Productions, in 2011.

Following Fabienne Vonier's death in 2013, Boespflug returned as head of Pyramide.

Francis Boespflug died on 6 November 2018 in Paris.
