= Gothic Romance (novel) =

1984 novel by Emmanuel Carrère

Gothic Romance (French: Bravoure) is a 1984 novel by the French writer Emmanuel Carrère. It is about the writing of the 1818 novel Frankenstein; or, The Modern Prometheus and focuses on John William Polidori, Lord Byron's personal physician, who is embittered and claims that Mary Shelley stole his ideas. It was Carrère's second novel.

The book was published in French by Éditions P.O.L in 1984 and in English translation in 1990. Publishers Weekly called it "allusive and contrived" and wrote that it "will appeal most to readers concerned with narrative as a puzzle and a process".
