= Tahar Ben Jelloun =

Moroccan writer (born 1944)

- الطاهر بن جلون
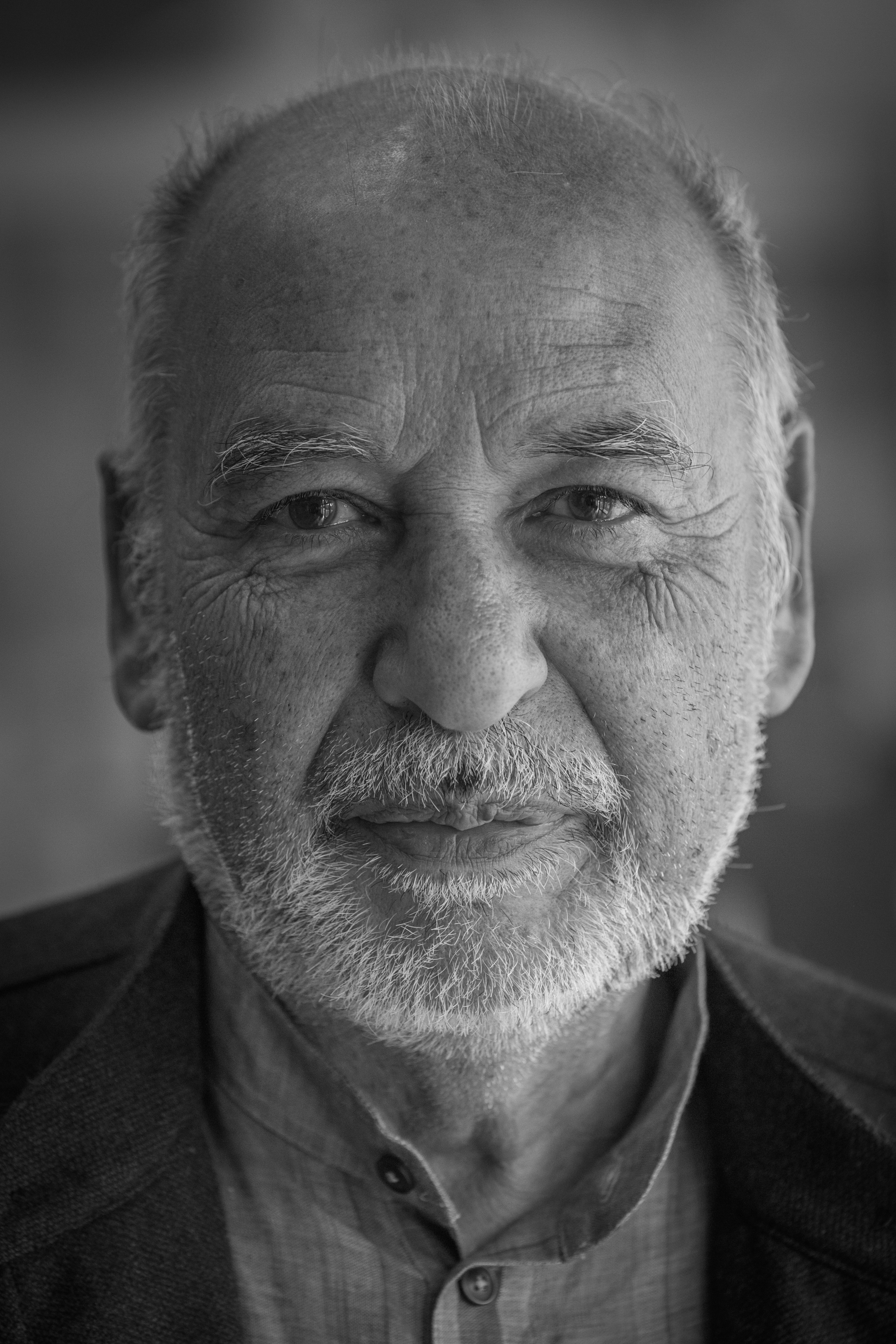
- Tahar Ben Jelloun in 2013
- Born: 1 December 1944 (age 81); Fes, French Morocco
- Education: Lycée Regnault; Mohammed V University
- Occupations: Novelist, poet
- Writing career
- Language: French
- Period: 1973–present
- Notable works: The Sand Child; This Blinding Absence of Light
- Notable awards: Prix Goncourt (1987); Prix Ulysse (2005)
- Website: taharbenjelloun.org

Tahar Ben Jelloun (Arabic: الطاهر بن جلون, romanized: aṭ-Ṭāhir bin Jallūn; born 1 December 1944) is a Moroccan writer who rose to fame for his 1985 novel L'Enfant de sable (The Sand Child). Although his first language is Darija, his works are written in French. He has been nominated for the Nobel Prize in Literature.

== Early life and career ==
Tahar Ben Jelloun was born in Fes, Morocco, on 1 December 1944. As a child, he attended an Arabic-French bilingual elementary school. He then studied in the Lycée Regnault in Tangier, Morocco, until he was 18 years old. He studied philosophy at Mohammed V University in Rabat.

After he was a professor of philosophy in Morocco, he joined the group that ran the literary magazine Souffles in the mid-1960s, and he wrote many pieces for the cultural magazine. He later participated in the student rebellion against the repressive and violent acts of the Moroccan police. In 1966, he was forced into military service as his punishment.

Five years later, his first poems were published in Hommes sous linceul de silence (1971). Shortly thereafter he moved to Paris to study psychology, and in 1972 began writing for Le Monde. He received his doctorate in social psychiatry in 1975.

In January 2003, Ben Jelloun was nominated one of the two candidates for the 16th seat of the Académie Française, the moderating body of the French language. This seat was last held by Léopold Sédar Senghor. A month later, Ben Jelloun ended his campaign for the position.

Today, Ben Jelloun is known for his literary career but also his appearances on French media outlets in which he speaks about the experiences of people of North African descent living in France. He lives in Paris and continues to write.

== Writing career ==
Ben Jelloun's 1985 novel L’Enfant de Sable (translated as The Sand Child) brought widespread attention. In 1987, he received the Prix Goncourt for his novel La Nuit Sacrée (The Sacred Night), which made him the first Maghreb author to receive the award.

His 1996 novel Les raisins de la galère (The Fruits of Hard Work) is a reflection on racism and traditional Muslim ideas about a woman's place. The protagonist, Nadia (a young French woman of Algerian origin), fights racism and exclusion to find her place in French society.

In 1993, he received the journalistic award Golden Doves for Peace, issued by the Italian Research Center Archivio Disarmo. Ben Jelloun was awarded the International Dublin Literary Award for Cette aveuglante absence de lumière (This Blinding Absence of Light) in 2004. In 2005 he received the Prix Ulysse for the entire body of his work.

Ben Jelloun has written several pedagogical works. His first is Le Racisme expliqué à ma fille, translated as Racism Explained to My Daughter (1998). The text is an educative tool for children and is the main reason for him being regularly invited to speak at schools and universities. His text is addressed to his own daughter, but he is actually writing to all French children who are troubled by complex but important topics that surround racism. He argues that the primary solution to solve racism in France is through education, specifically education starting at a young age. He also makes the connection between colonialism and racism in a way that is understandable to his young audience by explaining that colonialism is a type of domination and power that aids racism to exist at the state level.

He also has written L'Islam expliqué aux enfants, translated as Islam Explained (2002), and Le Terrorisme expliqué à nos enfants, translated as On Terrorism (2016) in response to the 1990s protests against French immigration laws, the Islamophobia following the September 11 attacks in the United States, and the November 2015 Paris attacks, respectively.

In September 2006, Ben Jelloun was awarded a special prize for "peace and friendship between people" at the Lazio between Europe and the Mediterranean Festival. On 1 February 2008, Nicolas Sarkozy awarded him the Cross of Officer of the Légion d'honneur.

In Africa, his novel Le mariage de plaisir was shortlisted for the GPLA 2016 (Belles-Lettres Category).

== Tributes ==
The asteroid (29449) Tahar benjelloun was named in his honour.

== Selected works ==
- Hommes sous linceul de silence (1971)
- Harrouda (1973)
- Solitaire (1976)
- French Hospitality (1984)
- The Sand Child (1985)
- The Sacred Night (1987)
- Silent Day in Tangiers (1990)
- With Downcast Eyes (1991)
- State of Absence (1992)
- Corruption (1995)
- The Fruits of Hard Work (1996)
- Praise of Friendship (1996)
- L'Auberge des pauvres (1997)
- Racism Explained to My Daughter (1998)
- This Blinding Absence of Light (2000)
- Islam Explained (2002)
- Amours sorcières (2003)
- La Belle au bois dormant (2004)
- The Last Friend (2006)
- Yemma (2007)
- Leaving Tangier (2009)
- The Rising of the Ashes (2009)
- A Palace in the Old Village (2010)
- Par le feu (2011, Éditions Gallimard) published in English (2016, Northwestern University Press) as By Fire: Writings on the Arab Spring
- Le Bonheur conjugal (2012, Éditions Gallimard) published in English (2016, Melville House) as The Happy Marriage
- L'Ablation (2014)
- Le mariage du plaisir (2016, Éditions Gallimard), shortlisted for the Grand Prix of Literary Associations 2016 (Belles-Lettres Category). Published in English (June 2021, Northwestern University Press) as The Pleasure Marriage
