= Runaway (book) =

2004 book of short stories by Alice Munro

- Author: Alice Munro
- Language: English
- Genre: General Fiction
- Publisher: McClelland and Stewart (First edition), Alfred A. Knopf (First American edition), Vintage (American paperback edition)
- Publication date: 2004
- Publication place: Canada
- Media type: Print
- Pages: 335 (First edition), 352
- ISBN: 0-7710-6506-X (First edition), 1-4000-4281-X (First American edition)
- OCLC: 54692750
- Preceded by: Vintage Munro
- Followed by: The View from Castle Rock

Runaway is a book of short stories by Alice Munro. First published in 2004 by McClelland and Stewart, it was awarded that year's Giller Prize and Rogers Writers' Trust Fiction Prize.

== Contents ==
There are eight short stories in the book. Three of the stories ("Chance", "Soon", and "Silence") are about a single character named "Juliet Henderson".

- "Runaway" – a woman is trapped in a bad marriage.
- "Chance" – Juliet takes a train trip which leads to an affair.
- "Soon" – Juliet visits her parents with her child Penelope.
- "Silence" – Juliet hopes for news from her adult estranged daughter Penelope.
- "Passion" – A lonely small town girl flees a passionless relationship with an outsider.
- "Trespasses" – Lauren, a young girl, meets an older woman, Delphine, who is too interested in her.
- "Tricks" – Robin, a lonely girl, lives life alone due to bad luck and misinterpretation.
- "Powers" – See below

=== Runaway ===
"Runaway" is the first of the eight short stories in the collection. The main character, Carla, is stuck in an abusive relationship with her husband, Clark. Carla's desire to run away is mainly portrayed through their pet goat named Flora, which escapes the farm at the beginning of the story. Carla’s fascination with running away is also shown through her interest with mobile homes and in a flashback to when she left her family to live with Clark.

Clark is depicted to be manipulative and controlling. An example of this can be seen when they find out that Mr Jamieson had died. Clark expresses his fantasy of making up a story about Mr Jamieson raping Carla and then blackmailing his wife into paying Clark to keep it a secret.

When the character, Sylvia, returns from Greece, she calls Clark to ask for Carla to help clean up the house. After Clark emotionally manipulates Carla into accepting the request, she goes to help Sylvia at her house. During this time helping Sylvia, Carla confesses that she wishes to run away from Clark. Sylvia sympathises with Clara and proposes a plan to escape to Toronto. When Carla begins to follow through with the plan, once she is on the bus, she begins to get cold feet. She worries that she still loves Clark and depends too much on him.

After returning home, Clark goes to visit Sylvia to confront her on trying to help Carla run away. During this visit, the goat that ran away, Flora, approaches them. When Clark returns home, he never told Carla that he found the goat. However she did find out when she received a letter from Sylvia stating that the goat came back.

The story ends after Carla came across some bones in a field that were hinted at to be Flora's bones. Suggesting that if Carla tried to run away again, Clark would kill her.

=== Powers ===
"Powers," the eighth and final story in the collection, is divided into five parts. The first part comprises the diaries of Nancy, a self-centered young woman convinced that she is destined to have some great importance. She startles the town doctor, Wilf, on April Fool's Day by pretending to have an illness; when she later tries to apologize to him, he unexpectedly proposes to her. Nancy, ashamed of her conduct, accepts his proposal although she feels little affection for him. She expresses surprise that her life has proved so mundane after all.

The second part shifts into third-person narration and takes place several months after the first part. Nancy and Wilf are engaged and preparing for their wedding. Wilf's cousin Ollie is in town to attend the ceremony, and Nancy becomes fascinated by his worldly affectations. In an attempt to impress him, she takes Ollie to visit Tessa, a friend of hers that lives on the outskirts of town. Tessa has psychic abilities that allow her to see through objects; she correctly identifies all of the items in Ollie's pockets. Ollie seemingly dismisses her, but Nancy fears that he is hiding a deeper interest. She writes Tessa, warning her to avoid Ollie. Tessa responds, revealing that she and Ollie have already eloped to the United States. They intend to get married and test her abilities scientifically.

The third part leaps forward into the 1960s. Nancy is now an aging woman visiting an American mental hospital. The facility is shutting down, but she has received a letter asking that she retrieve Tessa, who has lived there for some time. Nancy has no intention of doing so, and she arranges with the management to leave alone after she has spoken with Tessa. When the two former friends meet, Nancy attempts to learn about Ollie and his life with Tessa. Tessa, however, cannot remember anything; electroshock therapy has ruined her memory. She claims that someone may have strangled Ollie, but she recalls nothing else. Tessa then guesses that Nancy plans to abandon her at the facility. Feeling guilty, Nancy promises to write her after she leaves, although she never does.

The fourth part moves forward a few more years. Wilf has died from the complications of a stroke, and Nancy takes the opportunity to travel. She is in a large city when she randomly encounters Ollie. She and Ollie have a long discussion, in which he discusses his travels with Tessa in the United States. He says that funding for research disappeared after World War II, forcing him and Tessa to work on the vaudeville circuit. The strain of performing gave Tessa horrible headaches and gradually eroded her powers, but she and he developed an intricate system with which to deceive their audiences. Eventually, Ollie says, Tessa died. Nancy does not contradict him. He drives her back to her hotel, and she opens her mouth to invite him up. Before she speaks, however, Ollie refuses. Nancy resolves to find Tessa and bring her to Ollie. She does not succeed.

The fifth part takes place decades later. Nancy has become an elderly woman whose children worry that she is living in the past. She falls asleep and dreams about Tessa and Ollie. They are staying at a motel; Tessa suffers from a terrible headache. In her mind, Tessa suddenly sees a pyramid of flies hidden behind the curtain. Excited that her powers have returned, she awakens Ollie, and they embrace. Ollie, however, worries that Tessa can sense the papers in his front pocket, which will commit her to a mental hospital. It is implied that Tessa does sense their presence. Nevertheless, she no longer cares what happens to her. Nancy then dreams that Ollie decides to spare Tessa. As she does so, a feeling of reprieve lights up her dream. Nancy is pulled out of it as her consciousness disintegrates around her.

== In popular culture ==
The second, third and fourth stories in the book – "Chance", "Soon" and "Silence" – provided the basis for Pedro Almodóvar's screenplay for his 2016 film adaptation, Julieta.
