= A Russian Novel =

2007 book by Emmanuel Carrère

- Author: Emmanuel Carrère
- Original title: Un roman russe
- Translator: Linda Coverdale
- Language: French
- Subject: Emmanuel Carrère
- Publisher: Éditions P.O.L
- Publication date: March 2007
- Publication place: France
- English publication date: 3 August 2010
- Pages: 368
- ISBN: 978-2-84682-182-7

A Russian Novel (French: Un roman russe), published as My Life as a Russian Novel in the United States, is a 2007 book by the French writer Emmanuel Carrère. It is about Carrère's life in 2000–2002, including his love life, a visit to Russia where he made the film Back to Kotelnich, and research into his grandfather's life. Although heavily autobiographical, the book was labelled as a work of fiction by Carrère and the publisher.
