= Anne Sauvagnargues =

French philosopher (born 1961)

Anne Sauvagnargues (born 16 March 1961) is a French philosopher specializing in the work of Gilles Deleuze.

== Biography ==
A former student of the École Normale Supérieure in Fontenay-aux-Roses, she taught at the École normale supérieure of Lyon and has been professor at the University Paris X since 2010,

She co-heads with Fabienne Brugère the series "Art Line" for the University Press of France.

== Bibliography ==
- In English:
1. Sauvagnargues, Anne (2013) Deleuze and Art, Trans. by Samantha Bankston. London: A & C Black.
2. Sauvagnargues, Anne (2015) Artmachines: Deleuze, Guattari, Simondon Trans. by Suzanne Verderber. Edinburgh: Edinburgh University Press.
- In French:
1. Maudits mot. Se parler, Paris, Le Seuil, coll. " Philo ", 1996 en littérature, ISBN 2-02-025821-8
2. La Nature, avec Yue Dai Yun, Paris, Éditions Desclée de Brouwer, coll. " Proches lointains ", 1999 en littérature ISBN 2-220-04404-1
3. " Deleuze, de l'animal à l'art ", dans La philosophie de Deleuze, avec François Zourabichvili et Paola Marrati, Paris, Presses universitaires de France, coll. " Quadrige. Manuels ", 2004 en littérature, ISBN 2-13-054738-9
4. Deleuze et l'art, Paris, PUF, coll. " Lignes d'art ", 2005 en littérature, ISBN 2-13-055289-7
5. Comme des bêtes : Ours, chat, cochon et Cie, avec Bernard Fibicher, Magali Moulinier, Marie Alamir, Milan, Italie, 5 Continents Éditions, 2008 en littérature, ISBN 978-88-7439-458-6
6. Deleuze, l'empirisme transcendantal, Paris, PUF, coll. " Philosophie d'aujourd'hui ", 2010 en littérature, ISBN 978-2-13-056708-0

== See also ==
- Levi Bryant
