= Racism Explained to My Daughter =

1998 book by tahar Ben Jelloun

- First edition (French)
- Author: Tahar Ben Jelloun
- Original title: Le racisme expliqué à ma fille
- Language: French
- Genre: Dialogue
- Published: Éditions du Seuil 1998; The New Press 1999
- Publication place: Morocco
- Media type: Print
- Pages: 207
- ISBN: 156584534X

Racism Explained to My Daughter (by Tahar Ben Jelloun, 1998, ISBN 88-7754-206-3) is a book in which the author, during a demonstration against an immigration law in Paris, answers his daughter's questions about the reasons for racism.

The author's intent was to explain, with this book, the modern "trauma" that racism is to children and to help adults answer their children's questions on racism. He says that children are more likely to understand that one isn't born racist, but becomes one. Adults are not likely to change their ideas. The author writes this after going to a demonstration in France against bans on immigration where his then ten-year-old daughter tries to comprehend what they are fighting for and what racism is, who is racist, how one becomes racist, if she is in fact also racist.

In many ways, Racism Explained to My Daughter can be seen as an anti-colonialist text that is comprehensible and straightforward to children. Since Ben Jelloun finds education to be the key component in ending racism, he deliberately educates the youth by defining terms in an accessible and understandable way to his young audience. Some of these key terms include racism, racist, colonialism and anti-Semitism. He is aware that this is a lot of dense and overwhelming material, so he encourages his audience of children to recognize and learn from their mistakes.

== Scientific racism ==
Ben Jelloun directly disputes prevailing ideas of scientific racism. While explaining the nuances of racism to his daughter, Ben Jelloun explains that racism cannot be supported by science. He asserts that throughout history, people have attempted to use history as justification for racism and all other forms of discrimination. To the question asked by his daughter, “What do racists use as their scientific proof?” he responds that there is no scientific proof for racism. He adds that in the realm of the animal kingdom, there are different types of animals with differences from one species to another, but that there are even considerable differences between animals of the same species (for example, in dogs, a German shepherd and a Chihuahua). This diversity, he claims, creates a scientific basis for distinguishing “races.”

Ben Jelloun answers that some racists believe that others believe that one race is inferior to another, and that historically, white people have imposed this idea of inferiority onto people of other races. Ben Jelloun explains that in creating these racial distinctions, the racist shows that he does not believe a multiracial, politically and socioeconomically equal society beneficial for the advancement of humanity.
