= Yves Verhoeven =

French actor (born 1961)

- Born: 27 October 1961 (age 64); Ferrières-en-Bray, France
- Occupation: Actor
- Years active: 1989-present

Yves Verhoeven (born 27 October 1961) is a French actor. He has appeared in more than eighty films since 1989.

== Notable Filmography ==
Film
Year	Title	Role	Notes
2009	Bellamy	Alain	
2009	I'm Glad My Mother Is Alive	Yves Jouvet	
2007	The Key	Pujol	
2007	A Secret	Guillaume	
2002	A Private Affair	Monsieur Pujol	
2001	Alias Betty	Martinaud	
1998	Class Trip	Patrick	
1997	The Swindle	Pickpocket	
1997	The Chambermaid on the Titanic	Gaspard	
1992	Betty	Philippe	
1991	Madame Bovary	Justin	
