= Lazio between Europe and the Mediterranean Festival =

Lazio between Europe and the Mediterranean is a cultural festival held annually in Rome, Lazio, Italy. The first edition of the festival is held between September 21 and October 14, 2006.

According to "Lazio Culture council" the purpose of the festival is to promote dialogue and communication exchange between Mediterranean countries and cultures. The festival is organized under the patronage of Italian President Giorgio Napolitano and with the participation of the Italian Ministry of Foreign Affairs.

== Awards ==
The 2006 special prize for "peace and friendship between peoples" was awarded to Moroccan francophone author Tahar Ben Jelloun.
