= Yoga (book) =

2020 book by Emmanuel Carrère

- 2022 English language translated edition
- Author: Emmanuel Carrère
- Translator: John Lambert
- Language: French
- Publisher: Éditions P.O.L
- Publication date: September 2020
- Publication place: France
- English publication date: 2 August 2022
- Pages: 400
- ISBN: 978-2-8180-5138-2

Yoga is a book written by the French writer Emmanuel Carrère, first published in 2020.

== Synopsis ==
The book begins as a personal essay about self-help, yoga and meditation retreats, but becomes an account of a period of depression and personal breakdown in the life of Emmanuel Carrère, triggered by the 2015 Charlie Hebdo shooting and involving the collapse of his marriage. He is committed to a psychiatric hospital, diagnosed with bipolar disorder and given ketamine and electroconvulsive therapy. Once he is out, he tries to find peace and occupy himself by travelling to Iraq to search for a Quran supposedly written with the blood of Saddam Hussein and to the island of Leros in Greece, where he tries to teach creative writing to newly arrived Asian men during the 2015 European migrant crisis.

== Reception ==
Rob Doyle of The Observer called Carrère "a great pornographer of his own torments" and his books "wantonly self-referential", and wrote that despite the disparate material that Yoga contains, Carrière turns it into an insightful story.

Upon the French publication, the book created discussions as Carrère's ex-wife Hélène Devynck accused him of violating a legal agreement to not write about her in his books. This led to discussions about how much the content in Yoga diverged from Carrère's real experiences due to all instances where he had removed material about his marriage. Randy Rosenthal of the Los Angeles Times wrote that the omissions leave "a black hole" at the book's centre that becomes "an unforgivable flaw".
