= This Blinding Absence of Light =

2001 novel by Tahar Ben Jelloun

- 2001 French edition
- Author: Tahar Ben Jelloun
- Original title: Cette aveuglante absence de lumière
- Translator: Linda Coverdale
- Language: French
- Publisher: Éditions du Seuil
- Publication date: 2001
- Publication place: France
- English publication date: 2002
- Pages: 228
- ISBN: 2-02-041777-4

This Blinding Absence of Light (French: Cette aveuglante absence de lumière) is a 2001 novel by the Moroccan writer Tahar Ben Jelloun, translated from French by Linda Coverdale. Its narrative is based on the testimony of a former inmate at Tazmamart, a Moroccan secret prison for political prisoners, with extremely harsh conditions.

== Plot ==
The plot is based around the events following the second failed coup d'etat against the late Hassan II of Morocco in August 1972. The protagonist is a prisoner in Tazmamart, who, despite being a fictional character, is based on accounts of the prisoners who survived their incarceration there.

The plot focuses on how prisoners who were kept in the extremely harsh conditions of Tazmamart survived, through religious devotion, imagination and communication. The prisoners spent their sentences in cells that are described as being only 5 ft (1.5 m) in height and 10 ft (3.0 m) long. The prisoners in the novel are not actively tortured, but are fed poorly and live without light.

== Reception ==
Maureen Freely reviewed the book for The Guardian, and wrote that "it defies any expectations you might have built up from [knowing about Tazmamart]. It refuses the well-meaning but tired and ultimately dehumanising conventions of human rights horror journalism; it is not a political tract.... Although it is technically a novel, it is a novel stripped, like its subject, of all life's comforts." Freely wrote about the main character that "there is something Beckettian about his limited environment and studied hopelessness", and compared his literary voice to "the language of Islamic mysticism". Freely ended the review: "It is, despite its dark materials, a joy to read."

The novel received the International Dublin Literary Award in 2004.

== See also ==
- 2000 in literature
- Moroccan literature
