= Molyda Szymusiak =

- Born: Buth Keo; October 19, 1962 (age 63); Phnom Penh, Cambodia
- Occupations: Author, photographer

Molyda Szymusiak (born Buth Keo; October 19, 1962) is a Khmer author and photographer born in Phnom Penh, Cambodia. Following the Khmer Rouge takeover in April 1975, she and her family were driven out of the capital city into the Cambodian countryside. Nearly all of her immediate family was massacred or starved in the famine that accompanied the ensuing genocide. She and three other members of the family survived, arriving at the Khao-I-Dang refugee camp on the Thai border in 1980. In 1981, she and two of her cousins were adopted in Paris by Jan Szymusiak, a French professor and theologian of Polish extraction, and Carmen Affholder. In 1984, she published a memoir on the Khmer Rouge years, originally written in French (Les Pierres Crieront), then translated into English and published under the title The Stones Cry Out. The book is important as one of the few first hand survival narratives of the obscure Pol Pot years of 1975–1979 in Cambodia.
