= Class Trip (novel) =

Novel by Emmanuel Carrère

- Author: Emmanuel Carrère
- Original title: La Classe de neige
- Translator: Linda Coverdale
- Language: French
- Publisher: Éditions P.O.L
- Publication date: 1995
- Publication place: France
- English publication date: 1997
- Pages: 176
- ISBN: 978-2-86744-477-7

Class Trip (French: La Classe de neige) is a 1995 novel by the French writer Emmanuel Carrère. It takes place during a school ski trip where a 10-year-old boy has feverish anxiety about the organ thieves his father has warned him about. It was published in English in 1997.

The book was awarded the Prix Femina.

It was adapted into the film Class Trip which won the Jury Prize at the 1998 Cannes Film Festival.
