= The Moustache =

Novel by Emmanuel Carrère

- Author: Emmanuel Carrère
- Language: French
- Publisher: Éditions Gallimard
- Publication date: 1986
- Publication place: France
- Pages: 182

The Moustache (French: La Moustache), or The Mustache in the United States, is a 1986 novel by French writer Emmanuel Carrère.

== Plot ==
In Paris, a man shaves off his moustache for the first time in ten years. He is baffled when his wife reacts by insisting that he never had a moustache. His world begins to crumble when she denies the existence of several people he knows and claims his father is dead.

== Reception ==
Publishers Weekly called the book "a tense, piercing reminder that a fine and shifting line distinguishes fact from mirage" and "a keen example of how readers are necessary captives of a narrator's perspective, no matter how skewed or surreal".

== Film adaptation ==
The novel serves as the basis for the 2005 film The Moustache, directed by Carrère and starring Vincent Lindon.
