= Back to Kotelnich =

2003 French documentary film

- Directed by: Emmanuel Carrère
- Written by: Emmanuel Carrère
- Produced by: Anne-Dominique Toussaint
- Cinematography: Philippe Lagnier
- Edited by: Camille Cote
- Music by: Nicolas Zourabichvili
- Production company: Les Films des Tournelles; Roissy Films
- Release dates: 2003 (Venice); 25 February 2004
- Running time: 105 minutes
- Country: France
- Language: French

Back to Kotelnich (French: Retour à Kotelnitch) is a 2003 French documentary film directed by Emmanuel Carrère. It is based on three visits Carrère made to the Russian town Kotelnich during a period of two years, from which he tells stories about the 20th century and his own family. Carrère was already an established writer and Back to Kotelnich was his debut as a film director.

The film premiered at the 2003 Venice International Film Festival and was released in France on 25 February 2004. Variety called it "a dreadfully self-indulgent, meandering 'personal essay'" and wrote that "only artscasters who breathe the most rarefied air will want to touch this docu with a 10-foot pole".
