= V13 (book) =

2022 book by Emmanuel Carrère

- Author: Emmanuel Carrère
- Language: French
- Subject: November 2015 Paris attacks
- Publisher: Éditions P.O.L
- Publication date: August 2022
- Publication place: France
- Pages: 368
- ISBN: 978-2-8180-5606-6

V13 is a 2022 book by the French writer Emmanuel Carrère. It is about the November 2015 Paris attacks, known as V13 in France because they took place on Friday (vendredi) the 13th. Carrère attended the trial of the perpetrators and covers this in the book.

The book was awarded the Prix Aujourd'hui in 2022 and the Strega European Prize in 2023.
