= The Moustache (film) =

- The official theatrical poster from The Cinema Guild
- Directed by: Emmanuel Carrère
- Written by: Jérôme Beaujour (writer); Emmanuel Carrère (screenplay)
- Based on: The Moustache by Emmanuel Carrère
- Produced by: Anne-Dominique Toussaint
- Starring: Vincent Lindon
- Cinematography: Patrick Blossier
- Edited by: Camille Cotte
- Music by: Philip Glass
- Distributed by: Pathé
- Release date: 2005
- Running time: 87 min
- Country: France
- Language: French / English / Cantonese
- Budget: $5.1 million
- Box office: $5.6 million

The Moustache (French: La Moustache) is a French film from 2005, directed by Emmanuel Carrère and starring Vincent Lindon, and adapted from Carrère's own 1986 novel The Moustache. The film features music from a violin concerto by Philip Glass. The film was awarded the Label Europa Cinemas prize at the 2005 Cannes Film Festival and is currently distributed theatrically in the United States by the Cinema Guild with a DVD release handled by Koch-Lorber Films.

== Plot ==
Marc Thiriez, a middle aged Parisian, asks his wife if he should shave off the moustache he has sported for most of his adult life. His wife, Agnès, wryly comments that she wouldn't recognize him without it, yet as she leaves, Marc shaves the moustache off. Upon her return, Agnès is angry Marc did not let her in the door when she rang; Marc lies and says he broke his shoelace. Marc attempts to surprise her with his clean-shaven face, but gets no reaction. In the car on the way to a party, Marc asks Agnès if she notices anything, but she changes the subject. They visit their friends Serge (Agnès' ex) and Nadia. Serge tells a story about Agnès: during their relationship, she was sneaky but refused to admit her guilt even when everyone was certain she was at fault. Agnès again denies that she lied. Frustrated that Serge and Nadia also do not notice his shaven moustache, Marc fights with Agnès in the car as they return home, frightening her. As they lie in bed that night, another fight ensues as Agnès tells Marc he's never had a moustache and that she fears for his sanity. Agnès phones Nadia, who claims Marc has not had a moustache in fifteen years, but Marc insists she told their friends to ignore his mustache. Agnès takes a sleeping pill.

Marc finds a photo album of pictures from their holiday in Bali, all of which show him sporting his moustache. When he confronts Agnès with these pictures, she ignores him and changes the subject, leaving him even more confused. Marc grows more paranoid and confused when even his co-workers don't acknowledge that he has shaven his moustache. Marc digs through the trash to find his moustache hairs, scaring Agnès. She suggests Marc see a psychiatrist whom her friend François knew. Agnès insists on buying Marc a brightly patterned jacket ("a clown's jacket" as Marc describes it).

As Marc gets his photograph taken for his work badge, he asks a woman if she notices a difference between the photograph that was just taken and his photograph which appears on his I.D. card. She remarks on his moustache, and Marc asks her several times to confirm that he has a moustache in the photograph.

Marc checks his answering machine to find a message from his father. Agnès' friend Bruno calls and Marc tells him to stop kidding him about his moustache. Bruno assures Marc that Marc has not had a moustache in fifteen years. Marc hangs up on him. In the kitchen, he tells Agnès to call his parents and tell them that he won't be able to come to their house for dinner the next day. Agnès calls Marc's mother, but gently reminds Marc that his father is dead and has been so for a year. Confused, Marc speaks of their best friends Serge and Nadia, to which Agnès replies that she doesn't know who they are and that Marc must be delusional. Very upset and questioning his grip on sanity, Marc goes to bed, and Agnès gives him a sleeping pill.

Marc awakes to hear Agnès and Bruno planning to have Marc committed to a psychiatric hospital. Marc quickly dresses and flees the house. In a taxi, he attempts to find his mother, yet due to the sleeping pill and the heavy rain, he cannot find the house in which he grew up. Marc tries to call his mother, but the number he dials is not a valid phone number. He calls Agnès, tells her he is at his mother's, and asks her to pick him up. When Marc sees Agnès and Bruno leave his apartment, he rushes inside, grabs his passport, puts on shoes, breaks his shoelace and leaves. He flees to Hong Kong, the first available flight out of Paris. His passport photo sports a moustache.

Marc journeys through Hong Kong. He writes a postcard to apologize to Agnès but does not send it. As he is about to board a plane back to France, he changes his mind and spends a day traveling back and forth on the Star Ferry. After the ferry stops for the night, he pays local sailors to take him with them on their boat. Marc arrives at an unspecified village in China. Marc stays at a hotel there for a period of time, becoming known with the locals, and regrows his moustache.

Marc arrives back at the hotel one day to find Agnès awaiting him, as though she has been with him the entire trip, to his shock and confusion. Agnès makes fun of his brightly patterned "clown" jacket and asks him why he bought it, hoping he will not wear it in Paris. They go out to a casino and meet new friends that Agnès knows but Marc does not. Marc is shown recent photos of the four of them in which Marc has a moustache. Agnès notices Marc's irritation and says if he doesn't like their new friends they don't have to ever see them again when they get back to Paris. Marc throws away the postcard he wrote in Hong Kong.

Back at the hotel, Agnès suggests that Marc shave his moustache so she can see him without it at least once. He does so, and Agnès comments upon how good he looks without it.

== Production notes ==
The Hong Kong village scenes were filmed in Ko Lau Wan, Sai Kung Peninsula, Hong Kong.

La Moustache captures an element of suspense, though the actions and plot are ambiguous. Many critics have said that the film's events are not literal, but metaphorical and are symbolic of Marc's loss of identity (or of a possible mid-life crisis). Whether the final scene was meant to be what really happened or was just an idealised dream of what Marc wished had happened is unspecified.

== Cast ==
- Vincent Lindon – Marc Thiriez
- Emmanuelle Devos – Agnès Thiriez
- Mathieu Amalric – Serge Schaeffer
- Hippolyte Girardot – Bruno
- Cylia Malki – Samira
- Macha Polikarpova – Nadia Schaeffer
- Fantine Camus – Lara Schaeffer
- Denis Ménochet – The server
- Frédéric Imberty – Café manager
- Brigitte Bémol – Policewoman

== Reception ==
On review aggregator website Rotten Tomatoes, the film holds an approval rating of 86% based on 43 reviews, with an average rating of 7.5/10.
