= Lycée Regnault =

French international school in Tangier, Morocco

Coordinates: 35.7775°N 5.8086°W

Lycée Regnault is a French international school in Tangier, Morocco, serving levels collège (junior high school) and lycée (senior high school/sixth form college). The school, first established in 1913, is the oldest French school in Morocco.

It is directly operated by the Agency for French Education Abroad (AEFE), an agency of the French government.
