= Emmanuel Carrère =

French author, screenwriter and film director (born 1957)

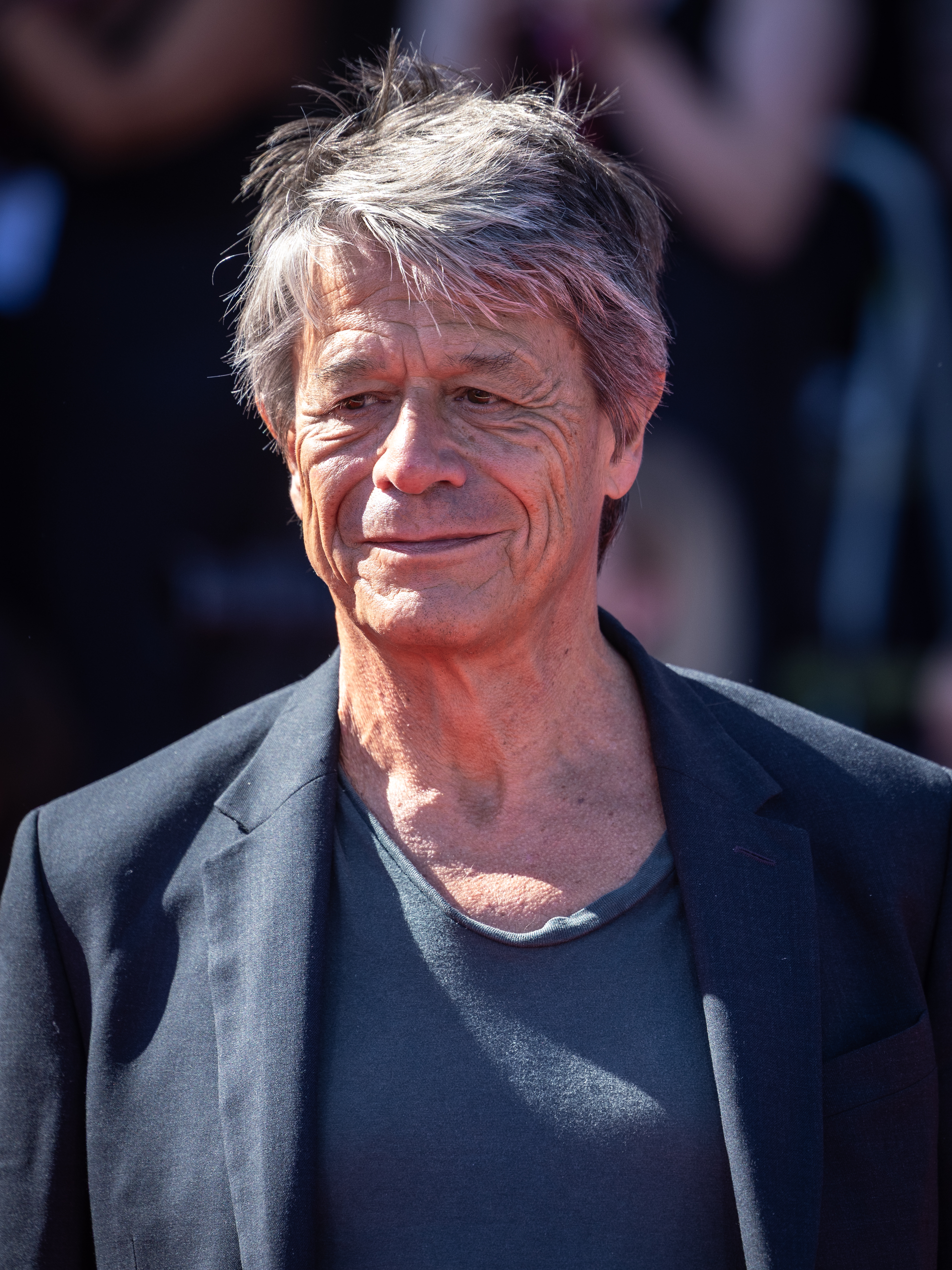
- Carrère in 2025
- Born: 9 December 1957 (age 68); Paris, France
- Education: Institut d'Études Politiques de Paris
- Occupation: Writer
- Spouse: Hélène Devynck (2011–2020)
- Relatives: Hélène Carrère d'Encausse (mother); Marina Carrère d'Encausse (sister)
- Writing career
- Language: French
- Notable works: The Adversary; Other Lives But Mine; Limonov
- Notable awards: Prix Renaudot; Prix Femina; Grand Prix de littérature Henri Gal de l'Académie française; Princess of Asturias Award

Emmanuel Carrère (French: [emanɥɛl kaʁɛʁ]; born 9 December 1957) is a French author, screenwriter and film director.

== Life ==
=== Family ===
Carrère was born into a wealthy family in the 16th arrondissement of Paris. His father, Louis Carrère d'Encausse, (Note: The family name was Carrère, to which Louis added d'Encausse, from his mother's name of Dencausse.) is a retired insurance executive and his mother, historian Hélène Carrère d'Encausse (born Hélène Zourabichvili, the daughter of Georgian émigrés), was a member and perpetual secretary of the Académie française and former member of the European Parliament. She was a cousin of Georgian President Salome Zourabichvili. Carrère has two sisters: Nathalie, a lawyer, and Marina, a doctor, TV presenter and novelist. He is the nephew of composer Nicolas Zourabichvili and cousin of philosopher François Zourabichvili.

=== Studies ===
Carrère studied at the Lycée Janson-de-Sailly and Sciences Po (the Paris Institute of Political Studies).

=== Career ===
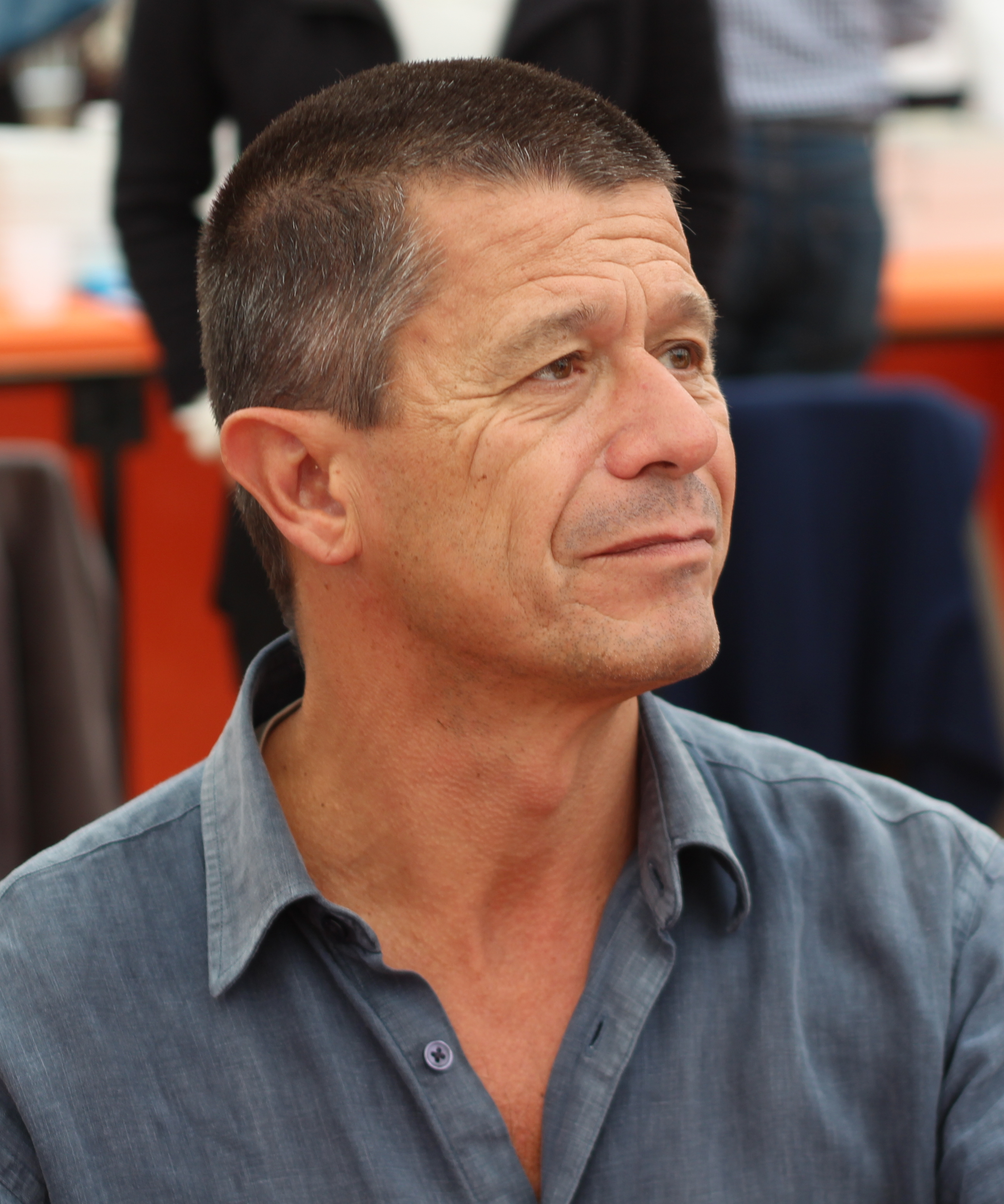
Emmanuel Carrère, in 2014.

As an alternative to military service, Carrère taught French for two years in Surabaya in Indonesia. He then became a film critic for the magazines Télérama and Positif. In 1982 his first book, a monograph on the film director Werner Herzog, was published. The following year saw the publication of his first novel L'amie du jaguar, in which he drew on his experiences in Indonesia. His second novel, Bravoure, based on the story of Mary Shelley, Percy Bysshe Shelley, Lord Byron, John Polidori and their stay at Lake Geneva in the summer of 1816, was published in 1984. Both Carrère's first and second novels won literary prizes (the 1984 Prix Passion and 1985 Prix littéraire de la Vocation respectively), but it was his third novel, The Moustache, published in 1986, that introduced the author to a wider readership. Carrère later adapted the book for a film, which he also directed and which won the Label Europa Cinemas prize at the 2005 Cannes Film Festival. An essay in which Carrère explores alternative history, Le détroit de Behring: introduction à l'uchronie, was also published in 1986. In 1988 Carrère published Hors d'atteinte, a novel about a woman who leaves her life to chance. His next work, published in 1993, was Je suis vivant et vous êtes morts, a fictionalised biography of the American science fiction writer Philip K. Dick. This was followed by a novel, Class Trip, which won the 1995 Prix Femina and was adapted into a film by Claude Miller.

After the publication of Class Trip, Carrère turned his attention to the case of the murderer Jean-Claude Romand. He corresponded with him in jail and attended his trial. L'Adversaire, published in 2000, became a bestseller in France and was translated into 23 languages. It was adapted into the film of the same name by director Nicole Garcia. In 2007, Carrère published A Russian Novel about a visit to Russia and his Russian roots. In the book he revealed that his maternal grandfather had worked as a translator for the occupying German forces in World War II and had disappeared in 1944, presumably killed by members of the French Resistance.

Carrère was on holiday in Sri Lanka when the Indian Ocean tsunami struck. He was in his hotel and not in any personal danger but used the experience as the inspiration for his next book, D'autres vies que la mienne, published in 2009. Carrère was a member of the International jury at the 2010 Cannes Film Festival, was a member of the jury for the Cinéfoundation and Short Films sections of the 2012 Cannes Film Festival, and served on the Jury for the Main Competition at the 2015 Venice Film Festival, chaired by Alfonso Cuarón. In 2011, he published Limonov, a biographical novel about the Russian writer and political dissident Eduard Limonov.

The Kingdom, a novel about the rise of early Christianity, was published in 2014. The book provoked a scandal at the Franciscan University of Steubenville and the head of the English Department, who had included the book in the syllabus for an advanced seminar, was removed from his post. In 2016 Carrère published a collection of his journalism, Il est avantageux d'avoir où aller. An edition published in English in 2019 with the title 97,196 Words: Essays includes an article on Emmanuel Macron written in 2017 for The Guardian. In his 2020 book Yoga, Carrère writes about his experience of depression and four months spent in the Sainte-Anne Hospital in Paris, where he was diagnosed as bipolar and treated with ketamine, electroconvulsive therapy and lithium.

From September 2021 to June 2022 Carrère followed the trial of the November 2015 Paris attacks. His weekly articles were published in L'Obs in France, El País in Spain, la Repubblica in Italy and Le Temps in Switzerland. In September 2022 his articles, with additional material, were published in the form of a book with the title V13. (In France the trial is known as V13 as the attacks took place on Friday (French: vendredi) the 13th.) He was awarded the 2022 Prix Aujourd'hui for the book.

=== Personal life ===
Carrère has been married twice and has a daughter and two sons.

== Style ==
Carrère's work ranges freely between genres and is concerned with the themes of identity, illusion and reality. His prose has been described as "spare and supple".

== Awards ==
- 1984: Prix Passion
- 1985: Prix littéraire de la vocation
- 1987: Grand Prix de l'imaginaire – Prix spécial
- 1988: Prix Charles-Oulmont
- 1988: Prix Kléber-Haedens
- 1995: Prix Femina
- 2007: Prix Duménil
- 2009: Prix Marie-Claire; prix Crésus
- 2010: Grand prix de littérature Henri-Gal from the Académie française
- 2011: Prix Renaudot; Prix de la langue française
- 2012: Premio Malaparte
- 2014: Prix littéraire du Monde; "Meilleur livre de l'année", awarded by Lire
- 2015: Mondello Prize
- 2016: Tomasi di Lampedusa Literary Prize
- 2017: Prix FIL de littérature en langues romanes.
- 2018: Prix de la Bibliothèque nationale de France (BnF)
- 2019: Premio Hemingway
- 2021: Princess of Asturias Award for Literature; Visions du Réel Honorary Award; Taobuk Award for Literary Excellence; Premio Napoli
- 2022: Prix Aujourd'hui
- 2025: Prix Médicis

== Bibliography ==
- Werner Herzog (1982)
- L'Amie du jaguar (The Jaguar's Friend) (1983)
- Bravoure (1984) (translated as Gothic Romance, 1990)
- Le Détroit de Behring (The Behring Strait) (1984) (German: Kleopatras Nase. Kleine Geschichte der Uchronie. Gatza, Berlin 1993.)
- La Moustache (1986) (translated as The Moustache, 1988)
- Hors d'atteinte (Out of Reach) (1988)
- Je suis vivant et vous êtes morts (1993) (I Am Alive and You Are Dead: A Journey into the Mind of Philip K. Dick, translated by Timothy Bent, 2005).
- La Classe de neige (1995) (Class Trip: A Novel, translated by Linda Coverdale, 1997). Winner of the Prix Fémina Adapted in 1998 as the film of the same name directed by Claude Miller.
- L'Adversaire (2000) (The Adversary: A True Story of Monstrous Deception, translated by Linda Coverdale, 2002).
- Un roman russe (2007) (A Russian Novel (UK)/My Life as a Russian Novel (US), translated by Linda Coverdale, 2010)
- D'autres vies que la mienne (2009) (Other Lives But Mine (UK) and Lives Other Than My Own (US), translated by Linda Coverdale, 2012)
- Limonov (2011), a biography of Eduard Limonov (Limonov: The Outrageous Adventures, translated by John Lambert, 2015)
- Le Royaume (2014) (The Kingdom: A Novel, translated by John Lambert, 2017)
- Il est avantageux d'avoir où aller (2016) (97,196 Words: Essays, partial translation into English by John Lambert, 2019)
- Yoga (2020), (translated by John Lambert, 2022)
- V13 (2022)
- Kolkhoze (2025)

== Selected filmography ==
- 1996: La Classe de Neige by Claude Miller, screenwriter, adapted from Carrère's book of the same name.
- 2002: L'Adversaire by Nicole Garcia, from Carrère's book.
- 2003: Back to Kotelnich, director and screenwriter.
- 2005: The Moustache, director and screenwriter, based on his novel, starring Vincent Lindon and Emmanuelle Devos.
- 2009: I'm Glad My Mother Is Alive, co-screenwriter, based on an article by Carrère.
- 2011: All Our Desires, co-screenwriter, adapted from his book Other Lives But Mine.
- 2021: Between Two Worlds, director and co-screenwriter, loosely adapted from Florence Aubenas's book The Cleaning Lady.
- 2025: The Wizard of the Kremlin by Olivier Assayas, co-screenwriter.
