= Grand Jury Prize (Venice Film Festival) =

Second highest prize of the Venice Film Festival

Special Jury Prize
- 2026 recipient: Lee Chang-dong
- Location: Venice
- Country: Italy
- Presented by: Venice Film Festival
- First award: 1951
- Currently held by: Lee Chang-dong for Possible Love (2026)
- Website: labiennale.org/en/cinema

The Grand Jury Prize is an award given at the Venice Film Festival to one of the feature films in competition slate since 1951. It is considered the second place award next to the main award, the Golden Lion.

South Korean filmmaker Lee Chang-dong was the most recent winner for Possible Love (2026), at the 83rd Venice International Film Festival.

== History ==
Since 2016, the official name of the award has been simply the Grand Jury Prize. It has had several other names since its creation in 1951: Special Jury Prize, awarded from 1951 to 1982, and from 2006 to 2012, and Grand Special Jury Prize, awarded from 1983 to 2005, and from 2013 to 2015.

Elia Kazan was the first winner for A Streetcar Named Desire in 1951. While Soviet-Georgian filmmaker Otar Iosseliani won three times, Favorites of the Moon (1984), And Then There Was Light (1989) and Brigands (1996).

== Winners ==
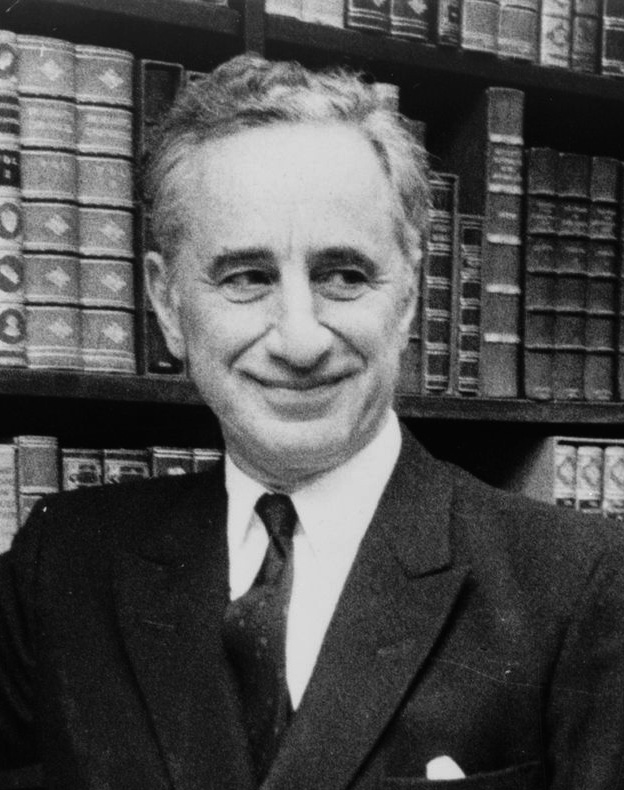
Elia Kazan won for A Streetcar Named Desire (1951)

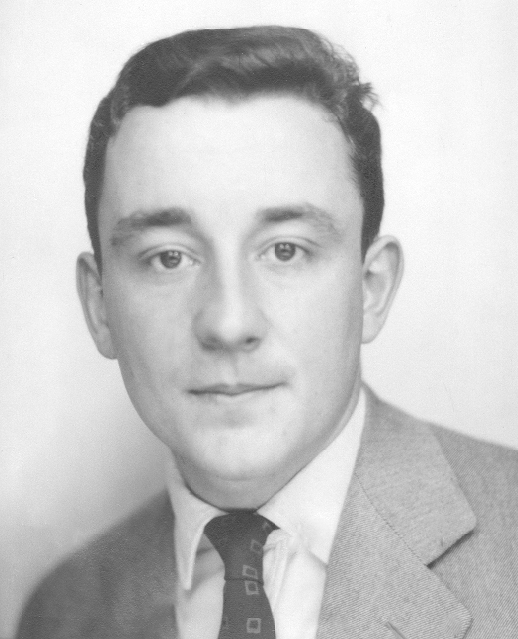
Louis Malle won twice for The Lovers (1958) and The Fire Within (1963)

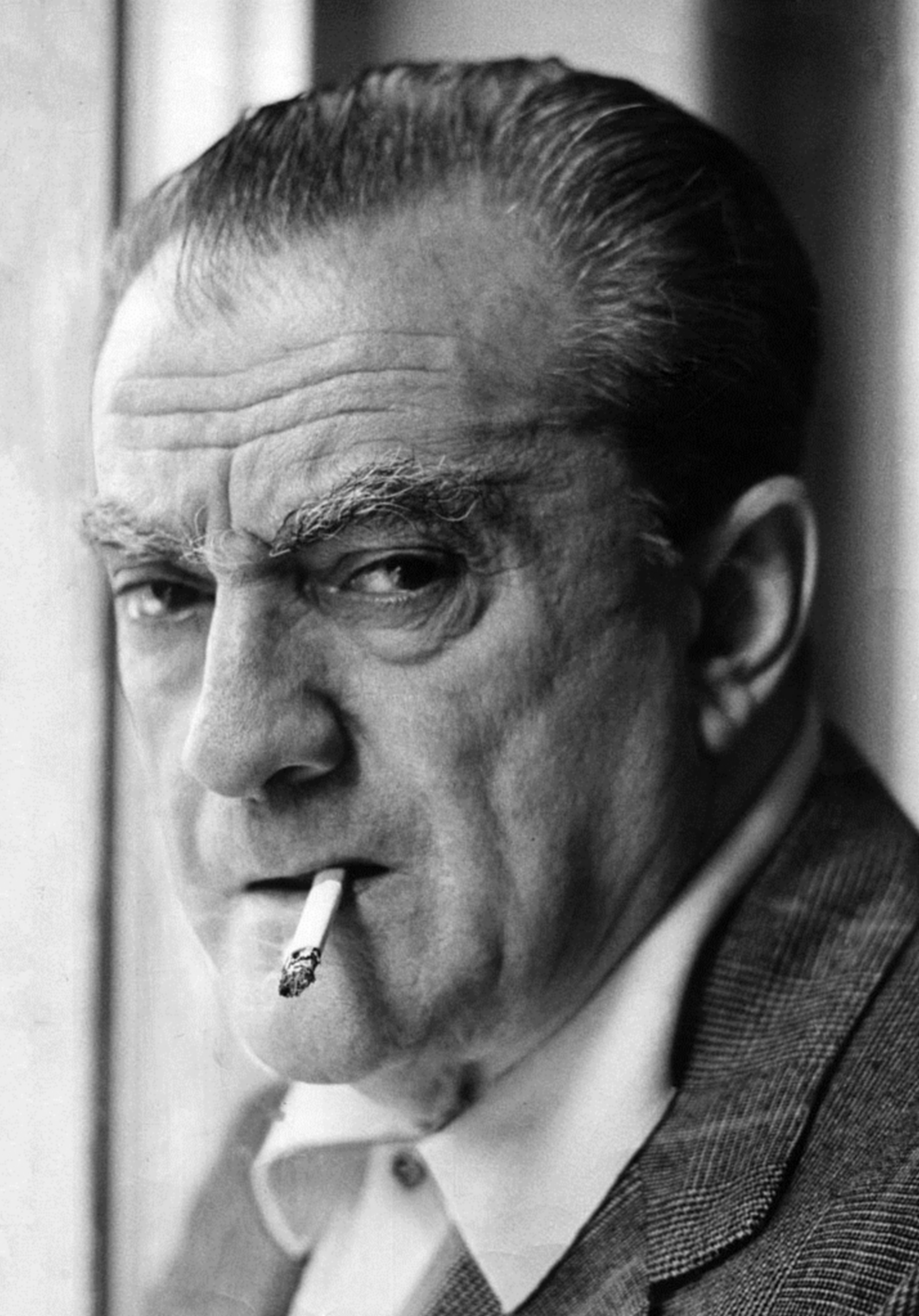
Luchino Visconti won for Rocco and His Brothers (1960)

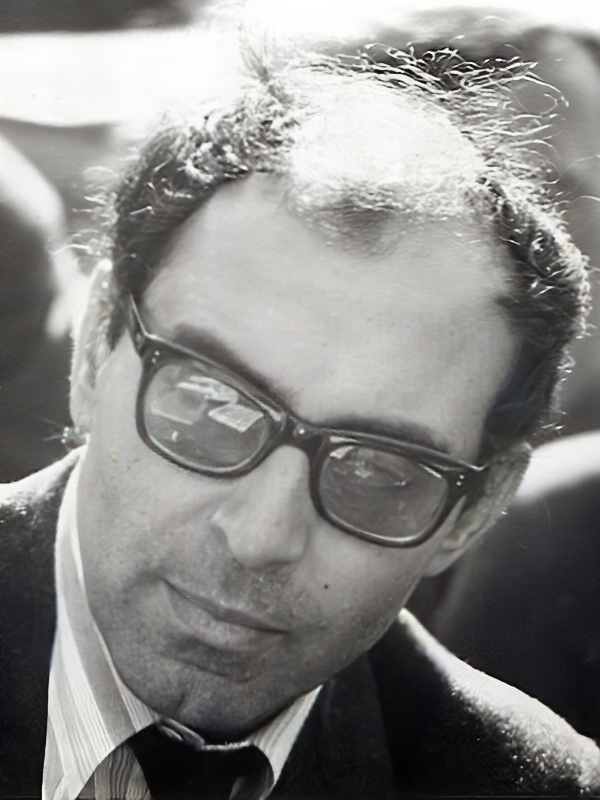
Jean-Luc Godard won for La Chinoise (1967)

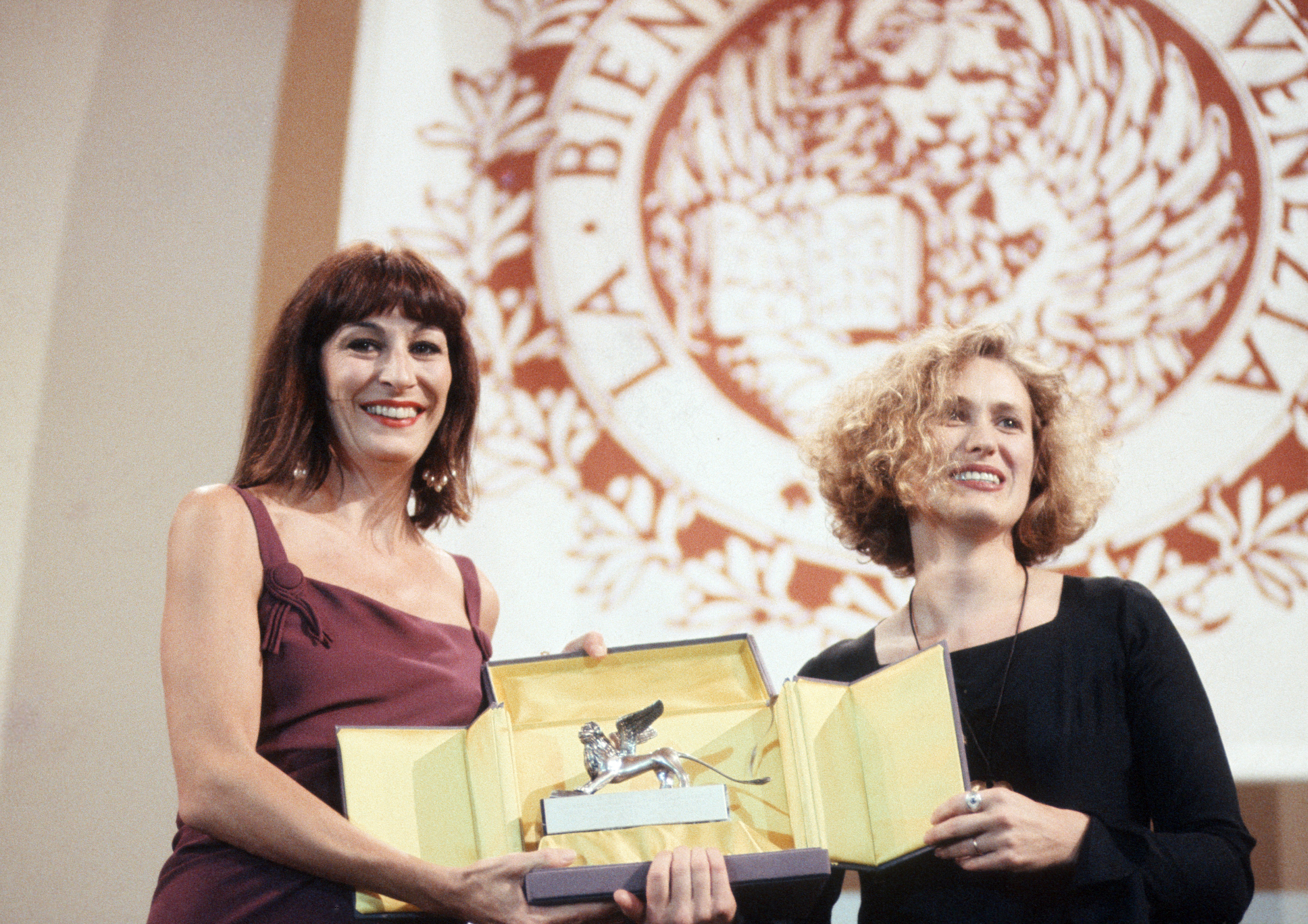
Jane Campion receiving the award from Anjelica Huston for An Angel at My Table (1990)

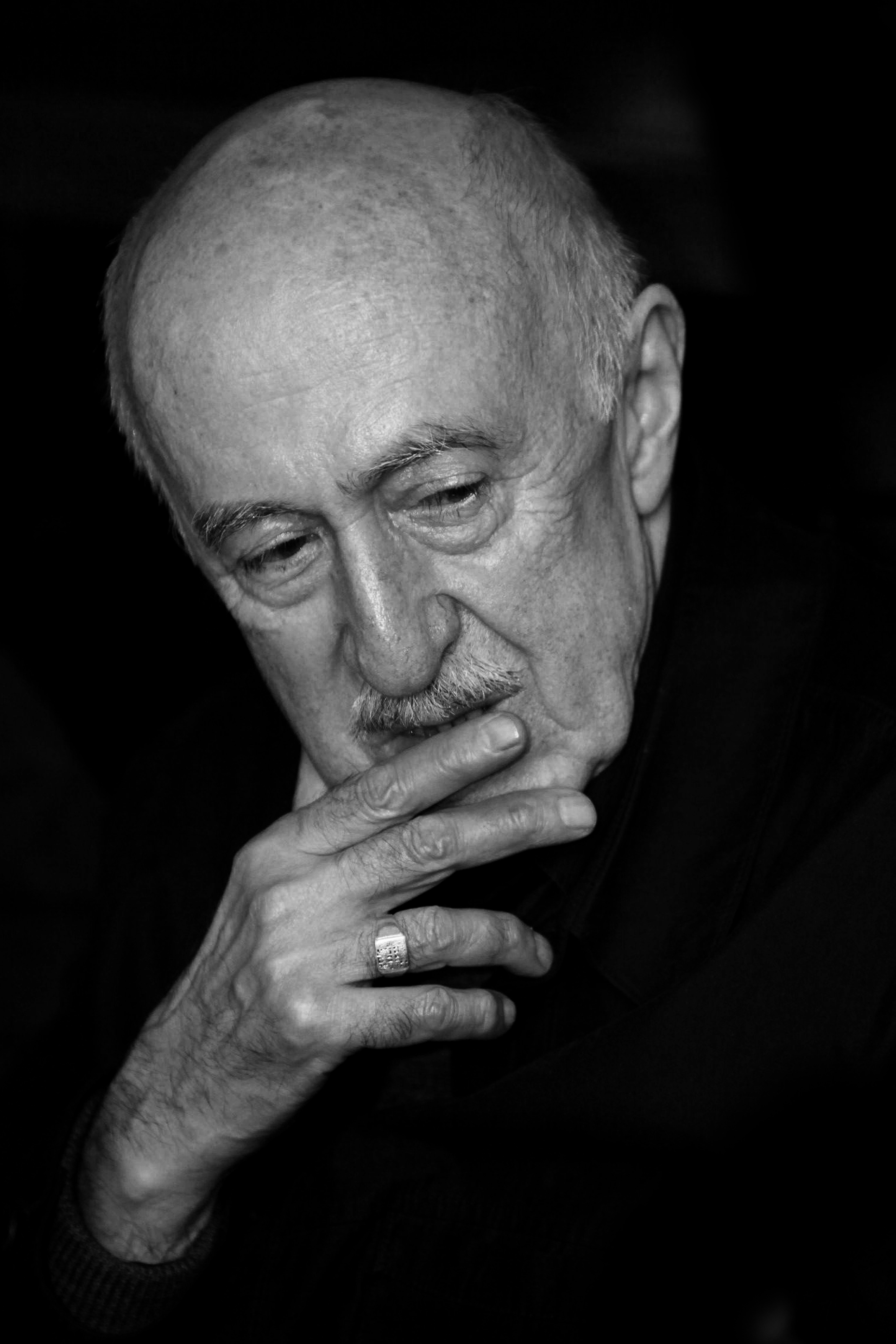
Otar Iosseliani won three times for Favorites of the Moon (1984), And Then There Was Light (1989) and Brigands (1996)

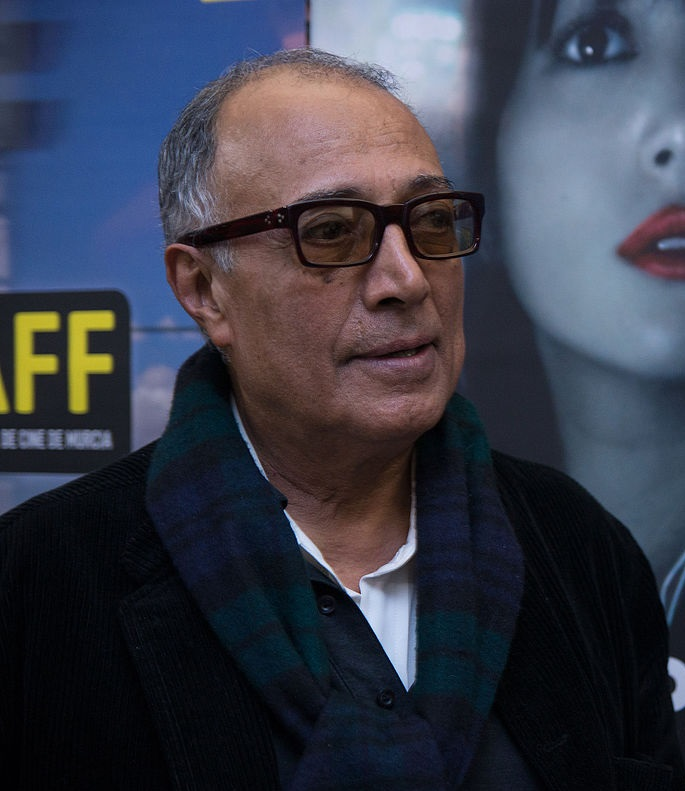
Abbas Kiarostami won for The Wind Will Carry Us (1999)

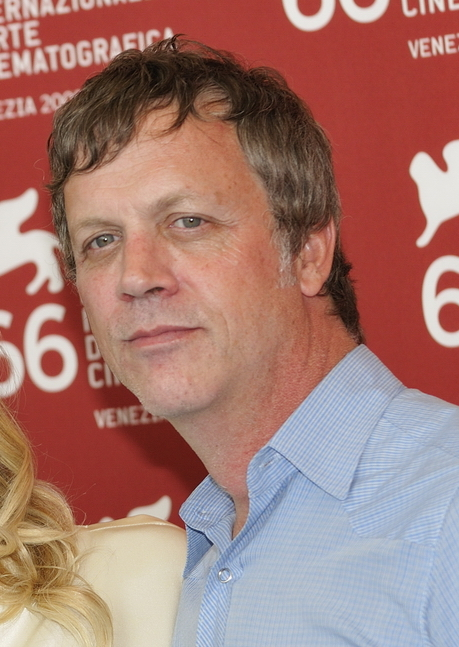
Todd Haynes won for I'm Not There (2007)

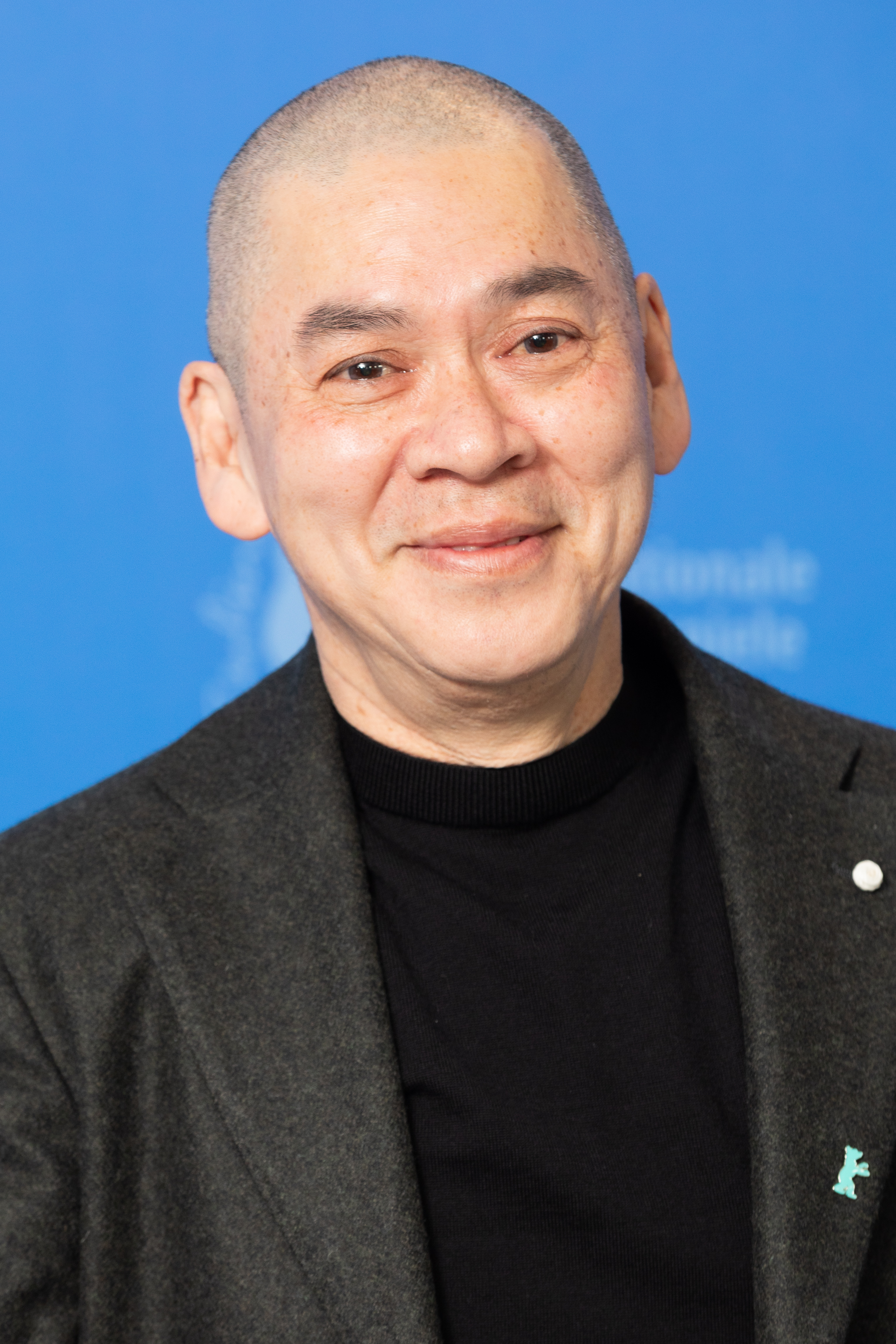
Tsai Ming-liang won for Stray Dogs (2013)

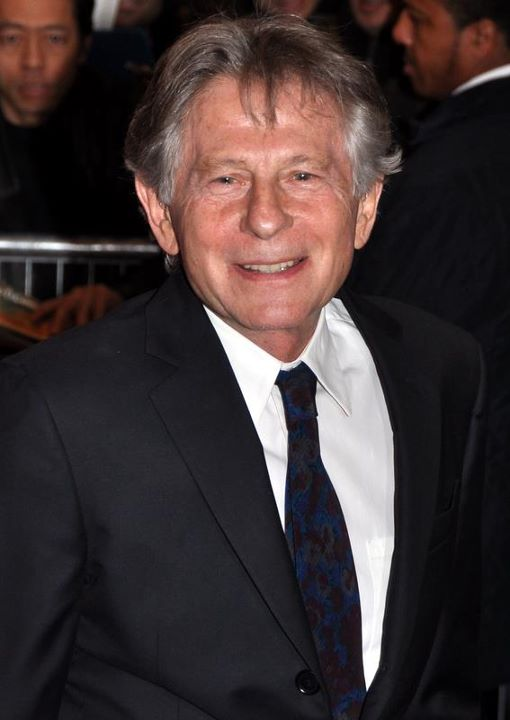
Roman Polanski won for An Officer and a Spy (2019)

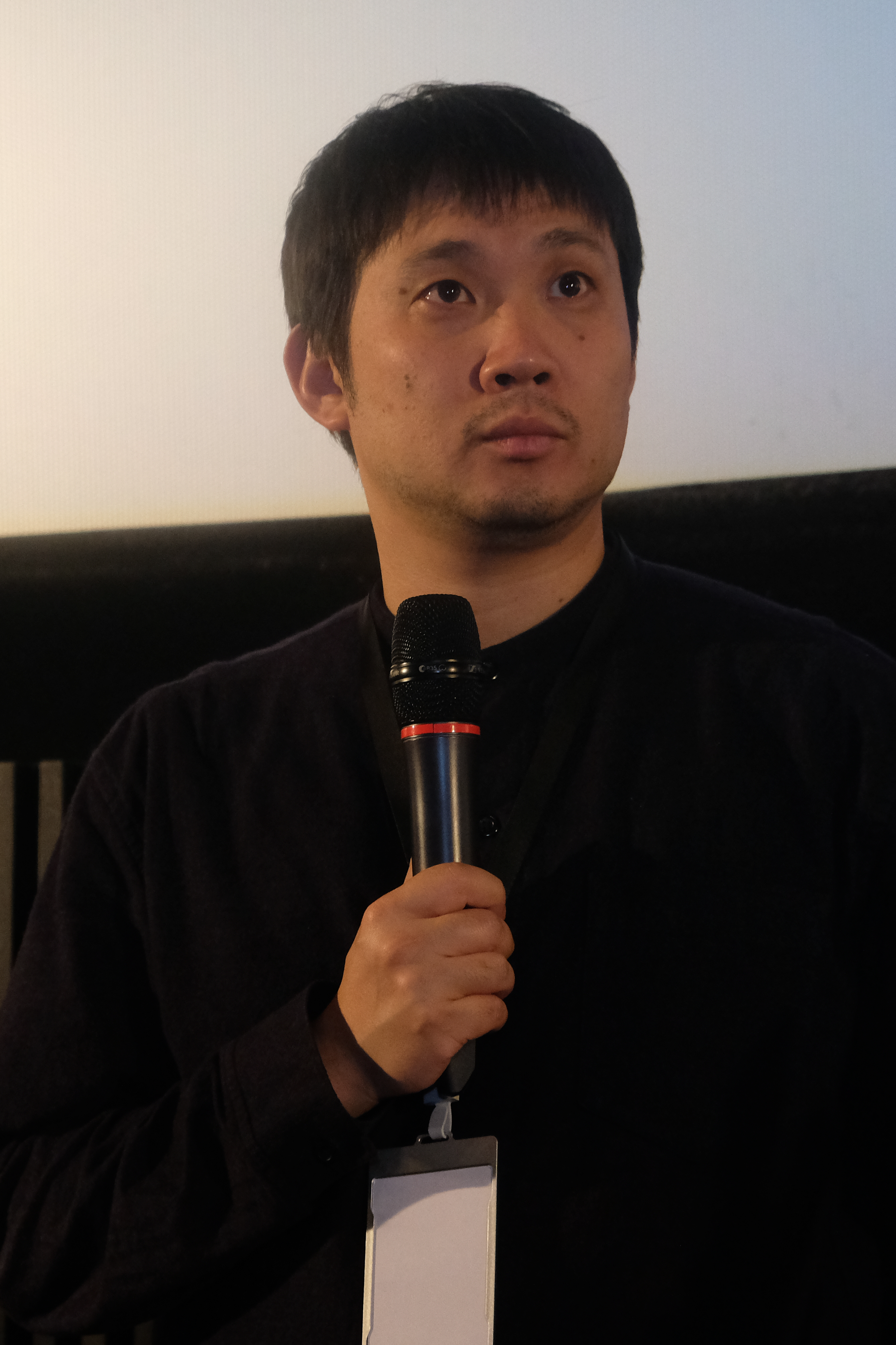
Ryusuke Hamaguchi won for Evil Does Not Exist (2023)

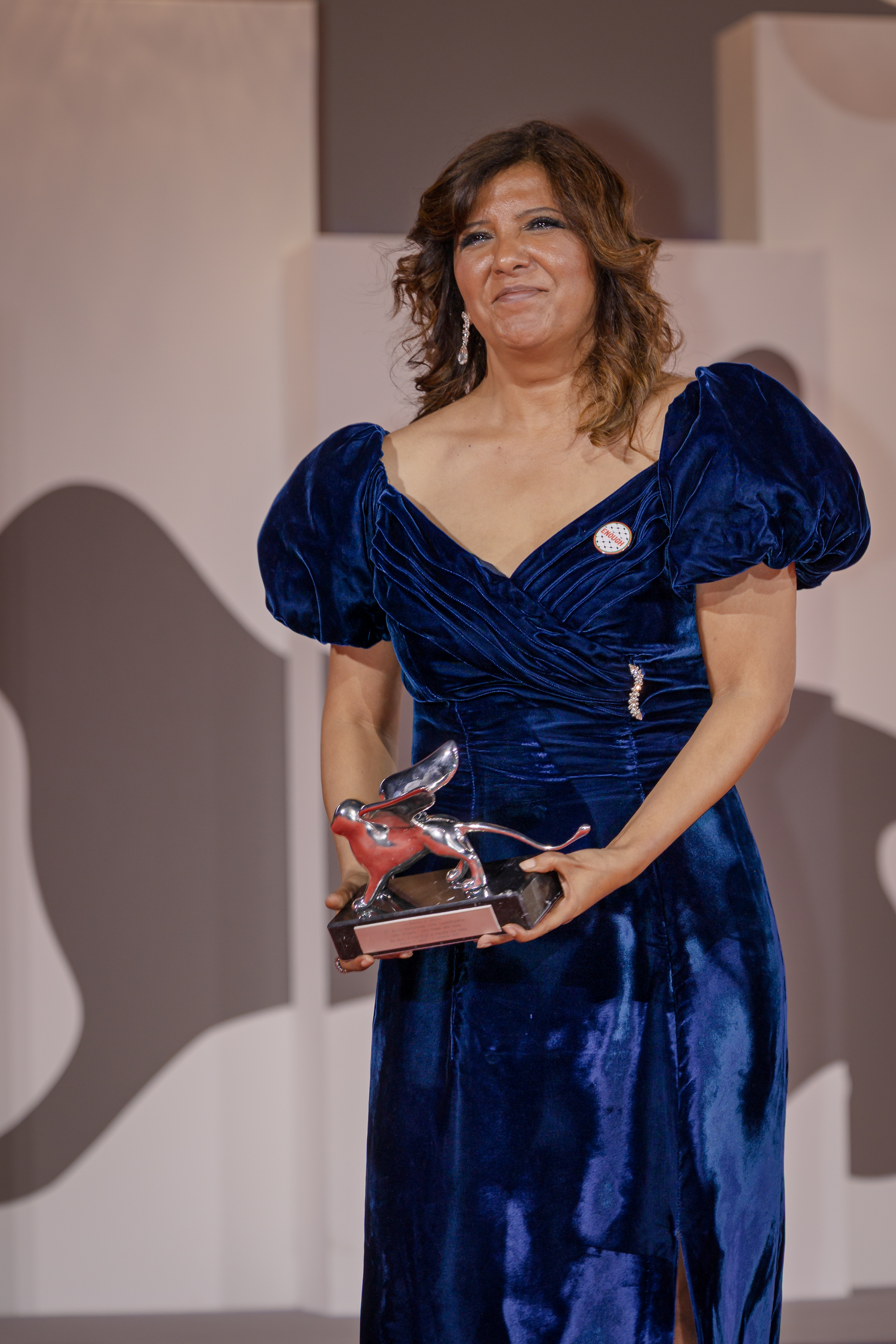
Kaouther Ben Hania won for The Voice of Hind Rajab (2025)

=== 1950s ===
Year	English title	Original title	Director	Production country
1951	A Streetcar Named Desire		Elia Kazan	United States
1952	The Curious Adventures of Mr. Wonderbird	La Bergère et le Ramoneur	Paul Grimault	France
1952	Mandy		Alexander Mackendrick	United Kingdom
1954	Executive Suite ^{*}		Robert Wise	United States
1958	The Lovers	Les amants	Louis Malle	France
1958	La sfida		Francesco Rosi	Italy, Spain
1959	The Magician	Ansiktet	Ingmar Bergman	Sweden

=== 1960s ===
Year	English title	Original title	Director	Production country
1960	Rocco and His Brothers	Rocco e i suoi fratelli	Luchino Visconti	France, Italy
1961	Peace to Him Who Enters	Мир входящему	Aleksandr Alov & Vladimir Naumov	Soviet Union
1962	My Life to Live	Vivre sa vie	Jean-Luc Godard	France
1963	The Fire Within	Le feu follet	Louis Malle	France, Italy
1963	Introduction to Life	Вступление	Igor Talankin	Soviet Union
1964	The Gospel According to St. Matthew	Il vangelo secondo Matteo	Pier Paolo Pasolini	Italy, Mexico
1964	Hamlet	Гамлет	Grigori Kozintsev	Soviet Union
1965	I Am Twenty	Мне двадцать лет	Marlen Khutsiev	Soviet Union
1965	Modiga mindre män		Leif Krantz	Sweden
1965	Simon of the Desert	Simón del desierto	Luis Buñuel	Mexico
1966	Chappaqua		Conrad Rooks	United States
1966	Yesterday Girl	Abschied von gestern	Alexander Kluge	Germany
1967	China is Near	La Cina è vicina	Marco Bellocchio	Italy
1967	La Chinoise		Jean-Luc Godard	France
1968	Our Lady of the Turks	Nostra Signora dei Turchi	Carmelo Bene	Italy
1968	Le Socrate		Robert Lapoujade	France, Germany

=== 1980s ===
Year	English title	Original title	Director	Production country
1981	Sweet Dreams	Sogni d'oro	Nanni Moretti	Italy
1981	They Don't Wear Black-tie	Eles Não Usam Black-Tie	Leon Hirszman	Brazil
1982	Imperative	Imperativ	Krzysztof Zanussi	France, Germany, Poland
1983	Biquefarre		Georges Rouquier	France
1984	Favorites of the Moon	Le favoris de la lune	Otar Iosseliani	France
1985	Tangos, the Exile of Gardel	Tangos, el exilio de Gardel	Fernando E. Solanas	Argentina, France
1986	A Tale of Love	Storia d'amore	Francesco Maselli	Italy
1986	Wild Pigeon	Чужая белая и рябой	Sergei Solovyov	Soviet Union
1987	Hip Hip Hurrah!	Hip hip hurra!	Kjell Grede	Denmark, Norway, Sweden
1988	Camp de Thiaroye		Sembène Ousmane and Thierno Faty Sow	Algeria, Tunisia
1989	And Then There Was Light	Et la lumière fut	Otar Iosseliani	France

=== 1990s ===
Year	English title	Original title	Director	Production country
1990	An Angel at My Table		Jane Campion	New Zealand
1991	The Divine Comedy	A Divina Comédia	Manoel de Oliveira	France, Portugal
1992	Death of a Neapolitan Mathematician	Morte di un matematico napoletano	Mario Martone	Italy
1993	Bad Boy Bubby		Rolf De Heer	Australia, Italy
1994	Natural Born Killers		Oliver Stone	United States
1995	God's Comedy	A Comédia de Deus	João César Monteiro	Denmark, France, Italy, Portugal
1995	The Star Maker	L'uomo delle Stelle	Giuseppe Tornatore	Italy
1996	Brigands	Brigands, chapitre VII	Otar Iosseliani	France, Italy, Russia, Switzerland
1997	Ovosodo		Paolo Virzì	Italy
1998	Next Stop Paradise	Terminus Paradis	Lucian Pintilie	France, Romania
1999	The Wind Will Carry Us	باد ما را خواهد برد	Abbas Kiarostami	Iran, France

=== 2000s ===
Year	English title	Original title	Director	Production country
2000	Before Night Falls		Julian Schnabel	United States
2001	Dog Days	Hundstage	Ulrich Seidl	Austria
2002	House of Fools	Дом дураков	Andrei Konchalovsky	Russia
2003	The Kite	طيّارة من ورق	Randa Chahal	France, Lebanon
2004	The Sea Inside	Mar adentro	Alejandro Amenábar	Spain
2005	Mary		Abel Ferrara	France, Italy, United States
2006	Dry Season	دارات	Mahamat-Saleh Haroun	Austria, Belgium, France
2007	I'm Not There		Todd Haynes	United States
2007	The Secret of the Grain	La graine et le mulet	Abdellatif Kechiche	France
2008	Teza	ጤዛ	Haile Gerima	Ethiopia, France, Germany
2009	Soul Kitchen		Fatih Akın	Germany

=== 2010s ===
Year	English title	Original title	Director	Production country
2010	Essential Killing		Jerzy Skolimowski	Poland, Hungary, Norway, Ireland
2011	Terraferma		Emanuele Crialese	Italy
2012	Paradise: Faith	Paradies: Glaube	Ulrich Seidl	Austria, France, Germany
2013	Stray Dogs	郊遊	Tsai Ming-liang	Taiwan, France
2014	The Look of Silence	Senyap	Joshua Oppenheimer	Denmark, Indonesia
2015	Anomalisa		Charlie Kaufman	United States
2016	Nocturnal Animals		Tom Ford	United States
2017	Foxtrot	פוֹקְסטְרוֹט	Samuel Maoz	France, Germany, Israel, Switzerland
2018	The Favourite		Yorgos Lanthimos	United Kingdom, United States
2019	An Officer and a Spy	J'accuse	Roman Polanski	France, Italy

=== 2020s ===
Year	English Title	Original Title	Director(s)	Production Country
2020	New Order	Nuevo Orden	Michel Franco	Mexico, France
2021	The Hand of God	È stata la mano di Dio	Paolo Sorrentino	Italy
2022	Saint Omer		Alice Diop	France
2023	Evil Does Not Exist	悪は存在しない	Ryusuke Hamaguchi	Japan
2024	Vermiglio		Maura Delpero	Italy, France, Belgium
2025	The Voice of Hind Rajab	صوت هند رجب	Kaouther Ben Hania	Tunisia, France
2026	Possible Love	가능한 사랑	Lee Chang-dong	South Korea, United States

Notes
^{*} Special Award given for the ensemble acting of the film.

== Multiple winners ==
The following individuals received two or more Grand Jury Prize awards:

Number of Wins	Directors	Nationality
3	Otar Iosseliani	Soviet Union, Georgia
2	Jean-Luc Godard	France
2	Louis Malle	France
2	Ulrich Seidl	Austria

== See also ==
- Golden Lion
- Special Jury Prize
