= 53rd Venice International Film Festival =

Italian film festival in 1996

- Opening film: Sleepers
- Location: Venice, Italy
- Founded: 1932
- Awards: Golden Lion: Michael Collins
- Artistic director: Gillo Pontecorvo
- Festival date: 28 August – 7 September 1996
- Website: Website

Venice Film Festival chronology
- 54th 52nd

The 53rd annual Venice International Film Festival was held between 28 August to 7 September 1996.

Polish filmmaker Roman Polanski was the Jury President of the main competition. The Golden Lion winner was Michael Collins directed by Neil Jordan.

== Jury ==
=== Main Competition ===
The following people comprised the 1996 jury:

- Roman Polanski, Polish filmmaker - Jury President
- Paul Auster, American writer and director
- Souleymane Cissé, Malian filmmaker
- Callisto Cosulich, Italian film critic, author, journalist and screenwriter
- Anjelica Huston, American actress
- Miriam Mafai, Italian journalist, author and politician
- Mrinal Sen, Indian filmmaker
- Antonio Skármeta, Chilean writer
- Hülya Uçansu, Turkish cultural manager, director of the Istanbul Film Festival

== Official Sections ==
=== In Competition ===
English title	Original title	Director(s)	Production country
Basquiat		Julian Schnabel	United States
Brigands	Brigands, chapitre VII	Otar Iosseliani	France, Russia, Italy, Switzerland, Georgia
Buddha Bless America	太平天國	Wu Nien-jen	Taiwan
Carla's Song		Ken Loach	United Kingdom, Spain, Germany
Chronicle of a Disappearance	سجل اختفاء	Elia Suleiman	Israel, Palestine
Deep Crimson	Profundo carmesí	Arturo Ripstein	Mexico
For Ever Mozart		Jean-Luc Godard	France, Switzerland
The Funeral		Abel Ferrara	United States
Ilona Arrives with the Rain	Ilona llega con la lluvia	Sergio Cabrera	Colombia, Italy, Spain
Men, Women: A User's Manual	Hommes, femmes, mode d'emploi	Claude Lelouch	France
Michael Collins		Neil Jordan	Ireland, United Kingdom, United States
The Ogre	Der Unhold	Volker Schlöndorff	France, Germany, United Kingdom
Party		Manoel de Oliveira	France, Portugal
Ponette		Jacques Doillon	France
Sacred Silence	Pianese Nunzio, 14 anni a maggio	Antonio Capuano	Italy
Vesna Goes Fast	Vesna va veloce	Carlo Mazzacurati	Italy, France

=== Out of Competition ===
- Sleepers by Barry Levinson (United States) - Opening film
- Third Millenium Stories by Francesco Maselli (Italy)
- Shine by Scott Hicks (Australia)
- The Portrait of a Lady by Jane Campion (United Kingdom)

=== Venetian Nights ===
- Bound by The Wachowskis (United States)
- The Fan by Tony Scott (United States)
- Independence Day by Roland Emmerich (United States)
- Bambola by Bigas Luna (Spain-Italy-France)
- Last Man Standing by Walter Hill (United States)
- Multiplicity by Harold Ramis (United States)
- Szamanka by Andrzej Zulawski (Poland)
- The Frighteners by Peter Jackson (Australia)
- True Blue by Ferdinand Fairfax (United Kingdom)

=== Window on Images ===
- Zone Franche by Paul Vecchiali (France)
- The Age of Possibilities by Pascale Ferran (France)
- Chronicle of a Disappearance by Elia Suleiman (Israel, United States, Germany, France)
- Méfie-toi de l'eau qui dort by Jacques Deschamps (France)
- Hard Core Logo by Bruce McDonald (Canada)
- Metamorphosis of a Melody by Amos Gitai (Israel)
- De nieuwe moeder by Paula van der Oest (Netherlands)
- Escoriandoli by Flavia Mastrella, Antonio Rezza (Italy)
- Guy by Michael Lindsay-Hogg (United States)
- Polygraph by Robert Lepage (Canada)
- Love and Other Catastrophes by Emma-Kate Croghan (Australia)
- A True Story by Abolfazl Jalili (Iran)

==== Documentaries ====
- The Games of Love by Frederick Wiseman (France)
- Sei minuti all'alba by Daniele Segre (Italy)
- And the Show Goes On by Mrinal Sen (United Kingdom, France, India)
- Yang Yin Genger in Chinese Cinema by Stanley Kwan (Hong Kong)
- Bophana: A Cambodian Tragedy by Rithy Panh (France, Cambodia)
- Die Frucht deines Leibes by Barbara Albert (Austria)
- A Trick of Light by Wim Wenders (Germany)
- Le convoi by Patrice Chagnard (France)
- La vita a volo D'Angelo by Roberta Torre (Italy)
- Marco Melani, ladro e frate di cinema by Enrico Ghezzi, Carmelo Marabello (Italy)

=== Overtaking Lane ===
- Swingers by Doug Liman (United States)
- Kolya by Jan Svěrák (Czech Republic)
- The Dress by Alex van Warmerdam (Netherlands)
- Intimate Relations by Philip Goodhew (Canada)
- Fistful of Flies by Monica Pellizzari (Australia)
- Lea by Ivan Fíla (Czech Republic)
- Livers Ain't Cheap by James Merendino (United States)
- Swallowtail Butterfly by Shunji Iwai (Japan)
- Ni d'Ève, ni d'Adam by Jean-Paul Civeyrac (France)

=== Italian Cinema Week ===
- Isotta by Maurizio Fiume (Italy)
- Albergo Roma by Ugo Chiti (Italy)
- We Free Kings by Sergio Citti (Italy)
- Acquario by Michele Sordillo (Italy)
- The Border by Franco Giraldi (Italy)
- My Generation by Wilma Labate (Italy)
- Voci nel tempo by Franco Piavoli (Italy)

=== Special Screenings ===
- Fantoosh by Morag McKinnon (United Kingdom)
- Nitrato d'argento by Marco Ferreri (Italy)
- Go Now by Michael Winterbottom (United Kingdom)
- Festival by Pupi Avati (Italy)
- Grace of My Heart by Allison Anders (United States)
- Pole Pole by Massimo Martelli (Italy)
- How the Toys Saved Christmas by Enzo D'Alò (Italy, Switzerland, Germany, Luxembourg)
- Forgotten Silver by Peter Jackson (Australia)
- The Gates of Heaven by Vittorio De Sica (Italy)
- Small Wonders by Allan Miller (United States)
- Loach in Nicaragua by Marlisa Trombetta (Italy)
- Long Fliv the King by Leo McCarey (United States)
- Flaming Fathers by Leo McCarey (United States)

== Official Awards ==
=== Main Competition ===
- Golden Lion: Michael Collins by Neil Jordan
- Grand Special Jury Prize: Brigands by Otar Iosseliani
- Golden Osella:
  - Best Original Screenplay: Profundo carmesí by Paz Alicia Garciadiego
  - Best Original Music: David Mansfield for Profundo carmesí
  - Best Production Design: Profundo carmesí by Mónica Chirinos e Marisa Pecanins
- Volpi Cup for Best Actor: Liam Neeson for Michael Collins
  - Volpi Cup for Best Supporting Actor: Chris Penn for The Funeral
- Volpi Cup for Best Actress: Victoire Thivisol for Ponette
- Honorable Mention: Jan Svěrák for Kolya

=== Luigi De Laurentis Award for a Debut Film ===
- Chronicle of a Disappearance by Elia Suleiman

=== Career Golden Lion ===
- Robert Altman
- Michèle Morgan
- Vittorio Gassman
- Dustin Hoffman

== Independent Awards ==
=== The President of the Italian Senate's Gold Medal ===
- Ken Loach for Carla's Song

=== FIPRESCI Prize ===
- Alex van Warmerdam for De jurk
- Pascale Ferran for L'âge des possibles
- Jacques Doillon for Ponette

=== OCIC Award ===
- Jacques Doillon for Ponette
- Abel Ferrara for The Funeral

=== OCIC Special Award ===
- La porta del cielo
  - Honorable Mention: Ivan Fila for Lea

=== UNICEF Award ===
- Volker Schlöndorff for Der Unhold

=== CICT-IFTC Award ===
- Small Wonders by Allan Miller

=== Pasinetti Award ===
- Best Film: The Portrait of a Lady by Jane Campion
- Best Actor: Fabrizio Bentivoglio for Pianese Nunzio, 14 anni a maggio
- Best Actress: Tereza Zajickova for Vesna va veloce

=== Pietro Bianchi Award ===
- Roberto Perpignani
- Carlo Lizzani

=== FEDIC Award ===
- Voci nel tempo by Franco Piavoli

=== Little Golden Lion ===
- Claude Lelouch for Hommes, femmes, mode d'emploi

=== Elvira Notari Prize ===
- Monica Pellizzari for Fistful of Flies

=== Sergio Trasatti Award ===
- Jacques Doillon for Ponette

=== 'CinemAvvenire' Award ===
- Best Film on the Relationship Man-Nature: Jacques Deschamps for Still Waters Run Deep
- Best First Work: Jacques Deschamps for Still Waters Run Deep

=== Kodak Award ===
- Ugo Chiti for Albergo Roma

=== AIACA Award ===
- Stefano Gigli for Il fratello minore
