= Bernard Eisenschitz =

French film critic, subtitler and historian

Bernard Eisenschitz (born 3 July 1944 in Saint-Calais, France) is a French film critic, subtitler and historian. He has also directed, produced and restored films.

== Achievements ==
Eisenschitz modelled himself on the film historian Georges Sadoul, the definitive edition of whose masterwork, the Histoire générale du cinéma, he edited. Eisenschitz is an internationally known expert on Fritz Lang and Nicholas Ray, as well as Chris Marker and Robert Kramer. He has worked and published on Friedrich Wilhelm Murnau, Ernst Lubitsch, German cinema and the history of the Cinémathèque française, among other topics.

Eisenschitz wrote for Cahiers du cinéma between about 1967 and 1972, and for La nouvelle critique from 1970 to 1977. In 2001, he founded the periodical Cinéma. In the same year, he completed the definitive restoration of Jean Vigo's film L'Atalante and made a documentary on the film's different restorations entitled Les Voyages de L'Atalante.

He has on occasion appeared as an actor in films for director-friends of his, for example in Jacques Rivette's Out 1, The Mother and the Whore by Jean Eustache, Le Prestige de la mort by Luc Moullet, and in films by Otar Iosseliani, Wim Wenders et Amos Gitaï. He is a regular speaker at film screenings and festivals including the archival festival Il Cinema Ritrovato in Bologna.

The film critic Jacques Mandelbaum has said of Eisenschitz that "Traducteur, historien du cinéma, programmateur, réalisateur et acteur à l'occasion, Eisenschitz est l'une de ces figures secrètes de la cinéphilie dont l'érudition et la finesse de touche se rendent toujours disponibles à qui les sollicite" [Translator, film historian, programmer, director and occasional actor, Eisenschitz is one of those secret cinephiliac figures whose erudition and subtlety are always at the disposal of those who ask].

In 2012 Eisenschitz received the Reinhold Schünzel Award at the cinefest – Internationales Festival des deutschen Film-Erbes in Hamburg.

== Filmography ==
- 1968 : Pick up (short)
- 1974 : Printemps 58 (short)
- 2001 : Les Messages de Fritz Lang (short)
- 2003 : Chaplin Today : Monsieur Verdoux (TV documentary)
- 2017: Tournage d’hiver: L’Atalante de Jean Vigo chutes et rushes

== As actor ==
(Source)

- 1971: Out 1 (Jacques Rivette)
- 1973: La maman et la putain (Jean Eustache)
- 1984: Les Favoris de la lune (Otar Iosseliani)
- 1993: Les Enfants jouent à la Russie (Jean-Luc Godard)
- 2006: Le prestige de la mort (Luc Moullet)
- 2008 : L'Idiot (Pierre Léon)
- 2010: Chantrapas (Otar Iosseliani)
- 2013 : Biette (Pierre Léon)
- 2016 : Deux Rémi, Deux (Pierre Léon)

== Publications ==
- Humphrey Bogart, Paris, Eric Losfeld, Le Terrain vague, 1967
- Ernst Lubitsch, Anthologie du cinéma, 1969
- Douglas Fairbanks, Anthologie du cinéma, 1969
- Le Cinéma allemand aujourd’hui, Paris, Documents, 1976; Paris, Nathan, coll. Cinéma 128, 1999
- Les restaurations de la Cinémathèque française, 1986
- Roman américain, les vies de Nicholas Ray, Christian Bourgois, 1990
- Man Hunt de Fritz Lang, Crisnée, Yellow Now, 1992
- Frank Tashlin (1994) (co-edited with Roger Garcia)
- Chris Marker, Festival de Pesaro, Dino Audino Editore, Rome, 1996
- Le Cinema allemand, 1999
- Gels et Dégels, Une autre histoire du cinéma soviétique, 1926-1968, 2000
- Points de départ : entretien avec Robert Kramer, 2001
- Fritz Lang au travail. Éditions Cahiers du cinéma. 2011. ISBN 978-2-86642-808-2.

== Notes ==
↑ « Fritz Lang était un des héros de ma famille, originaire, comme lui, d'Autriche et d'Allemagne. » Eisenschitz sur leMonde.fr↑ Willy et Bernard Eisenschitz↑ Bernard Eisenschitz sur Le Monde
