= Nicolas Zourabichvili =

French composer of Georgian origin (born 1936)

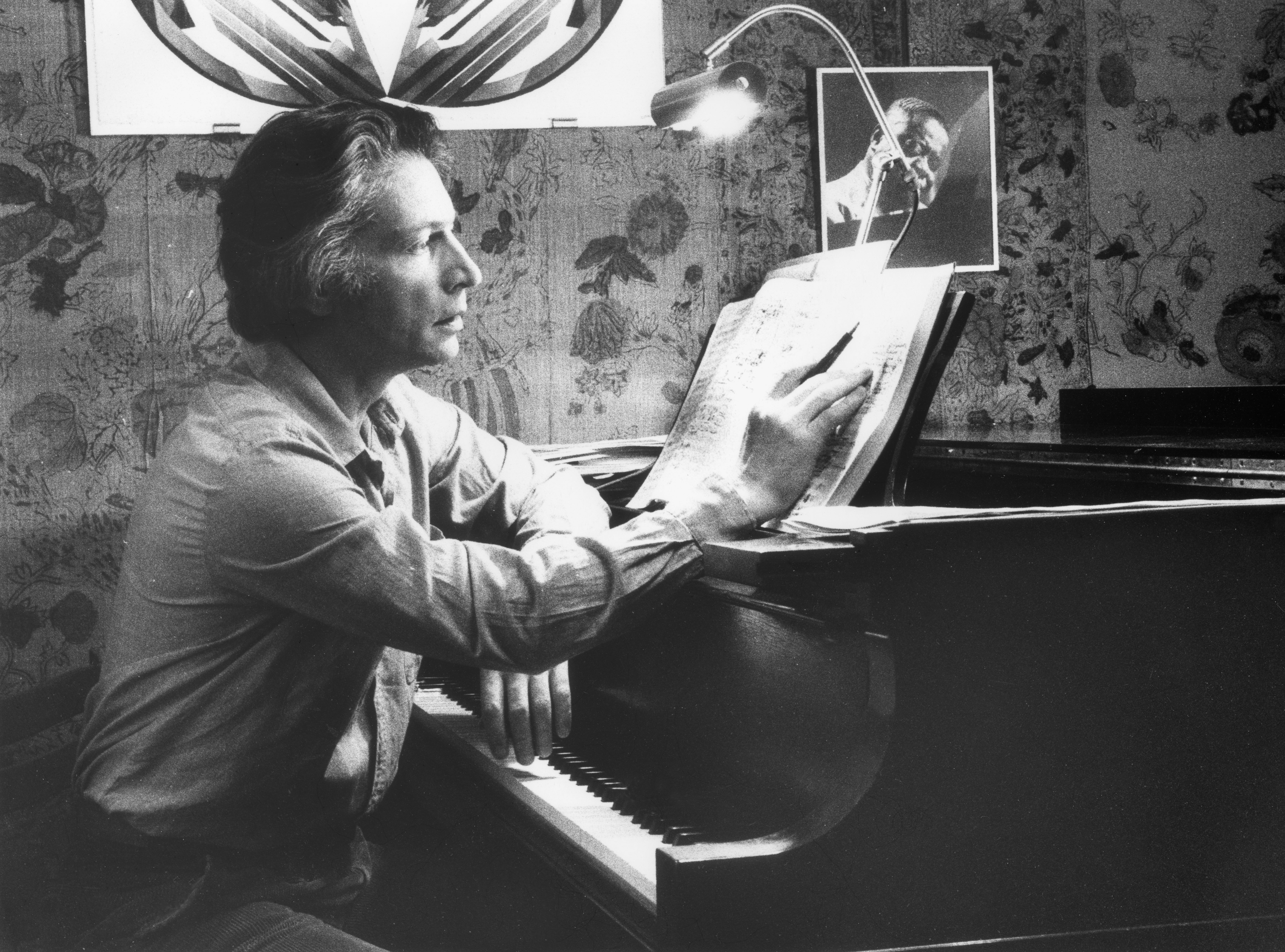
Nicolas Zourabichvili

Nicolas Zourabichvili (born 24 October 1936) is a French composer.

== Biography ==
Born in Paris, Zourabichvili began piano studies at the Bordeaux conservatory. He studied composition with Nadia Boulanger (1959–1962) and with Max Deutsch (1962–1964). He was awarded the Lili Boulanger Prize in 1970. In 1965 his philosopher-to-be son François was born.

He wrote scores for director Otar Iosseliani's films: Favorites of the Moon (1984), And Then There Was Light (1989), The Butterfly Hunt (1992), Brigands-Chapter VII (1996), Farewell, Home Sweet Home (1999), Monday Morning (2002), Gardens in Autumn (2006), Winter Song (2015).

== Selected works ==
- Mtskheta (1976)
- Declaracion del desangelado (1971)
- Aus ödem Traumland, for string orchestra (first performed 1975 by the Nouvel Orchestre Philharmonique de Radio-France conducted by André Girard)
- Mass (1976)
- La Fuite (1987) for violin solo
- Syntonie ligulienne (1996) for flute solo
- For piano solo: Sonata, Six variations, Thrène pour Thelonious Monk (1983), Vita nova (1994)
- Three string quartets
- Gebet für die Irren und Sträflinge (1966) recorded by the Ensemble Musique Vivante de Paris (conducted by Gabriele Guevara, soprano Anna-Maria Miranda)
- Sekhmet for two pianos, premiered on 8 April 2013 at the Festival Maskfest in San Marino
