= 41st Venice International Film Festival =

1984 film festival in Italy

- Location: Venice, Italy
- Founded: 1932
- Awards: Golden Lion: A Year of the Quiet Sun
- Artistic director: Gian Luigi Rondi
- Festival date: 1 – 11 September 1984
- Website: Website

Venice Film Festival chronology
- 42nd 40th

The 41st annual Venice International Film Festival was held from 1 to 11 September 1984 under the direction of Gian Luigi Rondi.

Italian filmmaker Michelangelo Antonioni was the Jury President of the main competition. The Golden Lion winner was A Year of the Quiet Sun directed by Krzysztof Zanussi.

The main event of this edition was, out of competition, the premiere of Heimat, an almost 16 hours-long film directed by Edgar Reitz. Among the other titles showed out of competition there were Steven Spielberg's Indiana Jones and the Temple of Doom, Wolfgang Petersen's The NeverEnding Story and a restored version of Metropolis edited and scored by Giorgio Moroder. The retrospective was dedicated to Luis Buñuel.

== Jury ==
The following people comprised the 1984 jury:

- Michelangelo Antonioni, Italian filmmaker - Jury President
- Rafael Alberti, Spanish poet
- Balthus, French painter
- Günter Grass, West German author and visual artist
- Joris Ivens, Dutch filmmaker
- Erica Jong, American writer and poet
- Erland Josephson, Swedish actor
- Goffredo Petrassi, Italian composer
- Isaac Bashevis Singer, American author
- Paolo Taviani, Italian filmmaker
- Vittorio Taviani, Italian filmmaker
- Yevgeny Yevtushenko, Soviet poet

== Official Sections ==
The following films were selected to be screened:

=== In Competition ===
English title	Original title	Director(s)	Production country
Angela's War	Angelas Krig	Eija-Elina Bergholm	Finland
The Annunciation	Angyali udvozlet	Andràs Jeles	Hungary
Claretta Petacci	Claretta	Pasquale Squitieri	Italy
Dionysos		Jean Rouch	France
Favorites of the Moon	Le favoris de la lune	Otar Ioseliani	France
Full Moon in Paris	Les nuits de la pleine lune	Eric Rohmer	France
The Future Is Woman	Il futuro è donna	Marco Ferreri	Italy
Greystoke: The Legend of Tarzan, Lord of the Apes		Hugh Hudson	United Kingdom
Love on the Ground	L'amour par terre	Jacques Rivette	France
Love Unto Death	L'amour à mort	Alain Resnais	France
Maria's Lovers		Andrei Konchalovsky	United States
The Mirror	Der Spiegel	Erden Kiral	West Germany
La neve nel bicchiere		Florestano Vancini	Italy
No One Twice	Ninguem duas vezes	Jorge Silva Melo	Portugal
Paar		Goutam Ghose	India
A Proper Scandal	Uno scandalo perbene	Pasquale Festa Campanile	Italy
Sister Stella L.		Mike De Leon	Philippines
The Shore	Bereg	Aleksandr Alov, Vladimir Naumov	Soviet Union
Sonatine		Micheline Lanctôt	Canada
The Stilts	Los zancos	Carlos Saura	Spain
The Three of Us	Noi tre	Pupi Avati	Italy
Tukuma		Palle Kjærulff-Schmidt	Denmark
Under the Bridge	Da qiao xia mian	Chen Bai	China
Ybris		Gavino Ledda	Italy
A Year of the Quiet Sun	Rok spokojnego słońca	Krzysztof Zanussi	Poland

=== Out of competition ===
English title	Original title	Director(s)	Production country
Carmen		Francesco Rosi	France, Italy
Christopher Columbus		Alberto Lattuada	Italy, United States, France, West Germany
Heart	Cuore	Luigi Comencini	Italy
Heimat		Edgar Reitz	West Germany
Kaos		Taviani Brothers	Italy
Kindergarten	Детский сад	Yevgeny Yevtushenko	Soviet Union
Once Upon a Time in America		Sergio Leone	United States, Italy

=== Venezia Notte ===
English title	Original title	Director(s)	Production country
Good King Dagobert	Le bon roi Dagobert	Dino Risi	France, Italy
Indiana Jones and the Temple of Doom		Steven Spielberg	United States
Metropolis (Giorgio Moroder version)		Fritz Lang	Germany
The NeverEnding Story	Die unendliche Geschichte	Wolfgang Petersen	West Germany, United States
So Long, Stooge	Tchao Pantin	Claude Berri	France
Streets of Fire		Walter Hill	United States
Tensão no Rio		Gustavo Dahl	Brazil
Viva la vie		Claude Lelouch	France

=== Special Events ===
English title	Original title	Director(s)	Production country
Flags Of The Future	Las banderas del amanecer	Jorge Sanjinés, Beatriz Palacios	Bolivia
Island of Loves	A Ilha dos Amores	Paulo Rocha	Portugal, Japan
Our Nazi	Notre nazi	Robert Kramer	France
Rafael Alberti, un retrato del poeta		Fernando Birri	Italy, Venezuela
War Boys	Los chicos de la guerra	Bebe Kamin	Argentina
Wundkanal		Thomas Harlan	France, West Germany

=== Venezia TV ===
English title	Original title	Director(s)	Production country
El balcón abierto		Jaime Camino	Spain
Bluebeard	Blaubart	Krzysztof Zanussi	Poland
Un caso d'incoscienza		Emidio Greco	Italy
Charles et Lucie		Nelly Kaplan	France
Eva e Dio		Matteo Bellinelli	Italy
Illusion	Illusione	Jerko Victor Tognola	Switzerland
Laughterhouse		Richard Eyre	United Kingdom
Nucleo zero		Carlo Lizzani	Italy
Sogni e bisogni		Sergio Citti	Italy
Un delitto		Salvatore Nocita	Italy

=== Venezia De Sica ===
English title	Original title	Director(s)	Production country
The Boy from Ebalus	Il ragazzo di Ebalus	Giuseppe Schito	Italy
Chewingum		Biagio Proietti	Italy
Chi mi aiuta...?		Valerio Zecca	Italy
In punta di piedi		Giampiero Mele	Italy
Il mistero del morca		Marco Mattolini	Italy
Una notte di pioggia		Romeo Costantini	Italy
L'inceneritore		Pier Francesco Boscaro dagli Ambrosi	Italy
Ladies & Gentlemen	Signore e signori	Tonino Pulci	Italy
Pianoforte		Francesca Comencini	Italy
Pirata! Cult Movie		Paolo Ricagno	Italy
Spiaccichiccicaticelo		Leone Creti	Italy

== Independent Sections ==
=== Venice International Film Critics' Week ===
The following feature films were selected to be screened as In Competition for this section:

English title	Original title	Director(s)	Production country
Beyond The Walls	Meachorei Hasoragim	Uri Barbash	Israel
End of the Miracle	A csoda vége	János Vészi	Hungary
Final Call	Unerreichbare Nähe	Dagmar Hirtz	West Germany
Mosquito on the 10th Floor	十階のモスキート	Yoichi Sai	Japan
O pokojniku sve najlepse		Predrag Antonijevic	Yugoslavia
Strikebound		Richard Lowenstein	Austria
Wildrose		John Hanson	United States

== Official Awards ==
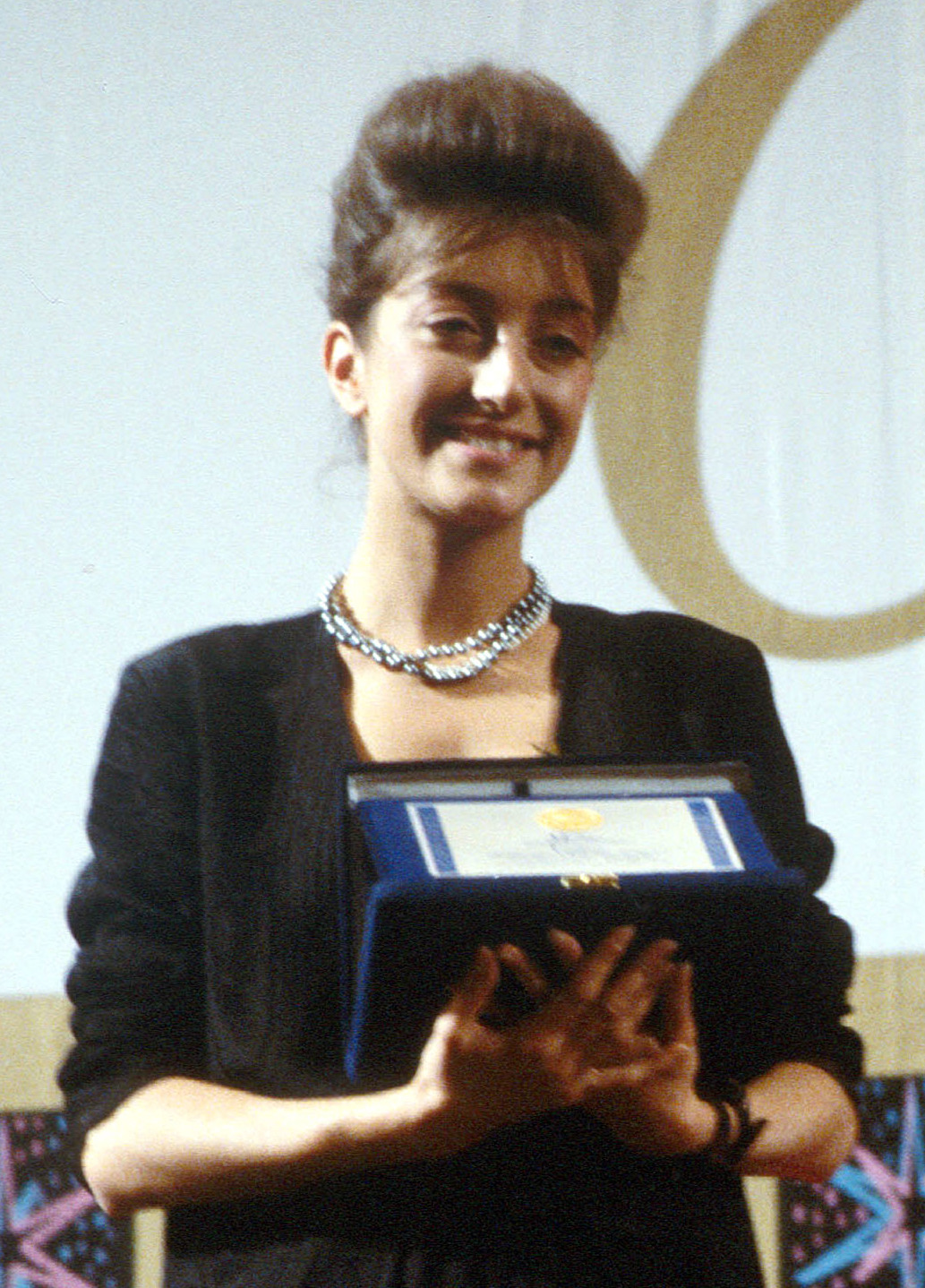
Pascale Ogier, winner of Volpi Cup Best Actress at 41st Venice International Film Festival

=== Main Competition ===
- Golden Lion: A Year of the Quiet Sun by Krzysztof Zanussi
- Silver Lion for Best First Film: Sonatine by Micheline Lanctôt
- Grand Special Jury Prize: Favorites of the Moon by Otar Ioseliani
- Volpi Cup for Best Actor: Naseeruddin Shah for Paar
- Volpi Cup for Best Actress: Pascale Ogier for Full Moon in Paris
