= Vincent Blanchet =

French filmmaker (1945–2011)

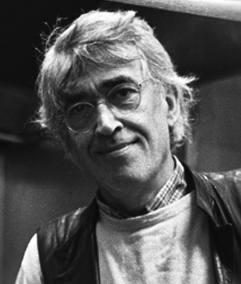
- Vincent Blanchet
- Born: 16 April 1945; Neuilly-sur-Seine, France
- Died: 13 March 2011 (aged 65)
- Occupation: Film director - Documentary film teacher - Microphone builder

Vincent Blanchet (16 April 1945 – 13 March 2011) was a French filmmaker, documentary teacher and inventor of microphones.

== Biography ==
Vincent Evart Blanchet was born in Neuilly-sur-Seine, Paris, to Dutch-born artist Bernarda Vleming Blanchet and French poet Jean Auguste Blanchet.

From 1962 to 1967, Blanchet filmed a series of 16-mm amateur shorts in a Parisian Ciné-Club while attending the screenings of Henri Langlois at the Cinémathèque Française. Blanchet was inspired by Robert Flaherty, and the Direct Cinema tradition of Richard Leacock, D. A. Pennebaker, Michel Brault and Pierre Perrault.

While teaching cinema practice at Paris X Nanterre with Jean Rouch from 1969 to 1978 and documentary filmmaking at IDHEC, and elaborating his own practice as a filmmaker, Blanchet began working as cameraman and sound engineer. He won the Sadoul Prize for Histoire de Wahari in 1974 and became a member of the jury where he remained until 1989.

In 1978, through the teaching practices from Paris X Nanterre, he co-founded the international film school Ateliers Varan with Jean Rouch, J-P Beauviala, Jacques D'Arthuys, his brother Severin Blanchet, and a number of their students from Nanterre. Blanchet became one of the main founders of the school's particular filmmaking pedagogy, and his pedagogical principles are still put into action today. He continued teaching at Ateliers Varan until his death.

In the mid-1980s, with the royalties from his latest fiction, he bought all the microphones on the market, took them apart to find out how they work - and why they don't work well enough. He developed a series of microphones, built on new principles, and used them in his own films, generally mounted directly on a small video camera. The sound is particularly transparent and the mikes produce an auditory "depth of field" that makes them particularly suited for one-person film crews. A number of filmmakers started using the microphones, among them, Richard Leacock. He also developed a series of serial microphones for acoustic instruments, and made sound recordings for e.g. Randy Weston, Richard Leacock & Sarah Caldwell, Jean-Louis Aubert and Alain Roudier. The microphones were patented, but have never been put into industrial production.

Vincent Blanchet features in Les Favoris de la Lune (Otar Iosseliani, France / Italy, 1984), La Petite Minute de Bonheur (Laurence Attali, 1991) and Zuneigung—Die Filmemacherin Gisela Tuchtenhagen (Quinka F. Stoehr).

== Selected filmography ==
=== Director & cinematographer ===
- 1962-1967: Short fiction films: Le brasseur, Trépidante et mystérieuse Afrique and Le petit déjeuner sur l'herbe
- 1969: De'Arua, 23 min., with Jean Monod. CNRS Images.
- 1973: Tabarin, performance video, with Daved Esrig, Théâtre National Chaillot
- 1974: La Draille, 60 min., with Jean Monod
- 1975: Histoire de Wahari, 75 min., with Jean Monod. CNRS. Diffusion: Seine Cinéma. Award: Prix Georges Sadoul
- 1976: Wind water and sun, performance video with Carolyn Carlson, Paris Opera
- 1977: Geel, long version: 90 min., TV version: 3 x 52 min., with André Van In. Prod.: Aaton, INA, CBC. Diffusion : Cinéma St Séverin, RTF, RTB.
- 1979: Les Lilas et tout, 60 min., with Séverin Blanchet.
- 1982: La casa del arbol, 20 min.
- 1983: Oublie les dix ans qui viennent, fiction, 90 min., broadcast: France 2.
- 1990: De l’arbre au violon – ou comment rester soi-même quand on fréquente Stradivarius, 52 min. Yumi Productions/ARTE.
- 1993: Ainsi va la terre, 58 min., with Perle Møhl. Prod.: Yumi Productions/ARTE. Award: Cinema du Réel.
- 1999: Le Château des Schÿler, 59 min. Arts Maillot Production/ARTE.
- 1999: Une femme d'influence, 42 min. Arts Maillot Production/ARTE.
- 1999: A l’ouest d’Allah aka Ici pour toujours, 58 min. Arts Maillot Production/ARTE.
- 2006: Parole, l’héritage Dolto, 97 min. Yumi Productions/MK2.
- 2006: La liste noire du Commissaire, 52 min. Arts Maillot Production/France 5.

=== Cinematographer ===
- 1972: Les Eléments by J. C. Rosé.
- 1973: Le Corps blessé by J. C. Rosé.
- 1974: Et les chiens se taisent by S. Maldoror.
- 1975: Her sumana, by Amadou Sumana; La Vie au Ralenti, by J. C. Rosé; Judith à Fond de Train by E. Kapnist.
- 1988: La carrese by G. di Nella.
- 1991: Drôle de Nuit by E. Kapnist.

=== Sound engineer ===
- 1976: Chantons sous l'Occupation by André Halimi.
- 1992: Marrakech in the cool of the evening and The Splendid Master Gnawa Musicians of Morocco, CDs by Randy Weston, Verve/Polygram.
- 1996: A Musical Adventure in Siberia by Richard Leacock.
- 1997: Teko Dzembia, recording and masterisation of CD for the Amerindiens Emerillon/Teko, French Guiana. Distribution: Semeïon Editions.
- 2001: Musiques Cubaines, sound & image, musical film series for Anicinapé Productions. Diffusion: Mezzo.
- 2002: Taxi Parisien de Robert Bozzi.
- 2012: Confluences by Perle Møhl, mixing, Studios de la Vanne.

=== Actor ===
- 1984 Les Favoris de la lune by Otar Iosseliani
- 1991 La Petite Minute de bonheur by Laurence Attali

=== Film Scripts ===
- La Derive des continents with Jean-François Goyet
- Anaconda et Jaguar with Ti'iwan Couchili & Perle Møhl
