= Dionysos (film) =

- Theatrical release poster
- Directed by: Jean Rouch
- Written by: Euzhan Palcy; Jean Rouch
- Produced by: Pierre Braunberger
- Starring: Jean Monod; Hélène Puiseux
- Cinematography: Philippe Costantini; Jean Rouch
- Edited by: Marie-Josèphe Yoyotte
- Music by: Mauricio Smith
- Production company: Les Films du Jeudi
- Release dates: 1984 (Venice); 3 December 1986
- Running time: 104 minutes
- Country: France
- Languages: French; English

Dionysos is a 1984 French comedy film directed by Jean Rouch, starring Jean Monod and Hélène Puiseux. It tells the story of an American drama teacher who after writing a thesis on Dionysus tries to combine Dionysian rites with the work at a car factory, in an attempt to create the world's first car built in joyous frenzy. The film competed at the 41st Venice International Film Festival. It was released in France on 3 December 1986.

== Cast ==
- Jean Monod as Hugh Gray
- Hélène Puiseux as Ariane
- Cookie Chiapalone as one of three maenads
- Fifi Niane Raliatou as one of three maenads
- Kagumi Onodera as one of three maenads
- Germaine Dieterlen as member of the teachers' choir
- Roger Foucher as member of the teachers' choir
- Enrico Fulchignoni as member of the teachers' choir

== Reception ==
Harlan Kennedy of American Cinema Papers described the film as "entirely lunatic" in his report from Venice, and wrote: "It's like a 60s hippy charging round the icon-scape of 80s Capitalism with a Super-8 camera and hoping meaning will accrue from the whir of disconnected imagery."
