= Gardens in Autumn =

Jardins en automne
- Directed by: Otar Iosseliani
- Written by: Otar Iosseliani
- Produced by: Martin Marinyak; Maurice Tinshant; Roberto Chikutto
- Starring: Séverin Blanchet; Jacynthe Jacquet
- Cinematography: William Lubtchansky
- Edited by: Otar Iosseliani; Ewa Lenkiewicz
- Music by: Nicolas Zourabichvili
- Distributed by: Les Films du Losange
- Release date: 6 September 2006
- Running time: 115 minutes
- Country: France
- Language: French

Gardens in Autumn (French: Jardins en automne) is a 2006 French comedy film directed by Otar Iosseliani.

== Cast ==
- Séverin Blanchet as Vincent, le ministre
- Jacynthe Jacquet as Barbara, la balayeuse
- Otar Iosseliani as Arnaud
- Lily Lavina as Mathilde, la rousse
- Denis Lambert as Gégé, le bistrotier
- Michel Piccoli as Marie, la mère de Vincent
- Pascal Vincent as Théodière, le deuxième ministre
