= La neve nel bicchiere =

- Directed by: Florestano Vancini
- Starring: Massimo Ghini
- Music by: Carlo Rustichelli; Paolo Rustichelli
- Release date: 1984
- Country: Italy
- Language: Italian

La neve nel bicchiere is a 1984 Italian drama film directed by Florestano Vancini. It is based on an eponymous novel written by Nerino Rossi.

The film entered the competition at the 41st Venice International Film Festival.
