= Farewell, Home Sweet Home =

1999 film

Farewell, Home Sweet Home (Adieu, plancher des vaches!)
- Film poster
- Directed by: Otar Iosseliani
- Written by: Otar Iosseliani
- Produced by: Martine Marignac
- Starring: Nico Tarielashvili
- Cinematography: William Lubtchansky
- Edited by: Otar Iosseliani
- Music by: Nicolas Zourabichvili
- Distributed by: Les Films du Losange
- Release date: May 1999
- Running time: 118 minutes
- Country: France
- Language: French
- Budget: $3.8 million
- Box office: $698,000

Farewell, Home Sweet Home (French: Adieu, plancher des vaches!) is a 1999 French comedy film directed by Otar Iosseliani. It was screened out of competition at the 1999 Cannes Film Festival.

== Cast ==
- Nico Tarielashvili as Son
- Lily Lavina as Mother
- Philippe Bas as Moto driver
- Stephanie Hainque as Girl at bar
- Mirabelle Kirkland as Maid
- Amiran Amiranashvili as Hobo
- Joachim Salinger as Beggar
- Emmanuel de Chauvigny as Lover
- Otar Iosseliani as Father
