= Brigands (film) =

- Directed by: Otar Iosseliani
- Written by: Otar Iosseliani
- Produced by: Valerio De Paolis; Martin Marinyak; Armen Medvedev
- Starring: Amiran Amiranashvili; Davit Gogibedashvili; Giorgi Tsintsadze
- Cinematography: William Lubtchansky
- Edited by: Mari-Agnes Blum; Otar Iosseliani
- Music by: Nicolas Zourabichvili
- Distributed by: Pierre Grise Distribution
- Release date: 1996
- Running time: 129 minutes
- Country: France

Brigands, chapitre VII (internationally released as Brigands) is a 1996 French drama film written and directed by Otar Iosseliani.

The film entered the competition at the 53rd Venice International Film Festival, where it received the Special Jury Prize.

== Cast ==
- Amiran Amiranashvili as Vano
- Davit Gogibedashvili as Sandro
- Giorgi Tsintsadze as Spiridon
- Nino Ordjonikidze as Eka
- Aleksi Jakeli as Viktor
