= La Chasse aux papillons =

- Film poster
- Directed by: Otar Iosseliani
- Written by: Otar Iosseliani
- Produced by: Pierre-André Boutang; Luciano Gloor; Patrick Lot; Martine Marignac; Ettore Rosboch; Lilia Smecchia; Guy Séligmann; Maurice Tinchant
- Starring: Narda Blanchet; Pierrette Pompom Bailhache; Aleksandr Cherkasov; Thamara Tarassachvili
- Cinematography: William Lubtchansky
- Edited by: Nathalie Alquier; Otar Iosseliani; Jocelyne Ruiz; Ursula West
- Music by: Nicholas Zourabichvili
- Production companies: Pierre Grise Productions; Metropolis Filmproduction; Best International; Centre National de la Cinématographie; Eurimages; France 3 Cinéma; Istituto Luce; Ital-Noleggio Cinematografico; RAI Rete 1 TV; Sodaperaga Productions
- Distributed by: Pierre Grise Distribution
- Release date: September 5, 1992 (Italy)
- Running time: 115 minutes
- Country: France
- Language: French

La Chasse aux papillons is a 1992 French drama film written and directed by Otar Iosseliani.

== Plot ==
Two older women, Marie-Agnès de Bayonette (Thamara Tarassachvili) and her cousin Solange (Narda Blanchet) live in a villa nestled in the hills over a nearby village. Surrounded by the wealth, memories, and treasures collected over their lifetimes, they purposely ignore real estate development interests from the nearby town, specially those led by repeated efforts of the local magistrate who urges them to sell their home to a Japanese investment group. They survive financially by the occasional sale of a piece of antique furniture. When Marie-Agnès dies unexpectedly, Solange has to deal with an heir from Moscow and renewed efforts that the estate be sold.

== Cast ==
In casting his films, Otar Iosseliani admitted to preferring unknowns, feeling that a famous name could be equated to hiring a whore. In wishing to have viewer's feel like they were watching not actors but people, his casts were recruited mainly from his personal address book.

- Narda Blanchet as Solange
- Pierrette Pompom Bailhache as Valérie
- Aleksandr Cherkasov as Henri de Lampadere
- Thamara Tarassachvili as Marie-Agnès de Bayonette
- Alexandra Liebermann as Hélène
- Lilia Ollivier as Olga
- Emmanuel de Chauvigny as Father André
- Sacha Piatigorsky as Sultan
- Anne-Marie Eisenschitz as Marie
- Françoise Tsouladzé as Yvonne
- Maimouna N'Diaye as Caprice
- Yannick Carpentier as Monsieur Capentier

== Release ==
The film had multiple international releases 1992 through 1995, and screened at the Thessaloniki International Film Festival in 2003. Its original French release title is La Chasse aux papillons, but it also screened as A Caça às Borboletas in Portugal, as Caccia alle farfalle in Italy, Jagd auf Schmetterlinge in Germany, as Kelebek avi in Turkey, as Lepkevadászat in Hungary, as Nadiroba peplebze (ნადირობა პეპლებზე) in Georgia, as Охота на бабочек in Russia, as Polowanie na motyle in Poland, and as To kynigi tis petaloudas in Greece. In English it was released as The Butterfly Hunt, Hunting Butterflies, and Chasing Butterflies.

== Recognition ==
=== Critical response ===
The film was shown in 1993 Moscow International Film Festival as a part of the program which demonstrated award-winning 1992 films. In the reaction, it was noted that the film is typical for Otar Iosseliani in the sense that it gives the notion of the rytmus. The best scenes of the film are those where no dramatic action occurs. It was also noted that France as shown by Iosseliani is very much like Georgia as shown by him in previous films.

=== Awards and nominations ===
- 1992, won a Confédération Internationale des Cinemas d'Art et d 'Essai (C.I.C.A.E.) Award at 49th Venice Film Festival
- 1992, won Pasinetti Award for 'Best Film' at Venice Film Festival
- 1993, received a European Film Award nomination for 'Best Achievement' from European Film Academy
- 1993, won Andrei Tarkovsky Award at Moscow International Film Festival
- 1993, received a Nika Award nomination for 'Best Film' from Russian Academy of Cinema Arts and Sciences.
