= Paar (film) =

1984 Indian Hindi film by Goutam Ghose

- Poster
- Directed by: Goutam Ghose
- Written by: Goutam Ghose; Partho Mukherjee; Partha Banerjee
- Dialogues by: Surendra Pratap Singh
- Based on: Paari (also spelled Paarhi) by Samaresh Basu
- Produced by: Swapan Sarkar
- Starring: Shabana Azmi; Naseeruddin Shah; Om Puri; Utpal Dutt
- Cinematography: Goutam Ghose
- Edited by: Prasanta Dey
- Music by: Goutam Ghose
- Production company: Orchid Films Pvt. Ltd.
- Release date: 21 May 1984
- Running time: 141 minutes
- Country: India
- Language: Hindi

Paar (transl. The Crossing) is a 1984 Indian Hindi-language drama film directed by Goutam Ghose and produced by Swapan Sarkar through Orchid Films. Written by Ghose with Partha Banerjee and Partho Mukherjee, the film stars Shabana Azmi, Naseeruddin Shah and Om Puri. Naseeruddin Shah won a Volpi Cup for his role as Naurangia. The film is based on the Bengali-language short story "Paari" by Samaresh Basu.

== Plot ==
The film of exploitation in rural Bihar, in which a landlord (Utpal Dutt)’s men wreck a village by giving villagers lesser remuneration than what they should actually get as per government law. A local school teacher (Anil Chatterjee) fights for the deceived lower caste villagers and helps one of them - Ram Naresh (Om Puri) to become the Panchayat pradhan.

Later on the benevolent schoolmaster (Anil Chatterjee), the progressive force in the village, was killed by landlord's men. The labourer Naurangia (Naseeruddin Shah) breaks with a tradition to passive resistance and retaliates by killing the landlord's brother Hari Singh (Mohan Agashe). Naurangia and his pregnant wife Rama (Shabana Azmi) become fugitives from justice and flee from the village as per Naurangia's parent's advice. They eventually moved to Calcutta to find for a job in Nadia Jute mill, Naihati but due to the deteriorating condition of jute mills Naurangia fails to get a job there and struggles for survival.

After many efforts to find sustenance elsewhere, the two decide to return home. To earn the fare, they agree to drive the herd of pigs through the river, causing the pregnant Rama to believe she has lost her baby (They already lost their first child at age 3 due to a fall into the well). But they have to swim across a wide, swiftly flowing river Ganga, in which they nearly drown before reaching safety. At the end of the film, Naurangia puts his ear to her belly and listens to the heartbeat of the unborn baby.

== Cast ==
- Naseeruddin Shah as Naurangia
- Shabana Azmi as Rama
- Om Puri as Ram Naresh (Village Pradhan)
- Utpal Dutt as Landlord
- Anil Chatterjee as Schoolmaster
- Mohan Agashe as Hari, Landlord's brother
- Kamu Mukherjee as Jute mill Sardar
- Ruma Guha Thakurta as Schoolmaster's wife
- Usha Ganguly as Wife of a jute mill worker
- Rupa Ganguly (Note: She is Ashok Kumar's daughter, not the famous Indian actress Roopa Ganguly.)
- Kalyan Chatterjee
- Sunil Mukherjee as Kolkata pavement dweller
- Bimal Deb as Agent of piggery

== Production ==
=== Development ===
While reading about caste atrocities in Bihar in a weekly magazine called Sunday, Ghose wanted to make a documentary, but was unsure it'd reach a wider audience.

He then thought of Samaresh Basu’s Bengali short story, Paari and adapted it into a screenplay with co-writer Partha Banerjee, adding the back-story of the couple's journey to the city.

When Basu read the screenplay, he was sceptical about how Ghose would film the climax.

=== Casting ===
Naseeruddin Shah lost several kilos on a "protein-loaded diet" as part of the preparation for his role.

“What I did for Paar was to evoke the muscle memory of having to dig a hole in the ground for water to pass through and to study the physiques and body language of such people,” Shah said, in an interview with the Sight and Sound magazine of the British Film Institute. “I worked very hard, lost a lot of weight and exercised strenuously. I had to look like a man who had not eaten anything but puffed rice and sugarless tea for years.”

== Music ==
Apart from co-writing, directing and cinematography, Ghose also composed the music of the film.

=== Personnel ===
- Music by Goutam Ghose.
- Orchestra arranged and conducted by Aloke Nath Dey.
- Songs rendered by Ranjana Sen, Partha Sengupta and Shabana Azmi.

== Release ==
The film released on 21 May 1984. It was screened at the 41st Venice International Film Festival, where Naseeruddin Shah won the Volpi Cup for Best Actor for his performance in the film.

== Accolades ==
Year	Award	Category	Nominee(s)	Result	Ref.
1984	Venice International Film Festival	Golden Lion	Goutam Ghose	Nominated	
1984	Venice International Film Festival	UNESCO Award	Goutam Ghose	Won	
1984	Venice International Film Festival	Volpi Cup for Best Actor	Naseeruddin Shah	Won	
1985	National Film Awards	Best Feature Film in Hindi	Goutam Ghose and Swapan Sarkar	Won	
1985	National Film Awards	Best Actor	Naseeruddin Shah	Won	
1985	National Film Awards	Best Actress	Shabana Azmi	Won	
1986	Bengal Film Journalists' Association Awards	Best Actor	Naseeruddin Shah	Won	
1986	Bengal Film Journalists' Association Awards	Best Actress	Shabana Azmi	Won	
1986	Filmfare Awards	Best Screenplay	Goutam Ghose and Partha Banerjee	Won	

== Legacy ==
The retrospective reception towards Paar has been overwhelmingly positive.

Paar still remains one of the rare films in the Hindi cinema to have shown anxieties navigated by the migrant workers of India, especially in a pre-COVID-19 landscape.

Naseeruddin Shah continues to be the only Indian to date to win the Best Actor award at the Venice Film Festival (for Paar).

The film was successfully saved from becoming a lost film with restoration efforts made by the National Film Archive of India (NFAI), Prasad Laboratories and Ghose himself.
