= Anna (1970 film) =

1970 Finnish film

- Directed by: Jörn Donner
- Written by: Jörn Donner; Eija-Elina Bergholm
- Starring: Harriet Andersson; Pertti Melasniemi; Marja Packalén
- Release date: 23 October 1970
- Running time: 82 minutes
- Country: Finland
- Languages: Finnish, Swedish

Anna is a 1970 Finnish movie co-written by Jörn Donner and Eija-Elina Bergholm, and directed by Donner, featuring Harriet Andersson, Pertti Melasniemi and Marja Packalén. It was filmed in Kustavi and Turku, Finland. There was controversy about the nudity in the film. It has been described as "perhaps [Donner's] most thoughtful film", and been listed among "the most important films made in Finland in the 1960s and 1970s".

Both Finnish-language and Swedish-language versions were made of the film. In the Finnish version, Andersson's lines are voiced by Liisamaija Laaksonen.

== Plot ==
Thirty-eight-year-old Anna Kivi (Harriet Andersson), a Finnish anesthesiologist at Turku University Hospital and divorcée recently awarded a doctorate after her thesis, retreats to a summer studio on an island for the annual national summer holiday where she contemplates modern hardships and Northern European socialism.
