= Monday Morning (2002 film) =

- Directed by: Otar Iosseliani
- Written by: Otar Iosseliani
- Produced by: Martin Marinyak; Roberto Chikutto; Luigi Musini
- Starring: Jacques Bidou; Anne Kravz-Tarnavsky
- Cinematography: William Lubtchansky
- Edited by: Otar Iosseliani; Ewa Lenkiewicz
- Music by: Nicolas Zourabichvili
- Distributed by: Les Films du Losange
- Release date: 14 February 2002 (BIFF)
- Running time: 120 minutes
- Country: France
- Language: French

Monday Morning (French: Lundi matin) is a 2002 French comedy film directed by Otar Iosseliani.

== Awards ==
At the 2002 Berlin International Film Festival the film won the following awards:

- Silver Bear for Best Director for Otar Iosseliani
- FIPRESCI award
