= Ateliers Varan =

French film school

- Formation: 1981
- Founder: Jean Rouch
- Purpose: Offers academic hands-on courses in documentary filmmaking
- Headquarters: Paris, France
- Website: ateliersvaran.com

Ateliers Varan is an association of filmmakers based in Paris, France, whose primary work is running non-academic hands-on courses in documentary filmmaking both in France and across the world. Founded in 1981 with the spirit and support of Jean Rouch, it has trained generations of documentary filmmakers in places ranging from Vietnam to Kenya, Serbia, Georgia and Afghanistan.

Ateliers Varan acts as a consultant to UNESCO and sets up workshops abroad in collaboration with the Communication Department of the Ministry of Foreign Affairs of France. It is a member of CILECT.

== History ==
In 1978, the newly independent Mozambican Republic asked famous French directors to make films about the changes occurring there. Among those was Jean Rouch, who instead offered to train the country’s future filmmakers, enabling them to film reality from the inside. Together with Jacques d’Arthuys, France’s Cultural Attaché to Mozambique, he set up a documentary filmmaking workshop which would teach filmmaking through practice and collaboration.

Following that experience, the filmmakers who helped run this workshop set up an association in Paris in 1981. Their mission was to run similar courses in France and continue their activities throughout the developing world, sharing and enriching experiences.

Since its inception, Ateliers Varan have trained more than 800 filmmakers and produced more than 800 documentary films.

The name Ateliers Varan refers to the varanus, the carnivorous lizard found only in Africa and Asia.

== List of Varan workshops abroad ==
- Mexico (1980)
- Brazil (1981)
- Portugal (1981, 1982, 2004 and 2006)
- Kenya (1982)
- Philippines (1982, 1983)
- Bolivia (1983)
- Norway (1983, 1985)
- South Africa (1985, 1986)
- Papua New Guinea (1987)
- New Caledonia (1992)
- Romania (1994)
- Cambodia (1994)
- Colombia (2000)
- Mauritius (2000)
- Venezuela (2002)
- Vietnam (2004, 2005, 2006 and 2008–2009)
- Serbia (2004, 2005, and a workshop for the former Yugoslav region in 2007)
- South Caucasus: Georgia, Armenia, Azerbaijan (2006)
- Afghanistan (2006, 2007–2008 and 2010)
- Algeria (2007–2008)
- Morocco (2008)

== Prominent members ==
Together with Jean Rouch, one of the founding members was the French filmmaker Séverin Blanchet, who was killed in a suicide attack in Kabul in February 2010, while working on a new Varan workshop in Afghanistan.

Prominent former and current members include directors Jean-Louis Comolli, Mariana Otero, Daniele Incalcaterra, Vincent Blanchet, André van In, Pierre Baudry, Leonardo Di Costanzo and Claire Simon.
