= Eija-Elina Bergholm =

Finnish director and screenwriter

- Born: Eija-Elina Anneli Neuvonen; 27 April 1943 (age 81); Lahti, Finland
- Occupation(s): Filmmaker stage director
- Awards: Finnish State Film Prize (1973, 1988, 1991)

Eija-Elina Anneli Bergholm (née Neuvonen, born 27 April 1943) is a Finnish director and screenwriter.

== Life and career ==
Born in Lahti, Bergholm studied art history and drama at the University of Helsinki and drama at the Finnish Theater Institute, graduating in 1965. She started her career working as a television director and serving as artistic director for the Helsinki Student Theatre. She made her film debut as a screenwriter in 1968, with the critical acclaimed Punahilkka directed by her first husband Timo Bergholm, which was followed one year later by the controversial but commercially successful Jörn Donner's film Anna.

Bergholm made her directorial film debut in 1972 with Marja pieni!, which won several awards and was the first Finnish film directed by a woman and based on her own story; her second feature film, Angela's War (Angelas Krig / Angelan Sota, 1984), was entered into the main competition at the 41st edition of the Venice Film Festival. Beyond her work for cinema, in her home country she is also well known for the television works she wrote and directed for the Finnish Broadcasting Company from the late 1970s.
