= David Dephy =

Georgian - American poet and writer

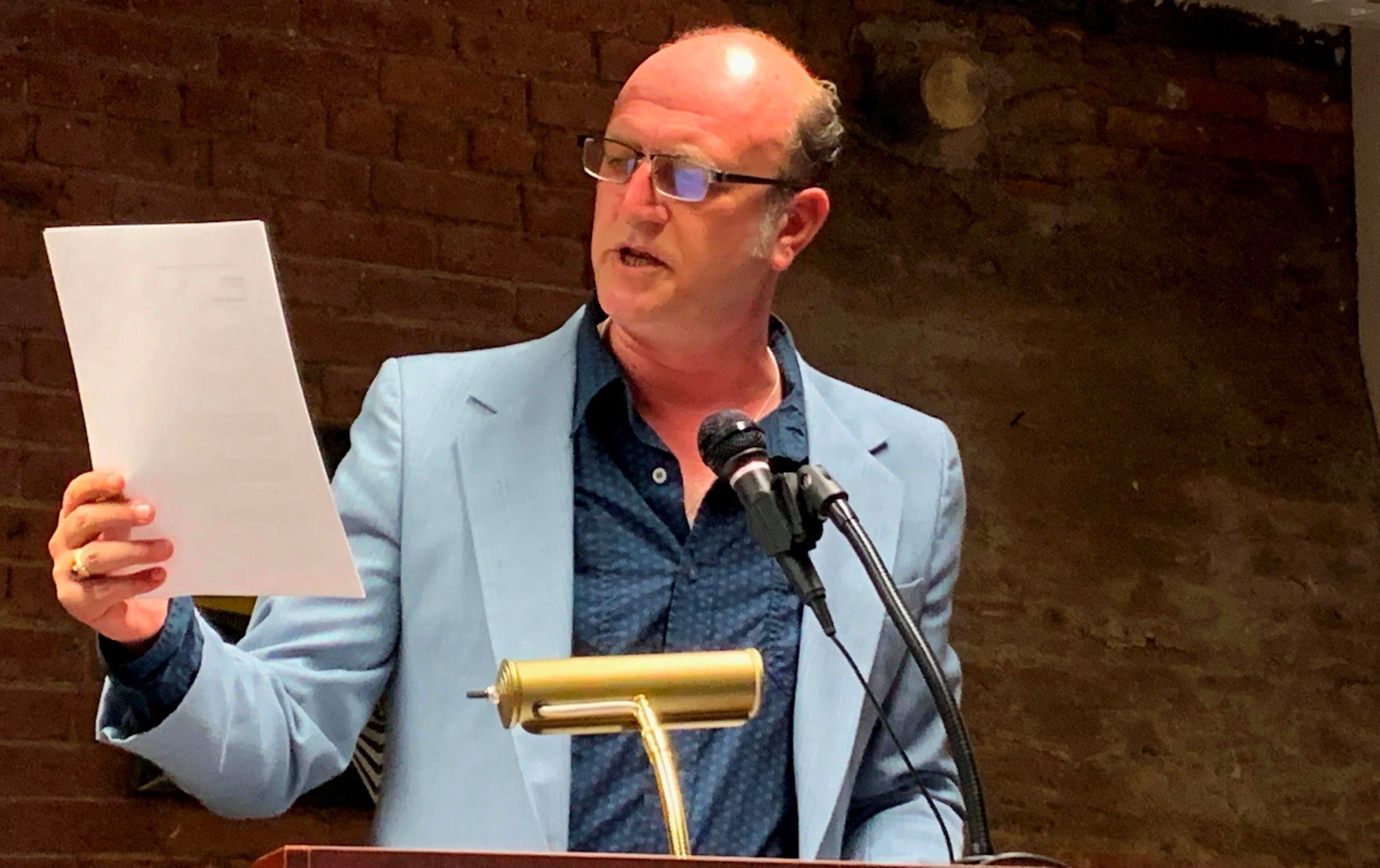

David Dephy (Georgian: დავით დეფი, born June 21, 1968), also known as David Dephy Gogibedashvili, is a Georgian / American poet, novelist, essayist, performer, multimedia artist, painter, the founder of Poetry Orchestra and the poetic order Samcaully. He is the author of eight novels and seventeen collections of verse and three poetry audio albums with orchestra and electronic bands. Named as Literature Luminary by Bowery Poetry, Stellar Poet by Voices of Poetry, Incomparable Poet by Statorec, Brilliant Grace by Headline Poetry & Press, and Extremely Unique Poetic Voice by Cultural Daily. He lives and works in New York City, USA.

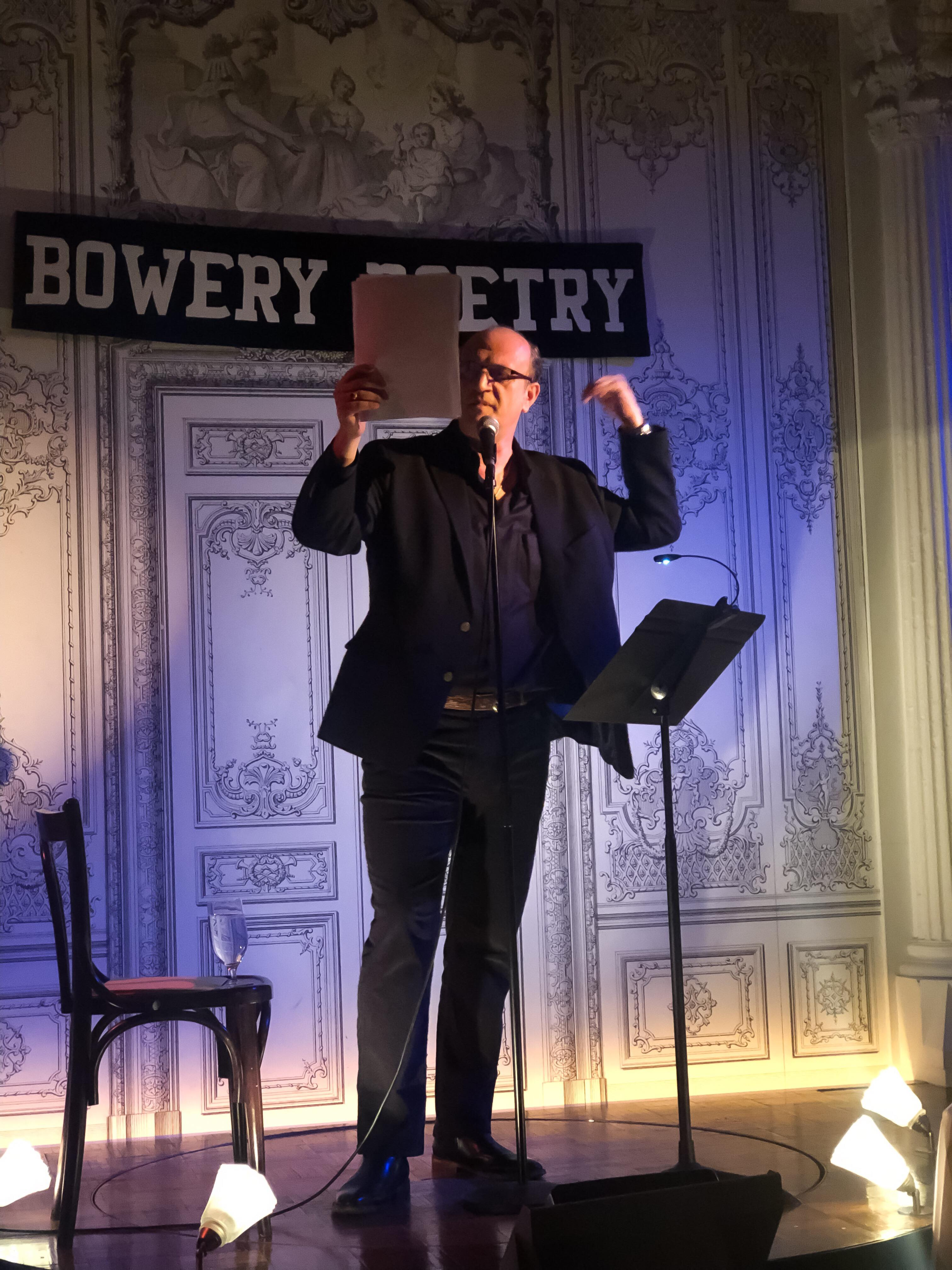

== Biography ==
David Dephy was born in Tbilisi. He earned his Master of Fine Arts degree in 1992 from the Faculty of Architecture at the Tbilisi State Academy of Fine Arts. He began his career working in print media, radio, and television, where he created the program მზეRA (Mze-Ra) for the Georgian television station Meore Archi. From 1995 to 2000, he worked in cinema, collaborating with internationally famous film directors Otar Ioseliani and Nana Jorjadze, among others.

He was a leader of the Disobedience Committee during the Rose Revolution in 2003, and during the Russian invasion of Georgia in 2008, he joined the army of volunteers and set up a Headquarters of Civil Solidarity under his famous slogan "Stop Russia."

In 2010–2011, Dephy was an artist-in-residence at the writers’ society Ledig House in Ghent, New York. His short story "Before the End" was chosen for inclusion in the anthology Best European Fiction 2012, edited by Aleksandar Hemon and prefaced by Nicole Krauss and published in the U.S. by Dalkey Archive Press as well as in Dalkey's anthology Contemporary Georgian Fiction, edited and translated by Elizabeth Heighway. That same year, Dephy was invited to participate in the PEN World Voices Festival in New York City, where he presented a live poetry event entitled "The Second Skin" with Laurie Anderson, Yusef Komunyakaa and Salman Rushdie at 92nd Street Y

Dephy's works have been published and anthologized in the U.S., UK, Mexico, Germany, Brazil. India, Ukraine, Georgia, New Zealand, and Colombia by many literary magazines, journals, and publishing houses. From 2015 to 2017, he served as the Creative Consultant for Poetry & Prose at the University of Georgia. In 2017, he was chosen as an Ambassador of Poetry by Julius Meinl, and his live performance of The Poet King – The Easter Verses at the Peace Cathedral of Georgia and the Evangelical-Baptist Church of Georgia led to his poetry officially being included in the Divine Liturgies. Dephy was collaborating with Georgian rock bands Lady Heroin, The Sanda, and Homospouses on a bilingual English/Georgian multimedia project.

In 2017, David Dephy was exiled from his native country of Georgia and was granted immediate and indefinite political asylum in the U.S. His wife and 9-year-old son joined him in the U.S. in 2023, after seven years of exile. He lives and works in New York City. USCIS Artistic Freedom Initiative

David Dephy is an author of seventeen books of poetry, eight novels, and three audio albums of poetry in Georgian and English.

He is a founder of poetic multimedia projects Poetry Orchestra and American Poetry Intersection, which were named "A Triumphant", "A Revolutionary," and "An Innovation in the World of Poetry" by Cultural Daily Los Angeles. An active collaborator with Saphileaum and Irakli Gabriel.

He holds a master's degree in fine arts, evaluated by Globe Language Services in New York, and is enrolled at City University of New York / CUNY - Brooklyn College in the art education certification program.

He served as a Poet-in-Residence for Brownstone Poets 2024 - 2026 and was a Featured Poet and Stipend Recipient at Walt Whitman Birthplace Association 2023, Huntington Station, New York. His poetry work A Sense of Purpose has been sent to the Moon by The Lunar Codex, NASA, Polaris Trilogy, and Poetry on Brick Street on January 15, 2025, at 1:11 a.m. from NASA's Kennedy Space Center.

His works have appeared in numerous literary journals and anthologies in the US and UK, and worldwide, and have been included in the after-class reading list for several universities, including International Poetry Review (Tufts University and the University of North Carolina Greensboro), Stanford University Poetry Media Lab, Shenandoah, Sampsonia Way, North Dakota Quarterly, Straylight Literary Magazine by the University of Wisconsin, and Kansas City Review, Hudson Valley Writers Guild, and others.

He lives and works in New York City.

Prizes won:

New York Edge Art Award 2026. This award celebrates professionals who have made a meaningful impact by supporting and championing poetry and the arts this school year.

New York Nassau County Poet Laureate Award 2026. In recognition of outstanding work in poetry.

The Nelson Mandela Premium Award 2022. On the occasion of Nelson Mandela International Day, July 18 - "In recognition of the valuable contribution to the promotion of Peace and Equality through Literature, especially in support of Ukraine during this unfortunate war." The International Forum for Creativity and Humanity, Kingdom of Morocco.

The full-length poetry work A Double Meaning, with co-author Joshua Corwin, was named a Finalist of the American Book Fest 2023 / International Book Awards in the category of Poetry: Narrative

The Pushcart Prize Nomination for the poetry work Time Is Heart published by Brownstone Poets Anthology, 2023. New York, USA.

The 1st Place Winner of The Artists Forum Poetry Award, 2021. New York, USA.

The Finalist and Shortlist Winner Nominee of the Adelaide Literary Awards New York for the category of Best Poem. 2020/2021. USA.

A Winner of the Finalist Award in the 2020 Best Book Award National Contest by American Book Fest. USA.

A Winner of the 2019 Spillwords Press Poetry American Award as June's Publication of the Month. Spillwords Press. New York, USA.

The Favorite Poem, 2020 by Dissonance Magazine. Kent, UK.

The Finalist of the Adelaide Literary Award Anthology, 2019 for the category of Best Poem. Adelaide Books/Adelaide Magazine. New York, USA.

The Editor's Choice Poem 2019 by Vita Brevis Magazine. New York, USA.

Has been nominated as an Author of The Year/Month by Spilwords Press, four-time in a row, 2019/2020. New York, USA.

Best European Fiction 2012, edited by Aleksandar Hemon and prefaced by Nicole Krauss, Dalkey Archive Press. Chicago, USA.

By decree #11-16-04 of November 16, 2013 of the President of Georgia Mikheil Saakashvili, David Dephy had been awarded The Order of Honour (certificate #081887 The Order of Honour #1737)

Named as Literature Luminary by Bowery Poetry, Stellar Poet by Voices of Poetry, Incomparable Poet by Statorec, Brilliant Grace by Headline Poetry & Press and Extremely Unique Poetic Voice by Cultural Daily.

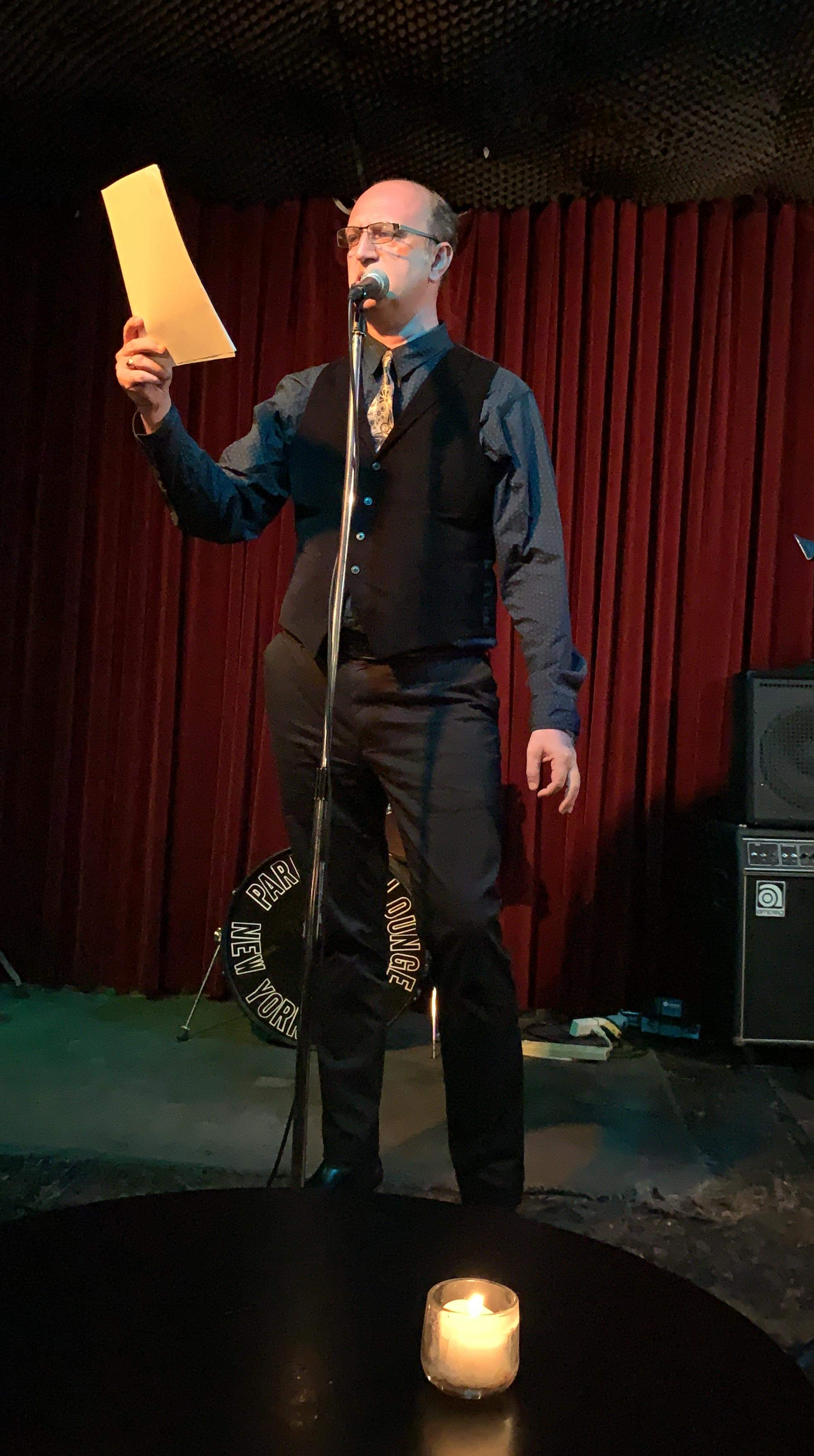

== Books Published by Westbrae Literary Group USA ==
- Westbrae Literary Group - The Author's Page
- Gemini Touch, A Novella. 2026
- Rays Never Were So Near As Now, Poetry. 2025
- Westbrae Literary Group - Poetry of War and Hope: Exploring the Work of David Dephy

== Poetry & Prose Major Publications ==
- 2026: Gemini Touch, novella. Westbrae Literary Group.
- 2025: Rays Never Were So Near As Now, poems. Westbrae Literary Group.
- 2024: The Spirit of Silence, a concept album of poetry by Poetry Orchestra.
- 2023: The Songs of the American Prophets, a concept album of poetry by Poetry Orchestra.
- 2022: A Double Meaning, poems with co-author Joshua Corwin.
- 2020: Eastern Star, poems.
- 2018: The Same Fable, poems.
- 2016: Crowned, a novel.
- 2016: The Poet King, a poem.
- 2015: Absolute New York, poems.
- 2015: The Easter Verses, poems.
- 2014: God Is Among You, poems.
- 2014: The Society of the End and the Beginning, a novel.
- 2014: All the World’s Mysteries, a novel.
- 2012: We Will All Get Out Of Here Alive, poems.
- 2012: Before the End, Contemporary Georgian Fiction and Best European Fiction 2012; English language translation by Elizabeth Heighway and Tsiasana Gabunia.
- 2011: Sevdya, poems.
- 2010:The Gardens and the Pandemonium, a novel.
- 2010: DNA Symphony, poems.
- 2010: Da Iq Tsa, poems.
- 2009: Daphiony - Supernova Domine, an audio poetry album with orchestra and electronic band.
- 2008: Demna Gedevanischvili, a novel.
- 2007: Samkauly, poems.
- 2004: Trilogy: And, There, and Heaven, poems.
- 2003: Let My Twin Find Me, a novel.
- 2003: Words Words Words, stories, the dialogues with the characters of the books.
- 2003: Emerald and Sapphire, poems.
- 2003: Expecting Miracles At Dawn, a novel.
- 2003: The December Talisman, a novel.
- 1996: Stories and Conceptions, stories & essays.
- 1995: The Grotesque, stories.
- 1994: Dead Time, essays.

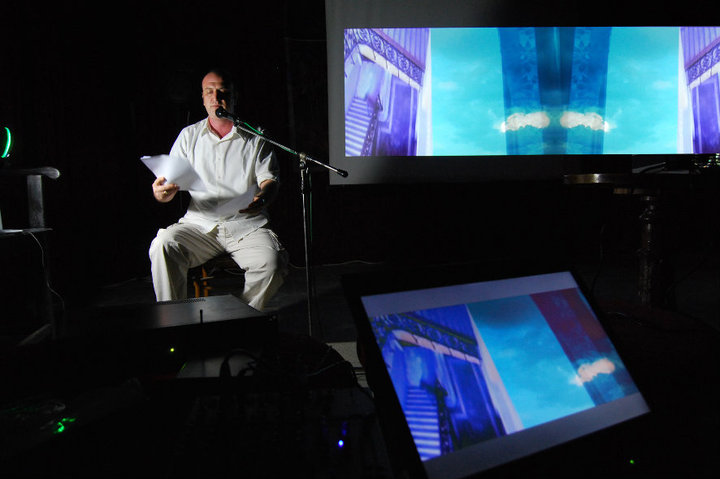

== Poetry Video Art & Multi-Media Projects ==
- 2016–Present: Poetry Orchestra An Award-winning Multimedia Poetry Video Art Project. Author, Director, Producer.
- 2002-2003: Hero Late Night Multimedia Show. Author, Director, Anchor.
- 2000-2002: The Open Door Night Late Night Show. Author, Director, Anchor.
- 1997: Carlos Castaneda's Separate Reality Poetry Video Art. Director.
- 1996-1997: Strawbery Fields Late Night Multimedia Show. Author, Director, Anchor.
- 1992-1994: მზე-RA Late Night Multimedia Show. Author, Director, Anchor.

== FilmFreeway ==
- David Dephy's Poetry Orchestra and solo works, video poetry films, poetry video art

== Filmography ==
- 1993: Mandalla | Director Mamuka Berika
- 1996: Winner of the Grand Prix at the Venice Film Festival
- 1996: Brigands, Chapitre VII | Director Otar Ioseliani
- 2000: 27 Missing Kisses | Director: Nana Jorjadze
- 2002: Drongo | Director: Zinovi Roizman
- 2004: Delirium | Director: Tornike Bziava
