= Pastorale (film) =

- Directed by: Otar Iosseliani
- Written by: Revaz Inanishvili; Otar Iosseliani; Otar Mekhrishvili
- Produced by: Shota Laperadze
- Starring: Nana Ioseliani; Nestor Pipia; Kseniya Pipiya
- Cinematography: Abessalom Maisuradze
- Production company: Kartuli Pilmi
- Release date: 1975
- Running time: 95 minutes
- Country: Soviet Union
- Languages: Russian; Georgian

Pastorale (Georgian: Pastorali / პასტორალი), is a Soviet film shot in Georgia in 1975 and directed by Otar Iosseliani.

Like all Georgian productions of that period, Pastorale was filmed in the Georgian language and then dubbed in Russian for other Soviet republics.

== Synopsis ==
In Georgia, four musicians and their manager arrive at a village to prepare in secluded silence for their next pastoral music concert. The host's children prepare the upper floor of the house for their guests. In this way, with the musicians coming home and participating in the life in the village, sections from daily life are presented with a poetic expression. Musicians and villagers look at each other in amazement, thinking how different ways of life they are.

At the end of the film, an apple tree blooming in spring indicates that life in the village will continue unchanged.

== Filming technique ==
The most important feature is that the sounds of life are heard in detail throughout the entire film. Sometimes the music playing is a complementary element, and even the intervening dialogues do not break this integrity.

== Awards ==
- International Critics' Prize from the Berlin Film Festival (1982)

== Bibliography ==
- Ein Sommer auf dem Dorf, Lexikon des internationalen Films, Filmdienst, Access date: 19 May 2022 (in German)
- Pastorali, Dennis-Schwartz-Reviews, 09/01/2008
