= Jacques Deschamps =

French theologian and priest

Jacques Deschamps (March 6, 1697 in Pays de Caux – October 3, 1759, in Dangu) was a French theologian and priest.

His father, Noel Deschamps, was a village laborer remembered as being honest and hardworking, who died when his son Jacques was only four years old. In 1709, young Jacques was sent to Dieppe to continue the education he had begun in his father's home. From there, he went to Rouen, where he studied philosophy and then theology.

Deschamps was elevated to the priesthood in 1721, taking on a position at Caux that did not accord with his love of study. He was then able to go to Paris to complete the necessary studies to become a Doctor of the Sorbonne.

He then went to a seminary in Paris, where he was able to devote himself to his studies. In 1728, he was appointed parish priest of Dangu, in the diocese of Rouen. He served there for 31 years, until his death.

Deschamps composed a French translation of the Book of Isaiah, published in 1760, which is noted for being rather more free than literal—even to the point of reordering lines and paragraphs. This translation is introduced by three "discourses" of a theological nature.

Deschamps died before being able to publish a similar work on the Psalms, which he had been working on for some years.

He is remembered for his desire to educate the young.
