= Favorites of the Moon =

Les Favoris de la lune Favorites of the Moon
- Directed by: Otar Iosseliani
- Written by: Otar Iosseliani; Gérard Brach
- Produced by: Philippe Dussart
- Cinematography: Philippe Théaudière
- Edited by: Dominique Belfort
- Music by: Nicolas Zourabichvili
- Distributed by: Les Films Molière
- Release date: 1984
- Running time: 105 minutes
- Country: France
- Language: French

Les Favoris de la lune (internationally released as Favorites of the Moon) is a 1984 French drama film written and directed by Otar Iosseliani.

== Cast ==
- Katja Rupé as Claire
- Alix de Montaigu as Delphine Laplace
- François Michel as Philippe
- Jean-Pierre Beauviala as Colas
- Vincent Blanchet as terrorist
- Otar Iosseliani as terrorist
- Mathieu Amalric as Julien

== Release ==
The film was released in France in 1985.

== Reception ==
The film entered the competition at the 41st Venice International Film Festival, where it received the Special Jury Prize.
