= Otar Iosseliani =

Georgian film director (1934–2023)

Otar Ioseliani
- ოთარ იოსელიანი
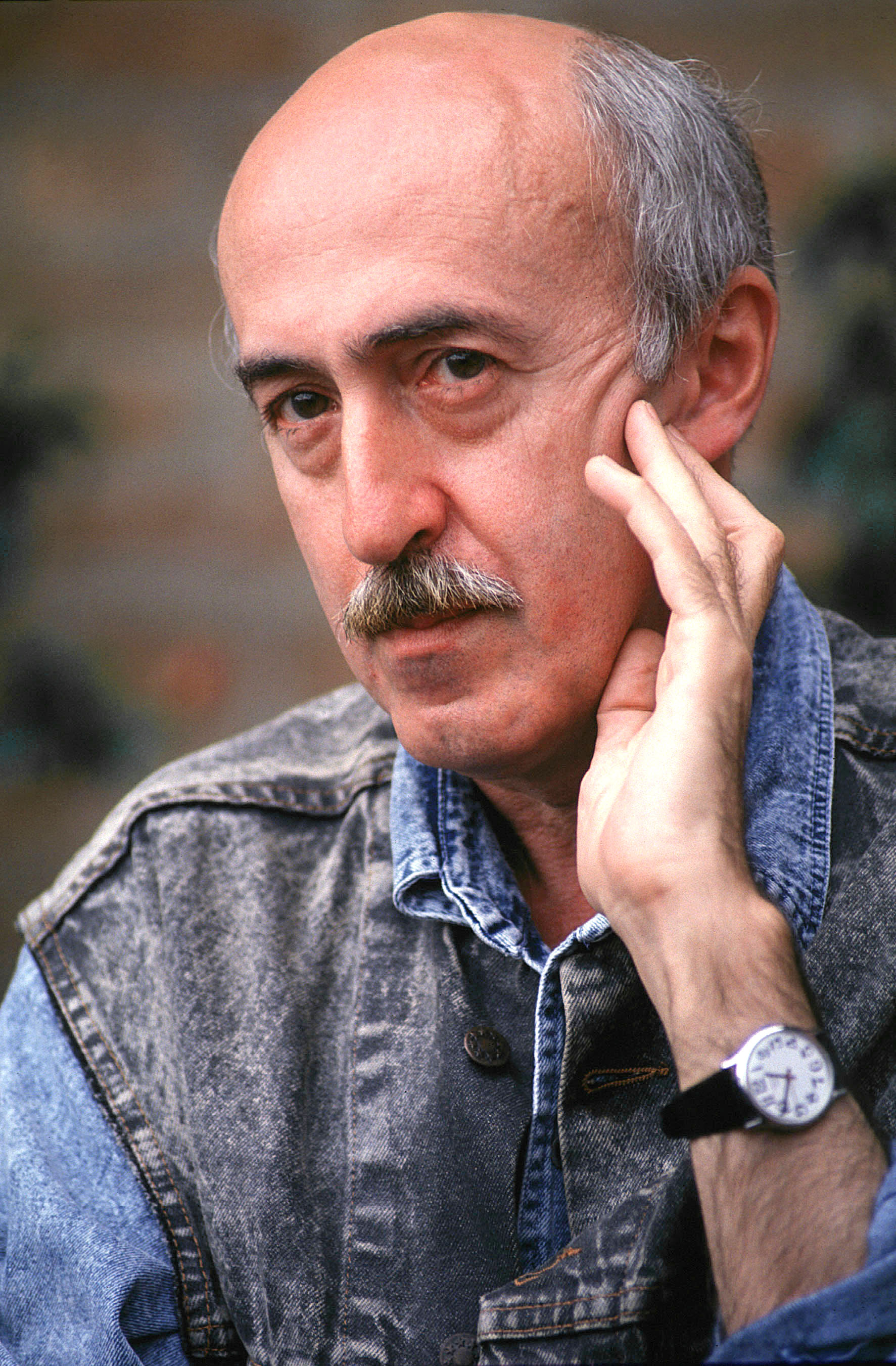
- Ioseliani in 1989
- Born: 2 February 1934; Tbilisi, Georgian SSR, Transcaucasian SFSR, Soviet Union
- Died: 17 December 2023 (aged 89); Tbilisi, Georgia
- Occupation: Film director
- Years active: 1958–2015
- Otar Iosseliani's voice Recorded 19 April 2011

Otar Iosseliani (Georgian: ოთარ იოსელიანი otar ioseliani; 2 February 1934 – 17 December 2023) was a Georgian film director, known for movies such as Falling Leaves, Pastorale and Favorites of the Moon. Iosseliani received a lifetime achievement honor – the CineMerit Award at the Munich International Film Festival in 2011 for his career accomplishments.

== Early life ==
He was born in the Georgian capital city of Tbilisi, where he studied at the Tbilisi State Conservatoire and graduated in 1952 with a diploma in composition, conducting and piano.

In 1953 he went to Moscow to study mathematics at the University of Moscow, but two years into his studies he transitioned to the Gerasimov Institute of Cinematography (VGIK) where his teachers included many early Soviet filmmakers such as Alexander Dovzhenko, Lev Kuleshov, Mikhail Romm, Grigori Kozintsev and Mikhail Chiaureli.

== Film career ==
While studying at the VGIK, Iosseliani also began work as an assistant director and editor at the Georgian Film Studio (Gruziafilm). Iosseliani directed his first short film, Akvarel, in 1958 while a student at the VGIK. He graduated from VGIK in 1961, with a diploma in film direction.

His next film Aprili (1961) was initially denied theatrical distribution, until being finally released in 1972. Iosseliani briefly abandoned filmmaking in 1963–1965 when he worked on a fishing boat and then at the Rustavi metallurgical factory. In 1966 he directed his first feature film Falling Leaves (Giorgobistve). Falling Leaves was presented at the Critics' Week at the 1968 Cannes Film Festival and won a FIPRESCI award there. His 1982 film Pastorale was initially delayed and then only given a limited release in the Soviet Union. Iosseliani grew sceptical about getting any artistic freedom in his homeland. Disillusioned with the creative suppression of filmmakers in his native country, and following Pastorali's success at the 1982 Berlin Film Festival, he eventually left the Soviet Union, settling in France in 1982. His subsequent movies were sometimes critical of the Georgian Soviet Socialist Republic and the Soviet Union.

Following Pastorale's success at the 1982 Berlin Film Festival, the director made Les Favoris de la Lune (Favourites of the Moon) in 1984. The film was distinguished with a Special Jury Prize at the Venice Film Festival.

After the initial success of Favorites of the Moon in 1984, the Venice Film Festival became a showcase for many of his subsequent films. In 1989 he again received a Special Jury Prize at the Venice Film Festival for And Then There Was Light (Et la Lumière Fut) and in 1992 the Pasinetti Award for Best Direction for Chasing Butterflies (La Chasse Aux Papillons). After the dissolution of the Soviet Union he continued to work in France where he made the documentary Georgia, Alone (Seule, Géorgie) (1994) which was followed by the sardonic and allegorical Brigands (Brigands – Chapitre VII) (1996).

In 1986 he was a member of the jury at the 36th Berlin International Film Festival and in 1995 he was a member of the jury at the 19th Moscow International Film Festival.

In 1999, he won the Louis Delluc Prize in France for his film Farewell, Home Sweet Home. He acted in the film, portraying the optimistic, alcoholic husband and father.

In 2011 his film Chantrapas was selected as the Georgian entry for the Best Foreign Language Film at the 84th Academy Awards, but it did not make the final shortlist.

In 2011 Otar Iosseliani received a lifetime achievement honor – the CineMerit Award at the Munich International Film Festival. It was given by his former pupil, the Georgian filmmaker Dito Tsintsadze.

In 2023, in a retrospective review of his long career, with his films spanning seven decades, Ronald Bergan of The Guardian stated: "His self-described 'abstract comedies' are understated and incisive explorations of human absurdity, always faithful to his idiosyncratic vision, and discarding any kind of cohesive narrative." Regarding his unconventional directorial style and character development, Bergan stated: "Iosseliani observed his characters through behaviour rather than dialogue. His use of sound and silence, and his complex movements of people, animals and objects made him the true heir to Jean Renoir, Jacques Tati and Luis Buñuel."

== Death ==
Iosseliani died on 17 December 2023, at the age of 89. His death was announced by his longtime friend, photographer Yuri Rost. After news of his death, Georgian prime minister Irakli Garibashvili described Iosseliani as an "honoured figure" of Georgian art.

== Filmography ==
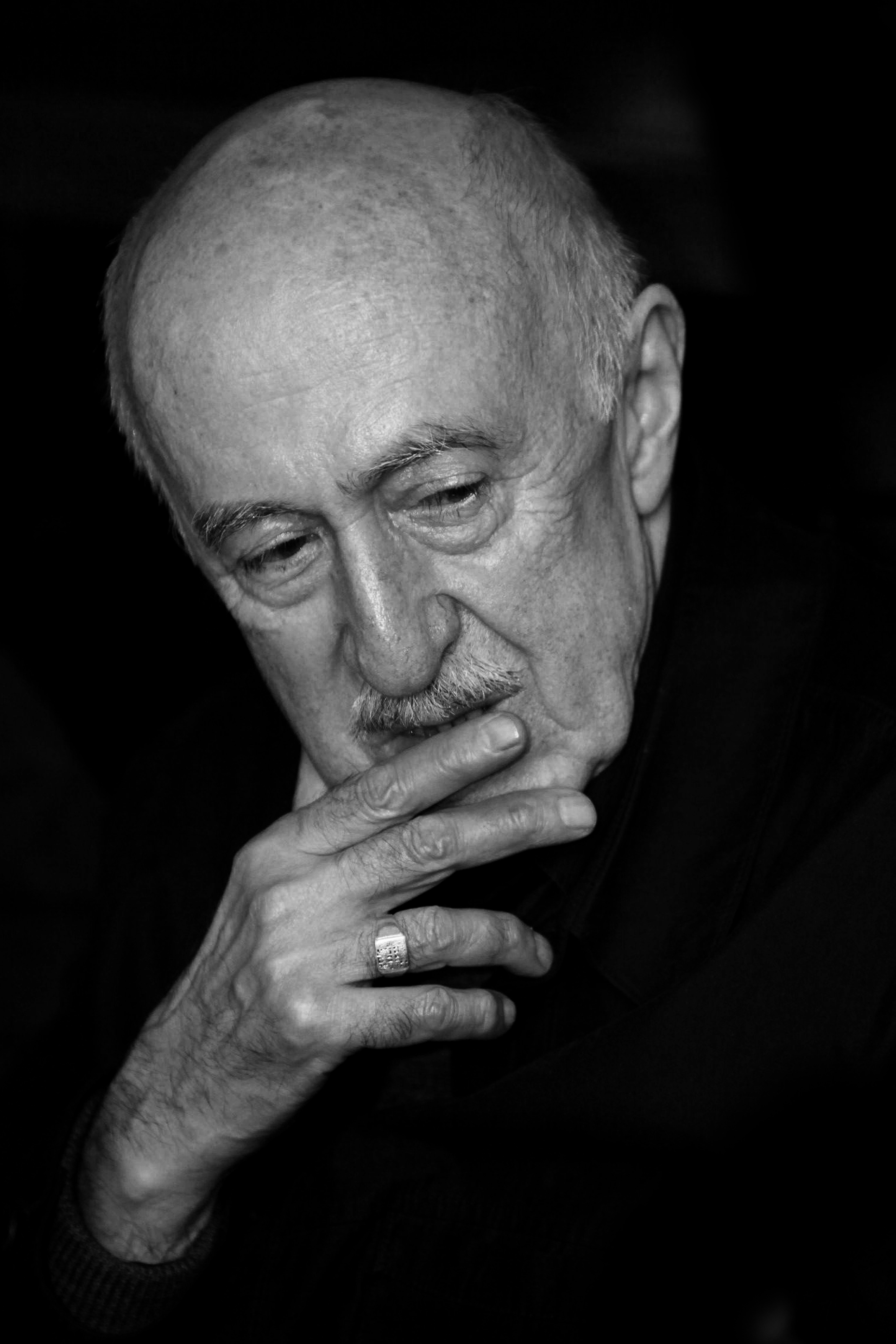
Otar Ioseliani in 2013, London

- Akvarel (1958) (TV)
- Sapovnela (1959)
- April (1961) / Ap'rili
- Tudzhi (1964)
- Falling Leaves (1966) / Giorgobistve
- Georgian Ancient Songs (1969) / Dzveli qartuli simgera
- Once Upon a Time There Was a Singing Blackbird (1970) Iqo shashvi mgalobeli
- Pastorale (1975) / Past'orali
- Lettre d'un cinéaste (1982) (TV)
- Sept pièces pour cinéma noir et blanc (1983)
- Euzkadi été 1982 (1983) (TV)
- Favorites of the Moon (1984) / Les Favoris de la lune
- Un petit monastère en Toscane (1988)
- And Then There Was Light (1989) / Et la lumière fut
- Chasing Butterflies, or Hunting Butterflies, or The Butterfly Hunt (1992) / La Chasse aux papillons
- Seule, Géorgie (1994)
- Brigands-Chapter VII (1996) / Brigands, chapitre VII
- Farewell, Home Sweet Home (1999) / Adieu, plancher des vaches!
- Monday Morning (2002) / Lundi matin
- Gardens in Autumn (2006) / Jardins en automne
- Chantrapas (2010)
- Winter Song (2015) / Chant d'hiver
