= Nadezhda Kozhushanaya =

Soviet and Russian writer, screenwriter

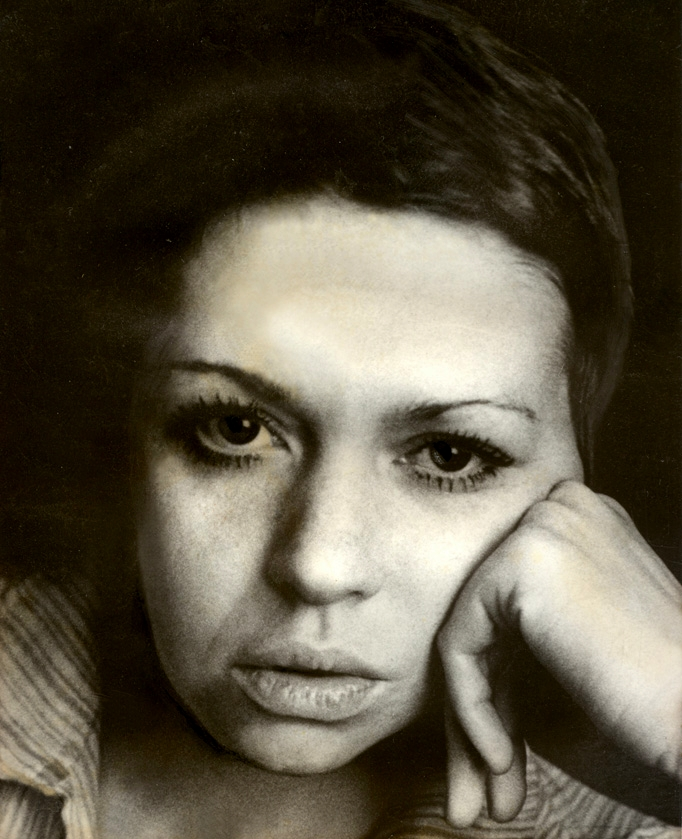
- Born: Nadezhda Pavlovna Yamshanova; 15 March 1952 Sverdlovsk, USSR
- Died: 15 January 1997 (aged 44) Moscow, Russia
- Occupation: Screenwriter, writer
- Citizenship: Russia
- Years active: 1983—1997

Nadezhda Pavlovna Kozhushanaya (Russian: Надежда Павловна Кожушаная; 15 March 1952 in Sverdlovsk – 15 January 1997 in Moscow) was a Soviet, Russian screenwriter and writer. Nadezhda said: "I live and write with love to my crazy time". She was a philologist and a musician by education, a playwright by vocation. Although she died at the age of 44, she was referred to as "The most gifted screenwriter of the perestroika epoch".

== Biography and creative work ==
=== Childhood ===
Nadezhda Kozhushanaya (Yamshanova) was born in Sverdlovsk (Yekaterinburg). Her father was Pavel Ivanovich Yamshanov (the Chief Engineer of a laboratory of the Uralmash plant), who had a rich library of art books and fiction. Her mother was Glafira Mihailovna Yamshanova (Smirnova) (a teacher at a local Metallurgical Technical College). Her parents divorced when Nadezhda was eight. From an early age Nadezhda wrote her own stories and fairy tales. Her story "Pustiak" was based on her first dramatic experience of reading aloud for the class.

=== University ===
After school in 1968 Nadezhda went to Ural State University to study philology. She actively took part as an actress and an accompanist in student theatres of the University and Ural State Academy of Architecture and Arts. She composed music and easily played in the piano, guitar and accordion that gave a nudge to the decision to study in the Urals Mussorgsky State Conservatoire, but her mother made a requirement that Nadezhda should graduate the University first. In preparation to her thesis, Nadezhda worked in the museum of Muranovo, where she also gave guided tours about Fyodor Tyutchev. After graduation, according to the common Soviet practice, she was posted as a teacher of Russian to a remote village of Kunara, Sverdlovsk Oblast. In 1975 Nadezhda married Boris Kozhushany and moved to Moscow, where her husband studied at the Moscow Architectural Institute.

=== Moscow ===
In Moscow, first she had a clerical job (later she wrote comic stories about it). Plays and other works of this period almost did not survive, but it was the time when she created her own style. Nadezhda said: "Everything that I wrote is needed to be read aloud." On 1 December 1980 her daughter Ekaterina was born.
In 1982–1984 Nadezda studied at the High Courses for Scriptwriters and Film Directors in Moscow as a Screenwriter. After her admission interview, Valentin Chernykh, one of the leaders of the courses, formulated his reluctance to take Nadezhda as: "She is a person with the character like Gennady Shpalikov, Vladimir Vysotsky, Oleg Dahl. Also she is a woman, so it will be even harder for her ". In the end she was accepted into the workshop of Semyon Lungin. In addition to Semyon Lungin, she studied under Valeri Frid, Merab Mamardashvili, Alexander Mitta, Paola Volkova. During this time she wrote three full-length scripts: "The Fence", "The Very First Happy Day" (graduation work) and "The Last Doll Game". The last script was set in 2010.

Nadezhda Kozhushanaya died in 1996 from pneumonia. After her death she got an honorary title. Overall, she wrote scripts for eight short films, five animation films, four full-length films and a number of scripts which did not turn into films.

=== Scenography ===
Full-length films:

- 1987 – Mirror for a Hero directed by Vladimir Khotinenko, (Nomination for the Nika Award)
- 1989 – Tamara Aleksandrovna's Husband and Daughter directed by Olga Narutskaya, (Nomination at the Venice Film Festival)
- 1991 – Leg directed by Nikita Tyagunov, (FIPRESSI award at Rotterdam International Film Festival)
- 1992 – Prorva directed by Ivan Dykhovichny, (Nomination at the Venice Film Festival)
- 2010 – The Last Doll Game directed by Georgiy Negashev

Short films and animation:

- 1983 – Walking Around the City, short feature directed by Aleksandr Zeldovich
- 1984 – Most, short feature.
- 1985 – We Can't Predict..., short feature directed by Olga Narutskaya.
- 1985 – Buzkashi, short feature, directed by Pulat Achmatov
- 1986 – Toro!, short feature directed by Talgat Temenov
- 1990 – A Thing of the Past, animation film directed by Oksana Cherkasova
- 1991 – Terrorist, short feature directed Mihail Rozenshteyn
- 1993 – Cuckoo's Nephew, animation film directed by Oksana Cherkasova Awards at KROK, Drezden, Parn, Oberhauzen and Hiroshima Animation film festivals.
- 1994 – Oh, My God!, directed Tatyana Skabard
- 1994 – Tenderness and Affection for You, Sick; documentary about the centre of Alcoholics Anonymous, VGTRK, directed by Tatyana Lebedeva
- 1995 – Nyurka's Bath, animation film directed by Oksana Cherkasova Awards at Zagreb, Leipzig and Espinho Animation film festivals, Nomination for the Nika Award.
- 1996 – Babushka (Grandma), animation film directed by Andrey Zolotukhin Awards at KROK and Fantoche.
- 1996 – The Pink Doll, directed by Valentin Olshvang, Awards at KROK, Leipzig, Zagreb and Hiroshima Animation film festivals.
- 1996 – Unliving Beast, short feature directed by Marina Lubakova

=== Actor works ===
- 1988 – Husband and daughter of Tamara Alexandrovna as a cleaner
- 1992 – Leg as a nurse

== Gallery ==
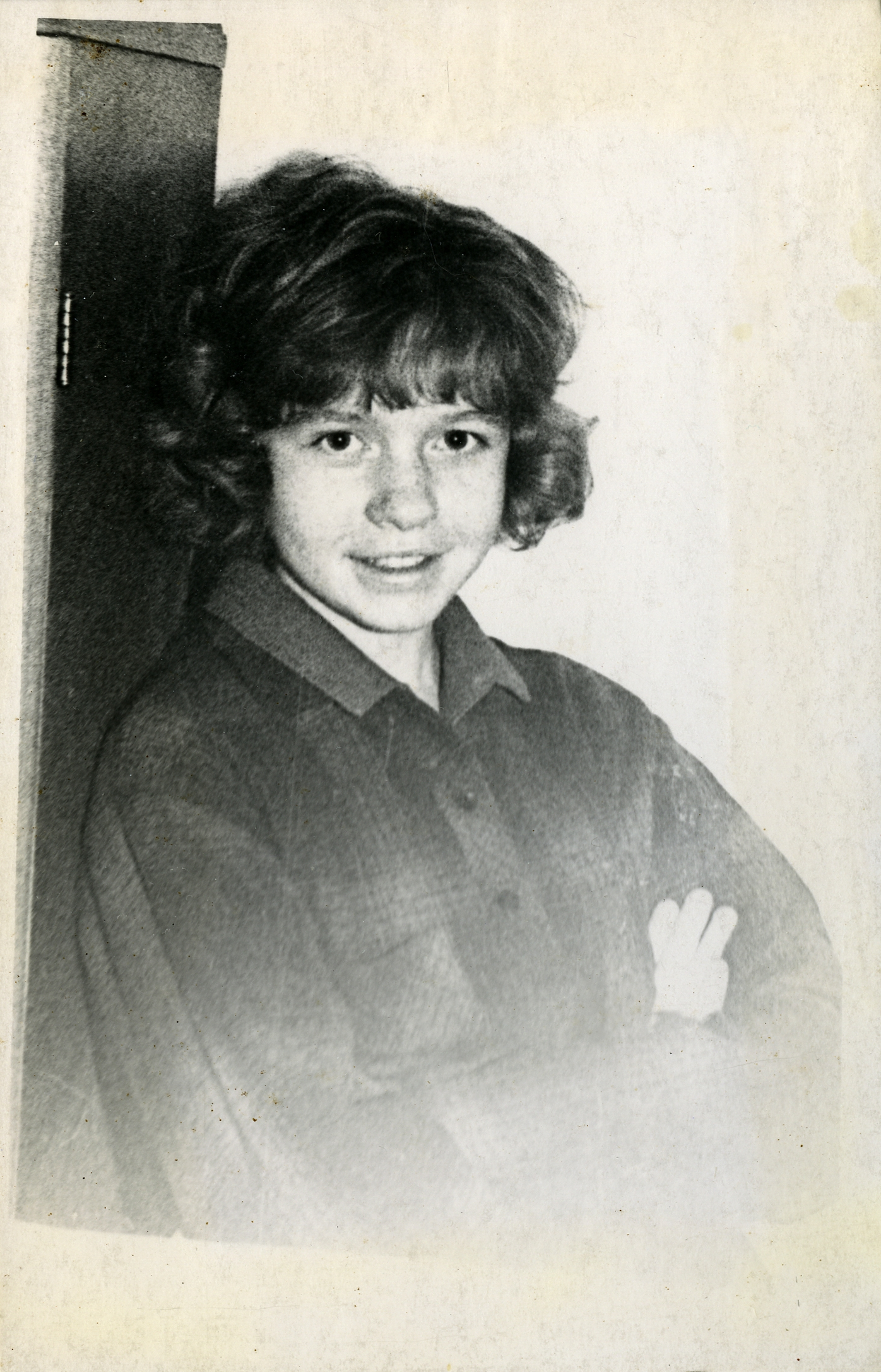
As Nadezhda Yahmanova,1968

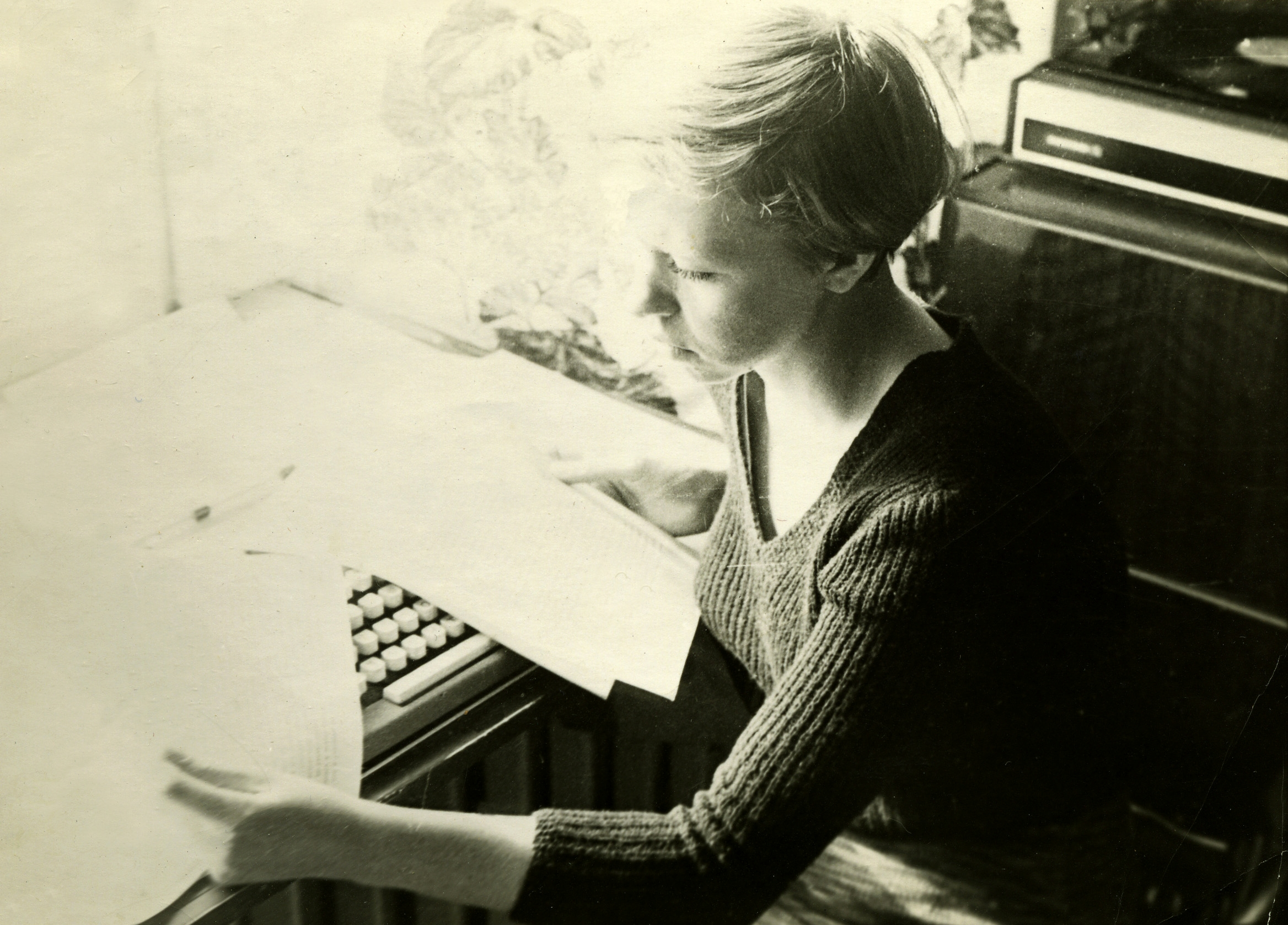
Moscow, at the courses

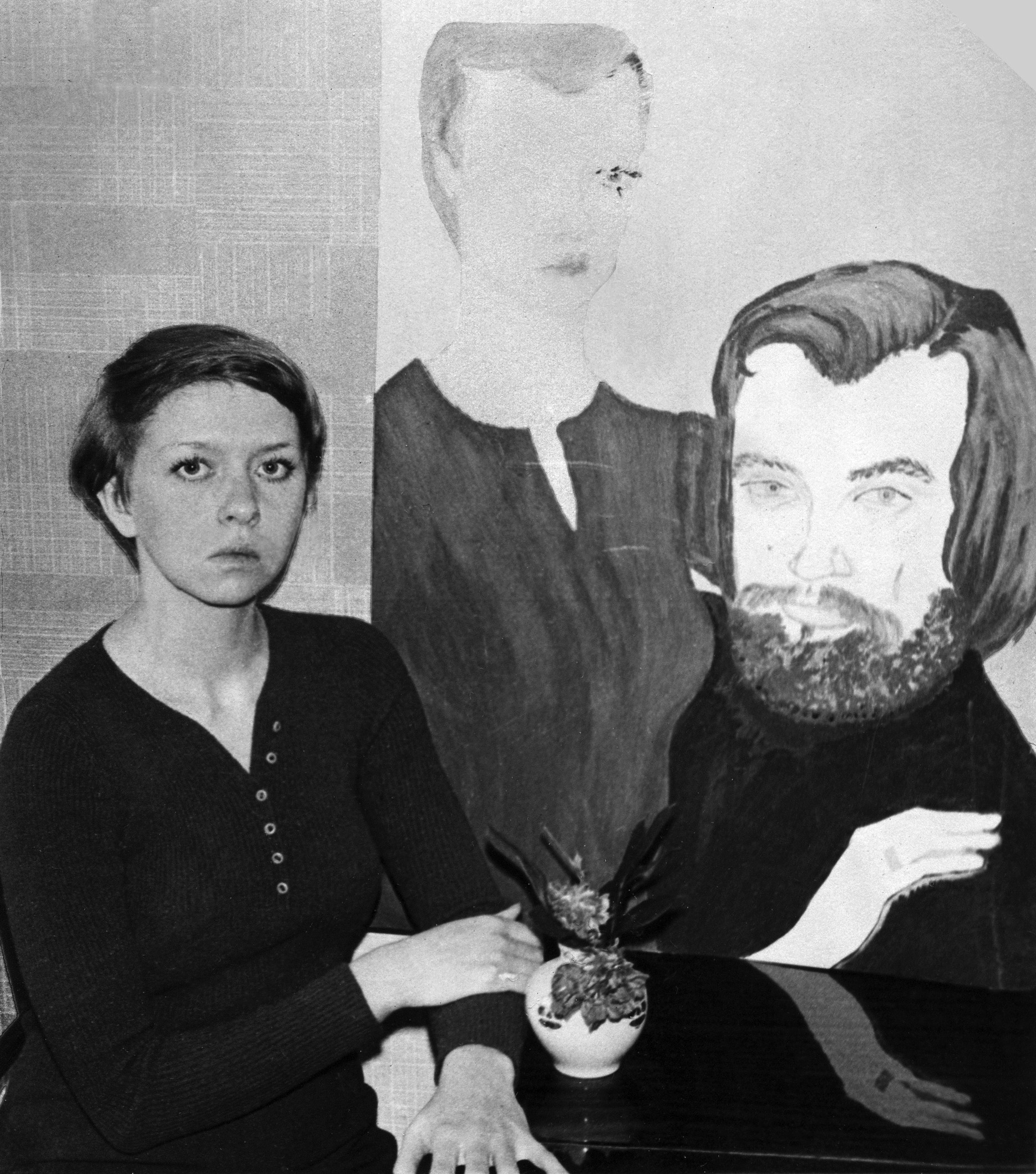
Her portrait of the family

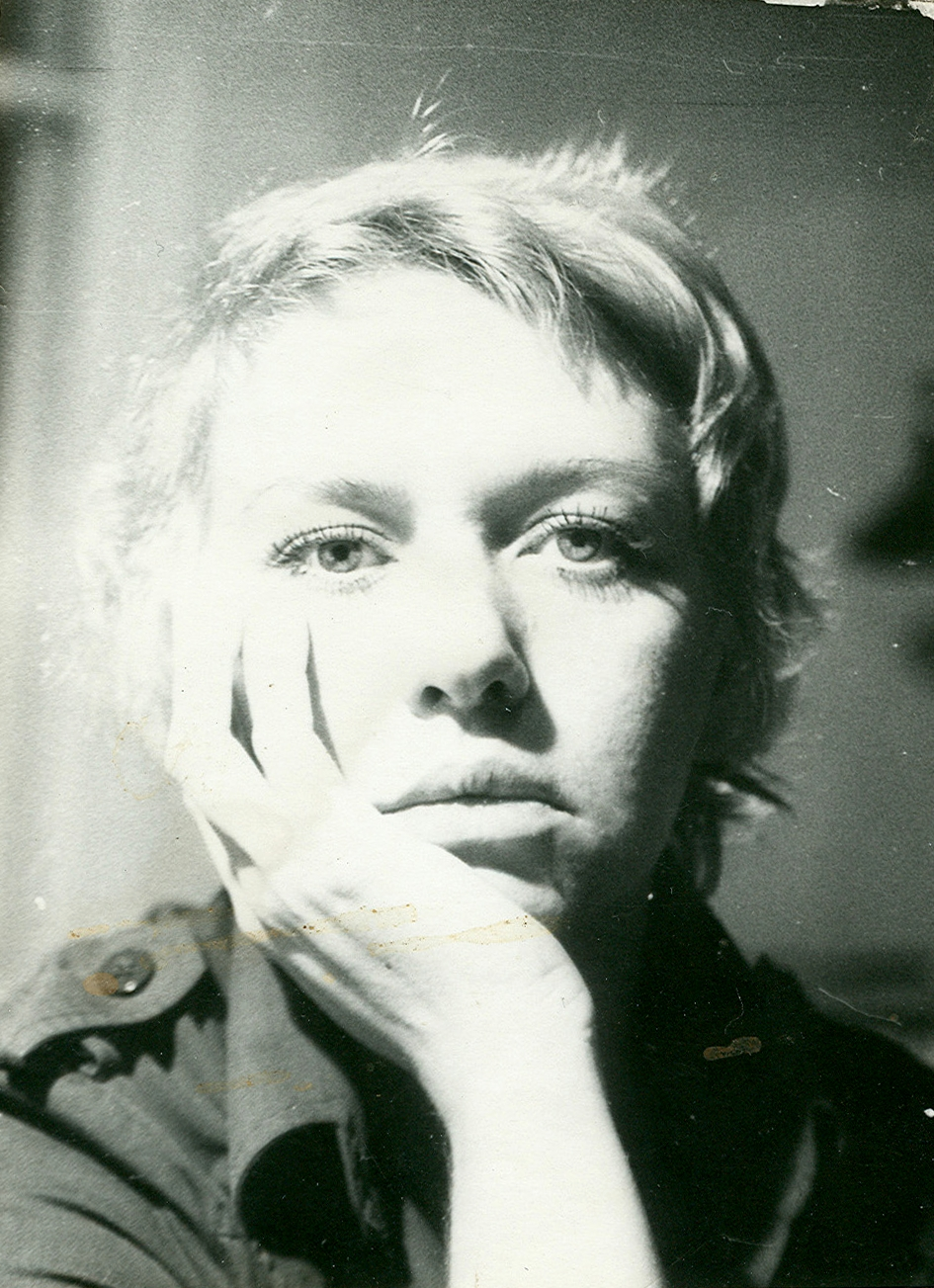
Moscow, the end of the 1980s

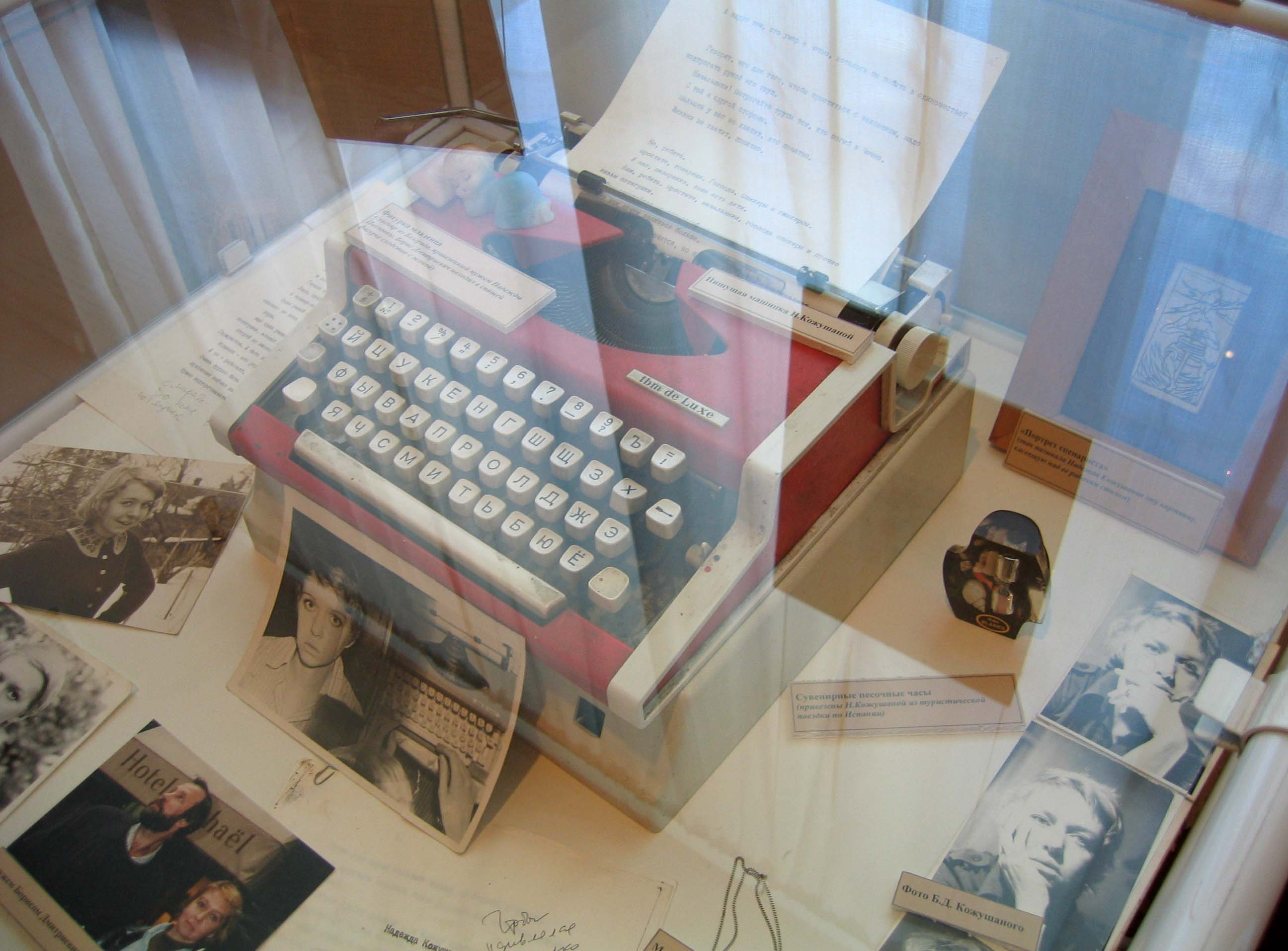
Her typewriter in the Moscow Film Museum
