= 46th Venice International Film Festival =

Italian film festival in 1989

- Festival poster
- Location: Venice, Italy
- Founded: 1932
- Awards: Golden Lion: A City of Sadness
- Festival date: 4 – 15 September 1989
- Website: Website

Venice Film Festival chronology
- 47th 45th

The 46th annual Venice International Film Festival was held from 4 to 15 September 1989.

Soviet actor and filmmaker Andrei Smirnov was the Jury President of the main competition.

The Golden Lion winner was A City of Sadness directed by Hou Hsiao-hsien.

== Jury ==
The following people comprised the 1989 jury:

- Andrei Smirnov, Soviet actor and filmmaker - Jury President
- Néstor Almendros, Spanish cinematographer
- Pupi Avati, Italian filmmaker and producer
- Klaus Maria Brandauer, Austrian actor and director
- Danièle Heymann, French film critic and journalist
- Eleni Karaindrou, Greek composer
- John Landis, American filmmaker
- Mariangela Melato, Italian actress
- David Robinson, English film critic and author
- Xie Jin, Chinese filmmaker

== Official Sections ==
The following films were selected to be screened:

=== In Competition ===
English title	Original title	Director(s)	Production country
And Then There Was Light	Et la lumière fut	Otar Iosseliani	France, Germany
Australia		Jean-Jacques Andrien	Belgium, France
Berlin-Jerusalem	ברלין ירושלים	Amos Gitai	Israel, United Kingdom, France, Netherlands, Italy
Blue Eyed	Blauäugig	Reinhard Hauff	West Germany
Christian		Gabriel Axel	Denmark
A City of Sadness	悲情城市	Hou Hsiao-hsien	Taiwan
Crystal or Ash, Fire or Wind, as Long as It's Love	In una notte di chiaro di luna	Lina Wertmüller	Italy
Death of a Tea Master	千利休 本覺坊遺文	Kei Kumai	Japan
I Want to Go Home		Alain Resnais	France
Island		Paul Cox	Australia
Layla, My Reason	Layla	Taïeb Louhichi	Algeria, France, Tunisia
Love Me Not?	M' agapas?	Giorgos Panousopoulos	Greece
New Year's Day		Henry Jaglom	United States
The Pitfall	Fallgropen	Vilgot Sjöman	Sweden
Recollections of the Yellow House	Recordações da Casa Amarela	João César Monteiro	Portugal
She's Been Away (Screen One episode 5)		Peter Hall	United Kingdom
Sitting on a Branch, Enjoying Myself	Sedím na konári a je mi dobre	Juraj Jakubisko	Czechoslovakia
Street Kids	Scugnizzi	Nanni Loy	Italy
Suddenly, One Day	Ek Din Achanak / एक दिन अचानक	Mrinal Sen	India
Tamara Aleksandrovna's Husband and Daughter	Муж и дочь Тамары Александровны	Olga Narutskaya	Soviet Union
Twisted Obsession	El sueño del mono loco	Fernando Trueba	Spain
What Time Is It?	Che ora è?	Ettore Scola	Italy
The Woman from Rose Hill	La femme de Rose Hill	Alain Tanner	Switzerland

=== Special Events ===
English title	Original title	Director(s)	Production country
Dekalog		Krzysztof Kieslowski	Poland
Il Poliedro di Leonardo		Filippo Mileto, Vittorio Giacci	Italy
I Was Stalin's Bodyguard	Я служил в охране Сталина	Semyon Aranovich	URSS
Rouge Venise		Etienne Périer	France
The Mahabharata		Peter Brook	United Kingdom

=== Orizzonti ===
English title	Original title	Director(s)	Production country
Emergency Kisses	Les baisers de secours	Philippe Garrel	France
Guests of Hotel Astoria		Mohamed Reza Allamehzadeh	Netherlands
Hanna Monster, Liebling		Christian Berger	Austria
O Recado das Ilhas		Ruy Duarte de Carvalho	Angola
Seven Women	Sieben Frauen	Rudolf Thome	West Germany
Warriors and Prisoners	Guerreros y cautivas	Edgardo Cozarinsky	Argentina

=== Venezia Notte ===
English title	Original title	Director(s)	Production country
The Cook, the Thief, His Wife & Her Lover		Peter Greenaway	United Kingdom
Dead Poets Society		Peter Weir	United States
Donator		Veljko Bulajić	Yugoslavia
Hard to Be a God	Es ist nicht leicht ein Gott zu sein	Peter Fleischmann	West Germany, Soviet Union, France, Switzerland
Indiana Jones and the Last Crusade		Steven Spielberg	United States
Johnny Handsome		Walter Hill	United States
Scenes from the Class Struggle in Beverly Hills		Paul Bartel	United States
The Spirit	Der Atem	Niklaus Schilling	West Germany, Switzerland, Austria
The Story of Boys & Girls	Storia di ragazzi e di ragazze	Pupi Avati	Italy
Time to Kill	Tempo di uccidere	Giuliano Montaldo	Italy
Uncontrollable Circumstances	Force majeure	Pierre Jolivet	France

=== Venezia Risguardi ===
English title	Original title	Director(s)	Year
Risguardi - Evgenij Francevic Bauer
The Girl from the Street	Дитя большого города	Yevgeni Bauer	1914
Risguardi - Michal Waszynski
The Dybbuk	דער דיבוק	Michał Waszyński	1937
Tribute to Carl Theodor Dreyer on the centenary of his birth
Ordet		Carl Theodor Dreyer	1955
Tribute to Charles Spencer Chaplin
How to Make Movies		Charlie Chaplin	1918
Kid Auto Races at Venice		Charlie Chaplin	1914
Tribute to Jean Cocteau
8 × 8: A Chess Sonata in 8 Movements	8 × 8	Jean Cocteau	1957
The Beautiful Indifferent	Le bel indifférent	Jacques Demy	1957
Beauty and the Beast	La Belle et la Bête	Jean Cocteau	1946
The Black Crown	La corona negra	Luis Saslavsky	1951
The Blood of a Poet	Le Sang d'un poète	Jean Cocteau	1932
Les Dames du Bois de Boulogne		Robert Bresson	1945
Desert Wedding	Les noces de sable	André Zwoboda	1948
The Eagle with Two Heads	L'Aigle à deux têtes	Jean Cocteau	1948
Eine Melodie - vier Maler		Herbert Seggelke	1955
Les Enfants terribles		Jean-Pierre Melville, Jean Cocteau	1950
The Eternal Return	L'éternel retour	Jean Delannoy	1943
The Human Voice	La voce umana	Roberto Rossellini	1948
Jean Cocteau: Autoportrait d'un inconnu		Edgardo Cozarinsky	1985
Grévin Museum	Musée Grévin	Jacques Demy	1959
Orpheus	Orphee	Jean Cocteau	1950
Les Parents terribles		Jean Cocteau	1948
The Phantom Baron	Le baron fantôme	Serge de Poligny	1943
La Princesse de Clèves		Jean Delannoy	1961
Romantici a Venezia		Luciano Emmer, Enrico Gras	1948
Testament of Orpheus	Le testament d'Orphée ou ne me demandez pas pourquoi	Jean Cocteau	1959
La Villa Santo-Sospir		Jean Cocteau	1952
La Voix Humaine		Michael Lonsdale	1983

== Independent Sections ==
=== Venice International Film Critics' Week ===
The following feature films were selected to be screened as In Competition for this section:

English title	Original title	Director(s)	Production country
Blood	O Sangue	Pedro Costa	Portugal
Chameleon Street		Wendell B. Harris Jr.	United States
The Handsome Priest	Il prete bello	Carlo Mazzacurati	Italy, France
Homebound	Kotia päin	Ilkka Järvi-Laturi	Finland
Jaded		Oja Kodar	United States
Koma	Кома	Nijole Adomenajte	Soviet Union
Lover Boy		Geoffrey Wright	Australia
Love Without Pity	Un monde sans pitié	Éric Rochant	France
Spring Race	Corsa di primavera	Giacomo Campiotti	Italy
Programma Speciale
Red Wood Pigeon	Palombella Rossa	Nanni Moretti	Italy

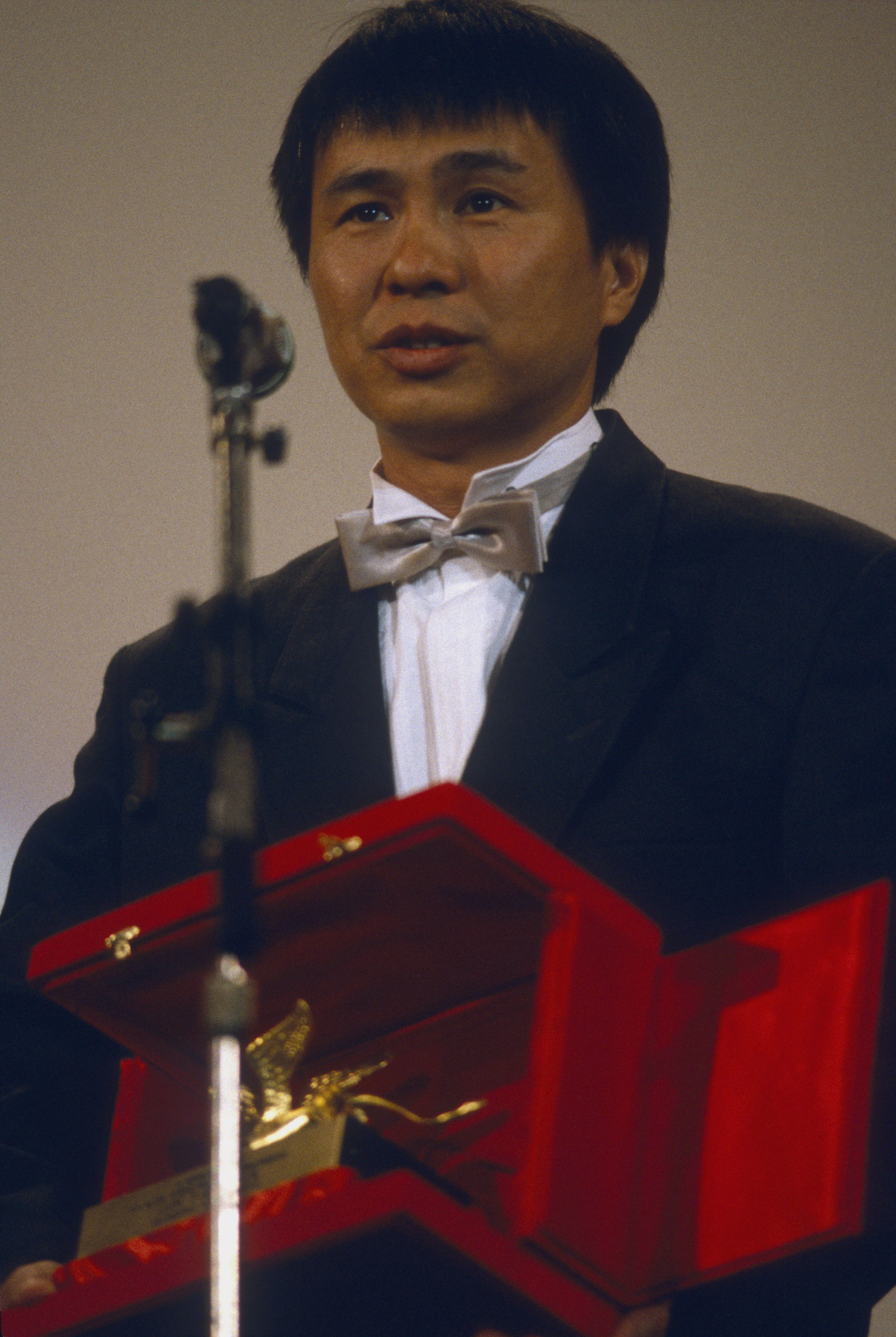
Hou Hsiao-hsien, winner of the Golden Lion

== Official Awards ==
=== Main Competition ===
- Golden Lion: A City of Sadness by Hou Hsiao-hsien
- Grand Special Jury Prize: And Then There Was Light by Otar Iosseliani
- Silver Lion:
  - Recollections of the Yellow House by João César Monteiro
  - Death of a Tea Master by Kei Kumai
- Golden Osella:
  - Best Screenplay: Jules Feiffer for I Want to Go Home
  - Best Cinematography: Giorgos Arvanitis for Australia
  - Best Music: Claudio Mattone for Street Kids
- Volpi Cup for Best Actor: Massimo Troisi & Marcello Mastroianni for What Time Is It?

Volpi Cup for Best Actress: Peggy Ashcroft & Geraldine James for She's Been Away

=== Career Golden Lion ===
- Robert Bresson

== Independent Awards ==
=== The President of the Italian Senate's Gold Medal ===
- Street Kids by Nanni Loy

=== Golden Ciak ===
- Best Film: I Want to Go Home by Alain Resnais
- Best Actor: Massimo Troisi for What Time Is It?
- Best Actress: Peggy Ashcroft for She's Been Away

=== FIPRESCI Prize ===
- Critics Week: Love Without Pity by Eric Rochant
- Out of Competition: Dekalog by Krzysztof Kieślowski

=== OCIC Award ===
- What Time Is It? by Ettore Scola
  - Honorable Mention: Ek Din Achanak by Mrinal Sen

=== UNICEF Award ===
- Reinhard Hauff for Blue Eyed

=== UNESCO Award ===
- Hou Hsiao-hsien for A City of Sadness

=== Pasinetti Award ===
- Best Film: I Want to Go Home by Alain Resnais
- Best Actor: Massimo Troisi for What Time Is It?
- Best Actress: Peggy Ashcroft for She's Been Away

=== Pietro Bianchi Award ===
- Francesco Rosi

=== Little Golden Lion ===
- Street Kids by Nanni Loy
- She's Been Away by Peter Hall

=== Elvira Notari Prize ===
- Olga Narutskaya for Tamara Aleksandrovna's Husband and Daughter

=== Filmcritica "Bastone Bianco" Award ===
- Nanni Moretti for Red Wood Pigeon
  - Special Mention:
    - Otar Iosseliani for And Then There Was Light
    - Amos Gitai for Berlin-Jerusalem
    - João César Monteiro for Recollections of the Yellow House

=== Sergio Trasatti Award ===
- Peter Hall for She's Been Away

=== Children and Cinema Award ===
- Krzysztof Kieślowski for Dekalog

=== Kodak-Cinecritica Award ===
- Eric Rochant for Love Without Pity
