= Panousopoulos =

Panousopoulos is a surname. Notable people with the surname include:

- Giorgos Panousopoulos (1942–2026), Greek cinematographer, film director, and screenwriter
- Vasileios Panousopoulos (1874–?), Greek major general
