= Oksana Cherkasova =

Russian animator

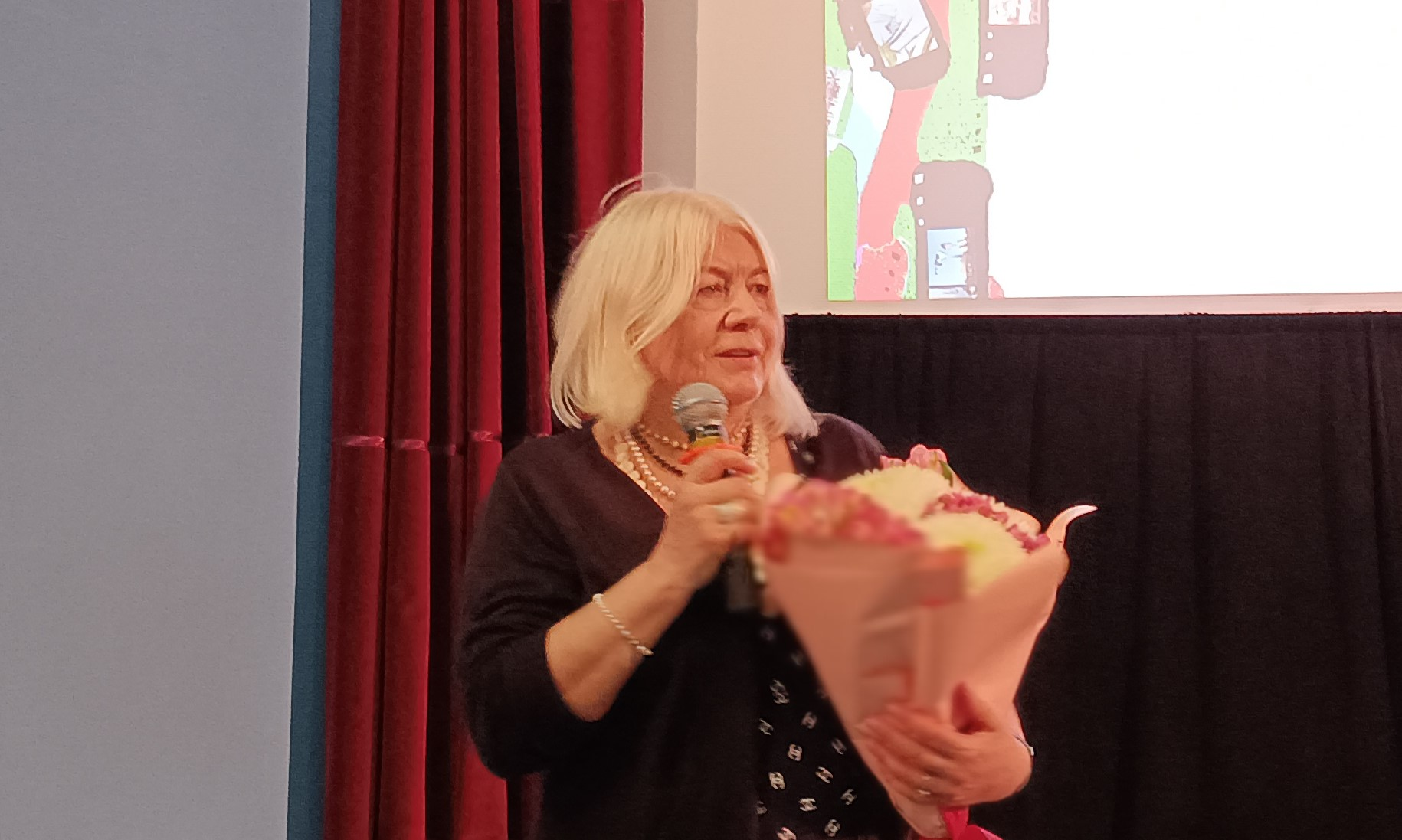
- Cherkasova in 2022
- Born: Oksana Makarova; 20 August 1951 (age 75); Norilsk, Russian SFSR, USSR
- Citizenship: USSR, Russia
- Education: High Courses for Scriptwriters and Film Directors (1981); Sverdlovsk Architectural University (1976)
- Occupations: Animator, director
- Years active: 1977–present
- Children: 2

Oksana Cherkasova (Russian: Черкасова Оксана Леонтьевна) - Soviet and Russian director of animation films and animator. She received the State Prize of Russian Federation in 1996. She is a Member of the Union of Cinematographers of the Russian Federation, and Member of the Russian Academy of Cinema Arts and Science Nika Award.

== Biography ==
Oksana Cherkasova was born on August 20, 1951, in the city of Norilsk. In 1976 she graduated from the department of Design of the Sverdlovsk Architectural University. Then she worked at the Institute of Technical Aesthetics, and then at the Sverdlovsk Film Studio, as an artist and assistant director. With the film group, she visited many parts of the former USSR. In the years 1979–1981, she studied at the High Courses for Scriptwriters and Film Directors in Moscow (in the workshop of Fyodor Khitruk and Yuri Norstein).

From 1981 to 2002 worked at the Sverdlovsk Film Studio, and Studio A-FILM as a director and animator. She's been making films in collaboration with artists Valentin Olshvang, Andrey Zolotukhin, Boris Vishev and others. Since 1991 she has contributed to directing a folklore theatre in Yekaterinburg.

Since 2002, she has been teaching at the Ural State University of Architecture and Art, since 2004 she has been Chair of "Graphics and Computer Animation".

== Filmography ==
=== Director ===
- 1985 "Kutkh and the Mouse" (Kutkh i myshi)
- 1987 "The Wingless Gosling" (Beskrylyi gusyonok)
- 1989 "Let Bygones Be Bygones" (Delo proshloe)
- 1992 "The Cuckoo's Nephew" (Plemyannik kukuski)
- 1995 "Nurka's Bath" (Nyurkina banja)
- 1999 "Yours Pushkin" (Vash Pushkin)
- 2002 "The Man from the Moon" (Chelovek s luny)
- 2007 “Antonio Vivaldi” in the series “Tales of the Old Piano” (Skazki starogo pianino)
- 2011 "Gioachino Rossini. Notes of a Gourmet" in the series "Tales of the Old Piano" (Skazki starogo pianino)
- 2014 "Kupava"

=== Commercial ===
- 1995 Vodka 'Absolute'

== Awards ==
- "The Wingless Gosling"
  - Diploma of the KROK Festival, 1987
  - First prize of the Pärnu International Documentary and Anthropology Film Festival
  - Prize "Silver Polkan" of Film Festival in Samara
- "Let Bygones Be Bygones"
  - Jury Prize of the KROK
  - First prize of the Pärnu International Documentary and Anthropology Film Festival
  - Prize "Golden Polkan" of Film Festival in Samara
- "The Cuckoo's Nephew"
  - Grand Prix of the Pärnu International Documentary and Anthropology Film Festival (Estonia)
  - Grand Prix of the Feminale Cologne International festival (Germany)
  - First prize of KROK (Ukraine)
  - First prize of the Filmfest Dresden (Germany)
  - First prize of the International Short Film Festival Oberhausen (Germany)
  - Second prize of Hiroshima International Animation Festival (Japan)
- "Nurka's Bath"
  - First prize of Animafest Zagreb (Yugoslavia)
  - First prize of the Filmfest Dresden (Germany)
  - First prize of the Hiroshima International Animation Festival (Japan)
  - First prize of Fantoche (Switzerland)
  - First prize of KROK (Ukraine)
  - Second prize "Silver Dove" of the International Film Festival DOK Leipzig (Germany)
  - Grand Prix of the International Film Festival CINANIMA in Espinho (Portugal)
  - Grand Prix Female cinema in Minsk (Belarus)
  - Special prize of the jury of the Open Russian Festival of Animated Film in Tarusa (Russia)
- "Yours Pushkin"
  - Great Gold Medal of Artistic Unions of Russia
  - Special Jury Prize of the Filmfest Dresden (Germany)
  - Special Jury Prize of the Open Russian Festival of Animated Film in Tarusa (Russia)
- "The Man from the Moon"
  - Special Jury Prize of the Open Russian Festival of Animated Film in Suzdal (Russia)
  - Grand Prix "Golden Dove" of the International Film Festival DOK Leipzig (Germany)
- "Kupava"
  - Jury Prize Window to Europe Film Festival, Vyborg, Russia, 2015

== Links ==
- Oksana Cherkasova at IMDb
- Mir Studio, Biography
- Shar Studio, Nurka's Bath
- Shar Studio, Yours Pushkin
- Shar Studio, The Man from the Moon
