= Sotiris Kakisis =

Greek poet

Sotiris Kakisis (Greek: Σωτήρης Κακίσης; born 1954, Athens) is a contemporary Greek poet. He is a prolific translator, most notably of Ancient Greek lyric poetry (Sappho, Alcaeus, Hipponax, Mimnermus etc.). Kakisis has also translated into modern Greek famous works by Lewis Carroll, Carlo Collodi, Lyman Frank Baum, James Thurber, Edward Gorey, Marcel Proust, and the "Complete Prose of" Woody Allen. He has had a long career in journalism, excelling as an interviewer, has written song lyrics, and has scripted several films, notably director Giorgos Panousopoulos' Love Me Not? and Athens Blues. His adaptations of Euripides' Medea and Herondas' Mimiamboi have been stage-produced by the State Theater of Norway and the Greek National Theater, respectively. The Greek National Theater presented the summer of 2020 at the Epidaurus ancient theater festival his translation of Aristophanes' Lysistrata and the summer of 2021 his translation of Aristophanes' The Knights.

== Scripts ==
- M' agapas? / Love Me Not? (1989) at IMDb
- Mia mera ti nyhta / Athens Blues (2001) at IMDb
- Gina Dostoyevsky (2007) at IMDb
