= Georgy Shishkin =

Russian artist

- Born: 25 January 1948; Sverdlovsk, Russian SFSR, Soviet Union
- Education: Ural State Academy of Architecture and Arts in Ekaterinburg
- Known for: Painting
- Notable work: “Russian Dreams” cycle of paintings (from 1992)
- Awards: the Taylor Foundation Prize (1999)

Georgy Shishkin (Russian: Георгий Георгиевич Шишкин; French: Gueorgui Chichkine; born January 25, 1948) is a Russian painter.

== Biography ==
Born in Ekaterinburg (then Sverdlovsk), Russian SFSR, son of a first violinist of the orchestra of the musical theatre, from the age of six, Shishkin began violin classes. As a child he showed an early passion for drawing, and by his tenth year he was enrolled a fine art school. During his youth, he was deeply influenced by the atmosphere at his great-grandparents’ house, steeped with authentic Russian traditions conserved during the Soviet regime.

Young Shishkin travelled to the many old cities in his country. With his easel, he visited monasteries and paid close attention to the icons and frescoes. In the Vladimir Cathedral, an ex-capital of Russia, he was struck by the works of Andrei Rublev, considered the first Russian painter.

He was a graduate of the Ural State Academy of Architecture and Arts in his home town, in 1975, then a trainee at the Stroganov Moscow State University of Arts and Industry. Georgy Shishkin was a professor of drawing and painting for about 10 years at this academy where he started as a trainee.

From 1974 he took part in professional art exhibitions, while remaining at home in Socialist Realism. In the same year, he won the national competition for young creators in Russia and participated in the Prestige Exposition in Moscow.

Experimentation with different techniques led him to favour pastel from 1980 and three years later he created his base preparation under the pastel.

In 1981, during his first personal exhibition, many of his paintings were acquired by the State Fine Arts Museum.

However, being multi-faceted, Georgy Shishkin made the interior decorations for the Ekaterinburg Opera Museum (1982–1985), with two large frescoes and a portrait gallery of the most famous soloists. The portrait of the ballet star Piotr Gusev was acquired by the Saint Petersburg State Museum of Theatre and Music.

At the same time, for nine years, the artist worked as an architect and several buildings were erected according to his plans.

In 1992, after travelling abroad, in Germany and the Netherlands, (from 1989), Georgy Shishkin, in a quest for his roots, began painting his “Russian Dreams” cycle of paintings. This cycle intended to express spiritual content by uniting abstraction and reality.

He was invited by the mayor of Saint Petersburq, Anatoly Sobchak, to show his works in the Russian State Museum.

As for the painting devoted to Chaliapin, it was presented to the Bolshoi Theatre in Moscow.

His arrival in France (1993) and in Monaco (1995) led to a meeting with “White Russians” and a new impulse for his cycle.

Lord Alistair McAlpine, after his visit to the Shishkin exhibition in Paris, wrote an article about him titled "Painter who captured the enigma of Russia" in The European Magazine (21–27 September 1995), noting the great mastery of the painter and high quality of his works.

In 1999, Shishkin won the Taylor Foundation Prize.

At Christie's, during an auction in the Principality, one of his paintings reached fourth place among works of famous artists like Arman, Botero, Folon or Matta (Le Figaro, 20 March 1999).

Living in Monaco since 1998, the artist has participated in many humanitarian and charitable activities.

Georgy Shishkin’s works are found in museums and private collections in many countries, notably in the Prince Palace in Monaco, in the collection of Queen Elizabeth II of the United Kingdom, in the collections of Luciano Pavarotti, Lord Alistair McAlpine, brothers Lords David and Frederick Barklay. The artist has made two series of paintings for the Royal Palace of H.M. Sheik Zayed bin Sultan Al Nahyan of Abu Dhabi.

Invited to design Monaco’s postage stamps in 2005, Shishkin won the competition for drawing the effigy in profile of H.R.H. Prince Albert II of Monaco.

In month May, 2009 in Monaco two postage stamps « Centenary of Ballets Russians of Diaghilev » went out, created by Georgy Shishkin. He received a congratulation from Mr Geoffrey Marsh, Director of Department of Theatre of the Victoria and Albert Museum, London.

== Exhibitions ==
=== Personal exhibitions ===
- 1981 - Artists' Center, Ekaterinburg;
- 1982 - Art Museum, Irbit;
- 1983 - Central Exhibition Room, Tiumen;
- 1984 - Ural State Conservatoire, Ekaterinburg;
- 1987 - Central Arts Center, Moscow; - Central Literature Center, Moscow; - Physicists' town, Dubna; - Astronauts' town "Zvezdny"; - Central Architects' Center, Moscow;
- 1989 - Exhibition room of the Ministry of the Construction of Oil and Gas Products, Moscow;
- 1991 - Burg Vossloch Gallery, Hamburg, Germany; - Hall of the Soviet Supreme, Moscow;
- 1993 - Bolshoi Theater, Moscow; - Exhibition at the XIXe World Philosophy Congress, Moscow; - Exhibition at the IIe World Congress of Compatriots, Russian Academy of Science, Moscow;
- 1994 - "ADS" Gallery, Paris;
- 1995 - Trianon Palace, Versailles;
- 1997 - Grande Maison, Physicists' town, Bures-sur Yvettes, France;
- 1999 - Palais des Festivals, Cannes; - Atrium of Casino, Monte-Carlo, Monaco;
- 2000 - Exhibition "Russian Dreams", Gallery des Ponchettes, Nice; - Château-Museum, Auvers-sur-Oise;
- 2005 - Art 3 Gallery, Paris; - Grand Theater, Luxembourg; - Museum-Citadelle, Villefranche-sur-Mer;
- 2006 - Grimaldi Forum Monaco;
- 2008 - Exhibition, Center Universitaire Méditerranéen, Promenade des Anglais, Nice;
- 2009 - Exhibition "Centenary of Ballets Russians of Diaghilev", Espace Pierre Cardin, Paris; - Exhibition "A tribute to Nijinsky and the Ballets Russes", Monaco, Monegasque National IAA Committee with UNESCO – Visual Arts, 10, Quai Antoine I, 27 September (Heritage Days) - 26 October 2009;
- 2010 - Exhibition "Russian Dreams" of Georgy Shishkin in Paris, in the Year of Russia in France under the patronage of the French Academy;
- 2015 - Exhibition "Russian Dreams" of Georgy Shishkin in Monaco, in the Year of Russia in Monaco, Palais des Congres;
- 2017 - Exhibition "Russian Dreams" of Georgy Shishkin in the State Russian Museum in Saint Petersburg;

=== Exhibitions de groupe ===
- 1974 - Traditional Spring Exhibition, Artists' Center, Ekaterinburg; - Exhibition of the Works of the Students of the Russian Federation, Novosibirsk; - National Exhibition of Young Artists, VDNKh, Moscow;
- 1980 - Regional Art Exhibition, State Gallery, Ekaterinburg;
- 1982 - National Exhibition, Central Exhibition Room "Carousel", Moscow; - "La Nouvelle Collection", Museum of Art, Ekaterinburg;
- 1987 - Exhibition Russian-American at the International Congress "Cooperation in Space in the name of Peace on Earth", International Trade Center Hammer, Moscow;
- 1989 - Autumn Art Exhibition, Gallery 28, Malaya Grouzinskaia, Moscow; - Art Exhibition International "Kunst und Kosmos", "Kö-Gallery", Düsseldorf;
- 1991 - "Russian Portrait", Artists' Center, Kouznietsky Bridge, Moscow; - "Art russe" (avec Kandinsky), "Burg Vossloch" Gallery, Hamburg; - Exhibition of the International Federation of UNESCO Artists, Central Exhibition Room "Carousel", Moscow;
- 1995 - "Les Artistes du Monde", Espace Montparnasse, Paris;
- 1998 - "XXIIe Prix International d’Art Contemporain de Monte-Carlo"; Monaco;
- 1999 - Christie’s (Monaco), Exhibition of 12 Artists: Arman, Botero, Chichkine, Folon, Matta...; - "Créateurs d’Aujourd’hui", organisé par "Arts Inter" (invité comme président d’honneur), Palais des Congres, Saint-Quay-Portrieux; - "Les Maîtres du Portrait contemporain", Museum of Art, Menton;
- 2000 - Gallery of Fondation Taylor, Paris;
- 2001 - "Ambassadeurs of Art European", Lincoln Center, New York;
- 2002 - EUROPASTEL (invité d’honneur), Cuneo, Italy;
- 2003 - Maison de Radio-France, Paris;
- 2004 - Château-Museum Grimaldi, Cagnes-sur-Mer;
- 2005 - Ie Exhibition Internationale of Pastel in Moscow, Central Arts Center;
- 2006 - Art en Capital, Grand Palais, Paris;
- 2007 - Ier Salon International of Pastel, Paris;

== Works ==
- interior decorations for the Ekaterinburg Opera Museum (1982–1985), with two large frescoes and a portrait gallery of the most famous soloists;
- Cycle of pictures " Russians Dreams ";
- Series of artists' portraits;
- Pictures, dedicated to the Theatre: " Tribute to Chaliapin ", 1993; triptych " Tribute to Ballets Russians of Diaghilev ", 1997; " Tribute to Nijinsky ", 2000–2001; " Serge Lifar in Ikare ", 2005;
- Stamps of Monaco;
- Stamps of Russia;

== Stamps ==
=== Stamps of Monaco ===
Invited to design Monaco’s postage stamps in 2005, Shishkin (CHICHKINE) won the competition for drawing the effigy in profile of H.R.H. Prince Albert II of Monaco.

- "Salle Garnier" (Opéra de Monte-Carlo), block of six stamps, November 16, 2005.
- "150th birthday of creation of l`Orchestre Philharmonic of Monte Carlo, 1856-2006", April 6, 2006.
- "40th birthday of the Foundation Prince Pierre of Monaco", June 20, 2006.
- Effigy in profile of H.S.H. Prince Albert II of Monaco, December 1, 2006.
- "Europa: the scouting", diptych, May 4, 2007
- "Johannes Brahms, 175 years old of the birth of the compositor", January 3, 2008.
- "50th birthday of the Nobel prize of Literature to Boris Pasternak", April 8, 2008.
- "48th Festival of Television of Monte Carlo", June 2, 2008.
- "200th anniversary of the birth of Felix Mendelssohn", January 29, 2009.
- "Centenary of Ballets Russians of Diaghilev", May 11, 2009
- "150th anniversary of Anton Pavlovich Chekhov’s birth", December 4, 2010.
- "Football in South Africa", Mars 4, 2010.
- Block of H.S.H. Prince Albert II of Monaco' marriage to Miss Charlene Wittstock, July 1, 2011.
- "50th anniversary of the first man to travel into outer space", September 28, 2011.
- "Bicentenary of the birth of Theophile Gautier", October 10, 2011.
- "150th anniversary of the birth of Claude Debussy", August 22, 2012.
- "Centenary of the creation of the ballet "The Rite of Spring" by Stravinsky, May 22, 2013.
- "Christmas 2013", October 30, 2013.
- "2015 Russian Year in Monaco", January 7, 2015.
- "175th anniversary of the birth of Tchaikovsky", September 10, 2015.
- "150th anniversary of the birth of Arturo Toscanini", June 20, 2017.
- "200th anniversary of the birth of Jacques Offenbach", July 20, 2019.
- "250th anniversary of the birth of Ludwig van Beethoven", June 11, 2020.

=== Stamps of Russia ===
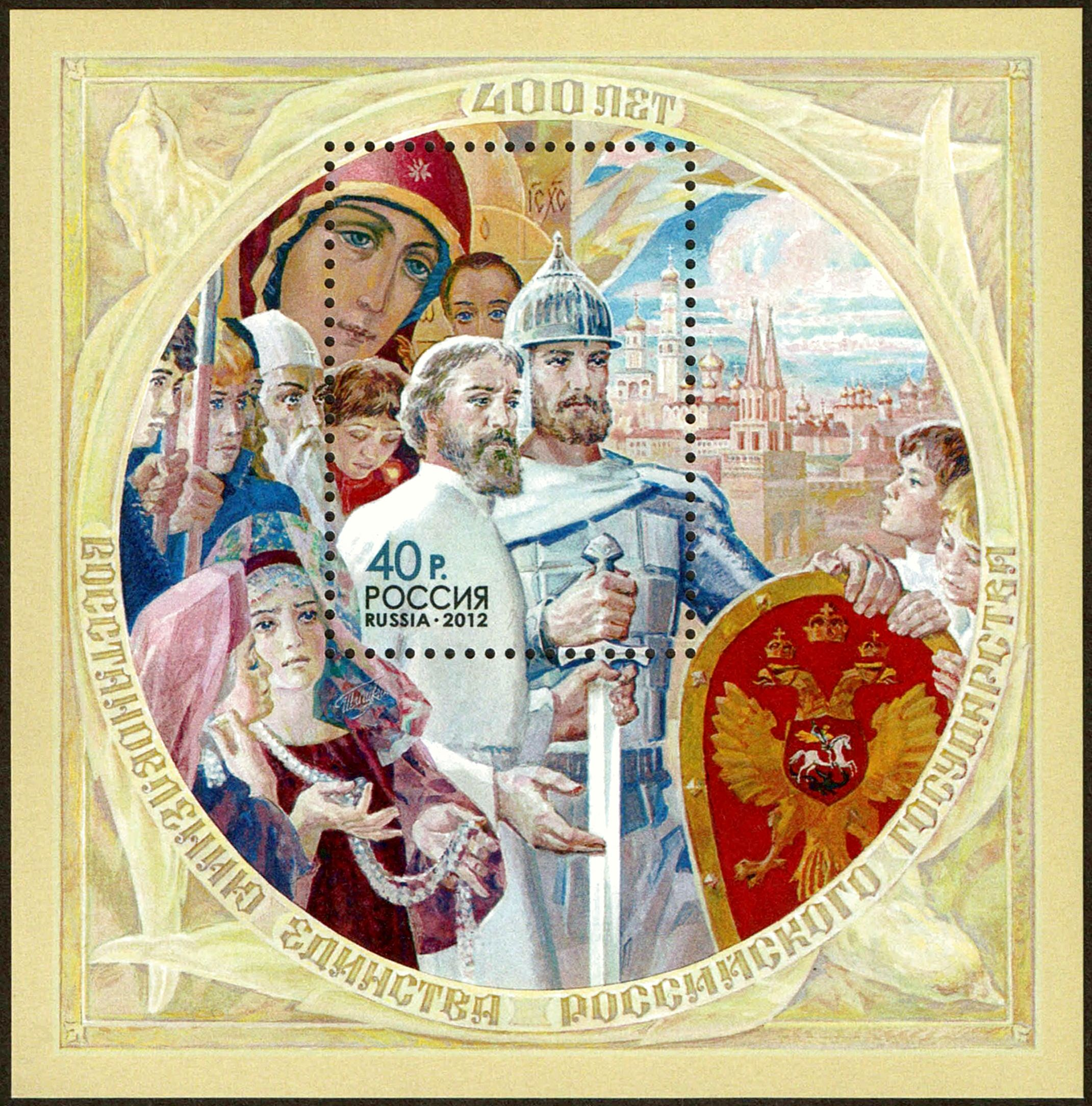
400th anniversary of the restoration of the unity of the Russian state. The souvenir sheet by Georgy Shishkin. Russian Post, 2012.

- "400th anniversary of the restoration of the unity of the Russian state", November 2, 2012. (winner of competition "The best stamp of Russia 2012")
- "The 1150th anniversary of the mission Saints equal to the Apostles Cyril and Methodius to the Slavic countries", May 24, 2013. (winner of competition "The best stamp of Russia 2013")
- "200th anniversary of the birth of Russian writer Ivan Turgenev", August 10, 2018.
- "200th anniversary of the birth of Russian poet Afanasy Fet", July 16, 2020.

== Publications ==
- "Gueorgui CHICHKINE/Georgy Shishkin" (fr./en.), peinture, graphique; Paris, 1995, avec une preface d'André Damien, membre de l'Institut de France, maire de Versalles, texte de Pierre-Marc Levergeois, écrivain, critique d'art.

- Alistair McAlpine "Painter who captured the enigma of Russia", London, "The European Magazine", 21–27 September 1995;

- Catalogue de l'exposition "XXIIème Prix International d’Art Contemporain de Monte-Carlo", 1998;

- Catalogue de l'exposition chez Christie’s de 12 peintres, Monaco, 1999;

- "WHO'S WHO IN INTERNATIONAL ART: les grands et nouveaux noms du Monde Artistique d'Aujo urd'hui" - International biographical art dictionary, 2000, p.: 36, 81, 94;

- Blandine Seigle "Les rêves pastel de Gueorgui Chichkine" (exposition au château-musée d'Auvers-sur-Oise), Le Parisien, November 2, 2000;

- Delarge J. Le Delarge — Paris: Gründ, Jean-Pierre Delarge, 2001. — ISBN 978-2-7000-3055-6

- "Gueorgui Chichkine au Grimaldi Forum", "Nice-Matin", Fevrier 19, 2006;

- Sophie Bastide "Gueorgui Chichkine"« Dis l'artiste, dessine-moi le timbre de tes rêves... », "L'Écho de la timbrologie", n° 1799, September 2006, p. 12-13;

- "1000 Russians painters", Ed. Bely Gorod, Moscow, 2006, p. 882;

- "Russian Art Guide";

- Catalog "Christie's Interiors", London, September 28, 2008;

- Victor Ignatov «The Season Russian to Cardin», «La Pensée Russe / РУССКАЯ МЫСЛЬ», Paris - London, № 17 (4744), May 1–7, 2009, p. 22;

- Victor Ignatov "Monte-Carlo and the Russian Ballets", «La Pensée Russe / РУССКАЯ МЫСЛЬ», Paris - London, № 21 (4748), 29 May - Juin 4, 2009, p. 24;

- T. Stojanov "Les "Ballets Russes" de Chichkine présentés au quai Antoine Ier", Nice-Matin (Monaco-Matin), October 19, 2009;

- The Year of Russia in France. Exhibition "Russian Dreams" of Georgy Shishkin in Paris, 2010;

- Catalog of Exhibition "Russian Dreams" of Georgy Shishkin in the State Russian Museum in Saint Petersburg, Palace Editions, 2017;
