= Tamara Aleksandrovna's Husband and Daughter =

1989 film

- Directed by: Olga Narutskaya
- Written by: Nadezhda Kozhushanaya
- Starring: Valentina Malyavina; Aleksandr Galibin
- Cinematography: Valeri Martynov
- Edited by: Tatyana Egorycheva
- Music by: Oleg Karavaychuk
- Release date: 1989
- Language: Russian

Tamara Aleksandrovna's Husband and Daughter (Russian: Муж и дочь Тамары Александровны, romanized: Muzh i doch' Tamary Aleksandrovny), is a 1989 Soviet drama film directed by Olga Narutskaya, in her feature film debut. It was entered into the main competition at the 46th edition of the Venice Film Festival.

== Cast ==
- Valentina Malyavina as Tamara Aleksandrovna
- Aleksandr Galibin as Valeriy Dyadichev
- Anna Bazhenova as Katya Dyadicheva
- Antonina Dmitrieva as Aunt Sasha
- Aleksandr Demyanenko as dyadya Slava
- Tatyana Rudina as physical education teacher
- Evgeniy Kalintsev as Fyodor Ukhov
- Galina Sokolova as Fyodor's mother
- Svetlana Yankovskaya as the gypsy
- Aleksandr Domogarov as Fyodor's classmate
- Nadezhda Kozhushanaya as the cleaner at the hospital

== Release ==
The film was screened in the main competition section at the 46th edition of the Venice Film Festival.

== Reception ==
A contemporary Variety review described the film as "a noisy film (both in its confused, dark images and cacophonic soundtrack) whose scenes and actors often spin out of control, drowned out in an attempted stylishness pic never achieves". La Stampa's film critic Stefano Reggiani described the film as "harrowing and cruel", praising the director’s "bitter and disillusioned perspective". In a retrospective analysis, Marina Drozdova noted "the picture is made in a style untraditional for the Soviet screen: the aesthetics of ugliness. The hopeless shabbiness of everyday life is the leading character of the film".
