= Love Me Not? =

1989 film

- Directed by: Giorgos Panousopoulos
- Written by: Giorgos Panousopoulos; Vassilis Alexakis; Sotiris Kakisis
- Starring: Andreas Barkoulis
- Cinematography: Giorgos Panousopoulos
- Edited by: Yorgos Mavropsaridis
- Music by: Heimerinoi Kolymvites
- Release date: 1989
- Language: Greek

Love Me Not? (Greek: Μ' αγαπάς;, romanized: M' agapas?) is a 1989 Greek romantic comedy film co-written and directed by Giorgos Panousopoulos. It was entered into the main competition at the 46th Venice International Film Festival.

== Cast ==
- Andreas Barkoulis as Giorgos Papazoglou
- Betty Livanou as Despoina Papazoglou
- Antonis Theodorakopoulos as Miltos Perakīs
- Myrto Paraschi as Kyria Perakīs
- Vana Barba as Mary
- Sofia Alimperti as Polyxenī
- Giorgos Konstas as Mr. Kindinis
- Thodoris Atheridis as Antonis
- Noni Ioannidou as Sleeping girl

== Release ==
The film was screened in the main competition at the 46th edition of the Venice Film Festival.

== Reception ==
The film won the Greek Ministry of Culture Prize. A contemporary Variety review described it as a film that 'cements helmer George Panoussopoulos' reputation as an ace cameraman and inventive visual stylist' and that 'could hook an audience on eye appeal alone, but rapid changes of cast and settings deprive it of adequate character development'. La Stampa's film critic Stefano Reggiani criticized the film, pointing that 'the only credit that must be given' to it is 'the considerable collection of female buttocks and breasts'.
