= Mania (1985 film) =

1985 film

- Directed by: Giorgos Panousopoulos
- Written by: Giorgos Panousopoulos
- Produced by: Yorgos Tsemperopoulos
- Starring: Alessandra Vanzi
- Cinematography: Giorgos Panousopoulos
- Edited by: Giorgos Panousopoulos
- Release date: October 6, 1985
- Running time: 92 minutes
- Country: Greece
- Language: Greek

Mania (Greek: Μανία) is a 1985 Greek adventure film directed by Giorgos Panousopoulos. It was entered into the 36th Berlin International Film Festival.

== Cast ==
- Alessandra Vanzi as Zoi Syropoulou
- Aris Retsos
- Antonis Theodorakopoulos
- Andreas Andreopoulos
- Arto Apartian
- Yannis Goumas
- Yiorgos Kalantzis
- Ilias Kapetanidis
- Eirini Koumarianou
- Betty Livanou
- Myrto Makri
- Mei Sevastopoulou
- Nikos Skiadas
- Fanis Veloudas
- Stavros Xenidis
