= And Then There Was Light =

- Directed by: Otar Iosseliani
- Written by: Otar Iosseliani
- Produced by: Alain Quefféléan; François-Xavier Decraene
- Cinematography: Robert Alazraki
- Edited by: Marie-Agnès Blum; Otar Iosseliani; Ursula West
- Music by: Nicolas Zourabichvili
- Release date: 1989
- Running time: 105 minutes
- Country: France

Et la lumière fut (internationally released as And Then There Was Light) is a 1989 French drama film written and directed by Otar Iosseliani.

The film entered the competition at the 46th Venice International Film Festival, where it received the Special Jury Prize.

== Cast ==
- Sigalon Sagna as Badinia
- Saly Badji as Okonoro
- Binta Cissé as Mzezve
- Marie-Christine Dieme as Lazra
- Fatou Seydi as Kotoko
