= Leg (film) =

1991 Soviet action film directed by Nikita Tyagunov

- Russian: Нога
- Directed by: Nikita Tyagunov
- Written by: William Faulkner; Nadezhda Kozhushanaya
- Starring: Ivan Okhlobystin; Pyotr Mamonov; Ivan Zakhava; Natalya Petrova; Farkhad Makhmudov
- Cinematography: Sergei Lyubchenko
- Edited by: V. Ostrinskoy
- Music by: Oleg Karavaychuk
- Release date: 1991
- Country: Soviet Union
- Language: Russian

Leg (Russian: Нога) is a 1991 Soviet action war drama film directed by Nikita Tyagunov. The film tells about a young man from Moscow who, at the age of 19, participates in military operations in Afghanistan, where he loses his leg. Returning home, he begins to realize that his problems have just begun.

== Plot ==
In 1980s USSR, Moscow students Valera "Martyn" Martynov and his friend "Red" are drafted into the army, stationed in Tajikistan where they perform monotonous duties yet maintain their humor. While on an assignment, they break a shovel and borrow one from a local, meeting his sister Kamilla, with whom Martyn forms a connection, even gifting her a makeshift watermill. However, Martyn and Red soon find themselves at war in Afghanistan. During a patrol, they discover a grim box marked "Gift for Soviet Soldiers," used by Afghan forces to send dismembered remains of Soviet captives. To Martyn’s horror, he finds Red’s body inside. In a fit of rage, Martyn commandeers an armored vehicle to avenge his friend by attacking a village but is critically injured and loses a leg.

Martyn struggles with phantom pain and hallucinations of Red, who haunts him with chilling requests. Meanwhile, rumors of Martyn’s ghostly presence reach Kamilla's home, though her brother begins to seek vengeance for her mysterious death. After receiving a prosthetic leg, Martyn starts a new life in Rybnisk, but his mental scars remain deep. Eventually, he learns Kamilla’s brother is hunting him, believing him responsible for her death. Strange sightings near her house suggest Martyn’s ghostly leg may indeed have taken on a life of its own and killed Kamilla. Confronted by his doppelganger—his "Leg"—Martyn returns to Tajikistan, only to face his haunting reflection laughing at him from a cliff. In despair, Martyn ends his life, his final words conveying both bitterness and resignation.

== Cast ==
- Ivan Okhlobystin as Martyn (as Ivan Chuzhoy)
- Pyotr Mamonov as Martyn's brother
- Ivan Zakhava
- Natalya Petrova as Kamilla
- Farkhad Makhmudov as Kamilla's Brother
- Lyudmila Larionova as Aunt Lyuda
- Sherali Abdulkajsov as Inspector
- Oksana Mysina as Anzhelika
- M. Ajnetdinova
- D. Andrianov
