= Blue Eyed (1989 film) =

1989 film

- Directed by: Reinhard Hauff
- Written by: Dorothee Schön; Reinhard Hauff
- Produced by: Eberhard Junkersdorf
- Starring: Götz George; Miguel Ángel Solá
- Cinematography: Hector Morini; Jaroslav Kučera
- Edited by: Heidi Handorf
- Music by: Marcel Wengler
- Release date: 1989
- Language: German

Blue Eyed (German: Blauäugig, Spanish: Ojos azules) is a 1989 political drama film co-written and directed by Reinhard Hauff. A co-production between West Germany and Argentina, it was entered into the main competition at the 46th Venice International Film Festival.

== Cast ==
- Götz George as Johann Neudorf
- Miguel Ángel Solá as Daniel
- Julio De Grazia as General von Elz
- Álex Benn as Alfredo
- Emilia Mazer as Laura

== Release ==
The film was screened in the main competition at the 46th edition of the Venice Film Festival, in which it won the UNICEF Award.

== Reception ==
A contemporary Variety review described the film as 'a suspenseful, but rather contrived, political thriller along Missing lines' that 'works best as a suspense thriller'. Filmdienst wrote: 'The political drama cleverly anchors the equation of South American military dictatorship and National Socialism on the level of individual experience, but suffers from dramaturgical weaknesses and simplifications'. La Stampa's film critic Lietta Tornabuoni described the film as 'average, sincerely democratic, [...] effective because of the special juxtaposition it establishes between two dictatorships, the Nazi one and the more recent Argentine military dictatorship', and noted: 'Hauff's style lacks sophistication or originality, but [his film] is redeemed by the intensity and dramatic weight of the events, [and by] the skillful construction of the plot'.
