= Street Kids (film) =

- Directed by: Nanni Loy
- Written by: Nanni Loy; Elvio Porta
- Produced by: Giovanni Di Clemente
- Starring: Leo Gullotta; Pino Ammendola
- Cinematography: Claudio Cirillo
- Edited by: Franco Fraticelli
- Music by: Claudio Mattone
- Distributed by: Titanus Distribuzione
- Release date: 12 October 1989 (Italy)
- Running time: 122 minutes
- Country: Italy
- Language: Italian

Street Kids (Italian: Scugnizzi) is a 1989 Italian musical drama film co-written and directed by Nanni Loy.

== Plot ==
Fortunato Assante (Leo Gullotta) is an out work/out of money actor. He agrees to take a job teaching drama at a reform school. After some hesitation he realizes the potential and ability of various students, and has pity for the lives these kids have lived on the streets.

== Cast ==
- Leo Gullotta as Fortunato Assante
- Pino Ammendola as Salvatore
- Francesco Allocca as Kid
- Sara Basile as Iodice
- Pino Caruso as the judge
- Tosca D'Aquino as Teresa
- Aldo Giuffrè as Don Nicola
- Bardia King as Brono
- Marco Leonardi as Salvatore
- Lina Polito as Mrs. Lanzetta

== Awards ==
Award	Category	Nominee	Result
David di Donatello Awards	Best Music	Claudio Mattone	Won
David di Donatello Awards	Best Song	Claudio Mattone	Won
David di Donatello Awards	Best Costume Design	Danda Ortona	Nominated
David di Donatello Awards	Best Director	Nanni Loy	Nominated
David di Donatello Awards	Best Producer	Giovanni di Clemente	Nominated
David di Donatello Awards	Best Screenplay	Nanni Loy; Elvio Porta	Nominated
Italian Golden Globes	Best Original Score	Claudio Mattone	Won
Italian National Syndicate of Film Journalists	Best Score	Claudio Mattone	Won
46th Venice International Film Festival	Golden Osella/Best Score		Won
46th Venice International Film Festival	Little Golden Lion	Nanni Loy	Won
46th Venice International Film Festival	The President of the Italian Senate's Gold Medal	Nanni Loy	Won
