= Vasileios Panousopoulos =

Vasileios Panousopoulos (Greek: Βασίλειος Πανουσόπουλος) was a Greek soldier who rose to the rank of major general.

== Life ==
Vasileios Panousopoulos was born in the village of Syllimni in Arcadia on 1 January 1874. He enlisted in the Hellenic Army on 2 October 1896, and after studies in the NCO officer school, was commissioned as a cavalry second lieutenant in 1904. He then went to Macedonia, where he fought in the Macedonian Struggle, during which he was wounded.

He participated in the Balkan Wars of 1912–13 under the Cavalry Brigade, and the cavalry detachment of the 3rd Infantry Division. In 1916, he participated in the National Defence coup d'etat, and subsequently fought in the Macedonian front until the end of World War I. In 1919–20 he led the 1st Cavalry Regiment in operations during the Asia Minor Campaign, especially during the Greek Summer Offensive in 1920. Following the November 1920 elections and the victory of the royalist coalition, he was dismissed from active service, and restored only after the 11 September 1922 Revolution, which appointed him commandant of Thessaloniki.

In 1924, he was placed in command of the Hellenic Army's sole Cavalry Division. He was forced to retire on 26 July 1927 due to his wartime wounds.
