= Nikita Tyagunov =

Nikita Gennadievich Tyagunov (Russian: Ники́та Генна́дьевич Тягуно́в; 7 February 1953 in Moscow – 20 July 1992 in Moscow) was a Soviet Russian film and theatrical director, whose film Noga (1991) won numerous awards, including FIPRESCI Award. He also directed and made TV films before 1990.

== Filmography ==
- 1983 — June, Moscow, Chertanovo
- 1984 — Isaac Babel's Odessa Stories
- 1985 — Someone Мust…
- 1986 — Your Daughter Alexandra
- 1986 — Children of Discord
- 1986 — Goldfish
- 1987 — And again, Krizhevsky
- 1989 — Jubilee Tango
- 1991 — Leg
