= She's Been Away =

1989 television play

- Screen One episode
- Advertisement for a rebroadcast on Masterpiece Theatre
- Episode no.: Series 1 Episode 5
- Directed by: Peter Hall
- Written by: Stephen Poliakoff
- Editing by: Ardan Fisher
- Original air date: 8 October 1989
- Running time: 103 minutes

Guest appearances
- Peggy Ashcroft; James Fox; Michael Carter; Rosalie Crutchley; Donald Douglas; David Hargreaves; Geraldine James; Hugh Lloyd; René Zagger

Episode chronology
← Previous "Home Run"	Next → "The Mountain and the Molehill"

She's Been Away is a 1989 British television film written by Stephen Poliakoff and directed by Sir Peter Hall. In her final appearance it starred Dame Peggy Ashcroft, who won two awards at the Venice International Film Festival for her performance, as did Geraldine James. It was nominated for the BAFTA TV Award for Best Single Drama.

== Plot ==
The closure of a mental institution threatens to leave the elderly Lillian homeless. Her wealthy nephew Hugh takes her in, putting additional strain on his wife Harriet. Gradually, an awkward friendship develops between Harriet, on the verge of a nervous breakdown herself, and Lillian, who has spent fifty years as a mental patient.

== Cast ==
- Peggy Ashcroft as Lillian Huckle
- Geraldine James as Harriet Ambrose
- James Fox as Hugh Ambrose
- Jackson Kyle as Dominic Ambrose
- Rebecca Pidgeon as Young Lillian
- Rosalie Crutchley as Gladys
- Rachel Kempson as Matilda
- Cryss Jean Healey as Young Margaret
- Leslie Goodall as Old Edward
- Edgar Goodall as Old Thomas
- René Zagger as Young Thomas
- Barnaby Holm as Young Edward
- Donald Douglas as Lillian's father
- Hugh Lloyd as George
- Brid Brennan as Lillian's nurse
- David Hargreaves as Lillian's doctor
- Hugh Ross as 1920s doctor
- Carrie Thomas as 1920s nurse
