= Geraldine James =

English actress (born 1950)

Geraldine James OBE
- Born: 6 July 1950 (age 76); Maidenhead, Berkshire, England
- Occupation: Actress
- Years active: 1973–present
- Spouse: Joseph Blatchley (m. 1986)
- Children: 1

Geraldine James (born 6 July 1950) is an English actress. She has worked extensively on television, on stage and in film. She is known for her roles as Sarah Layton in The Jewel in the Crown (1984), Marilla Cuthbert in the Netflix series Anne with an E (2017–2019) and as Queen Mary in the 2019 film Downton Abbey. She won the Volpi Cup for Best Actress for her performance in the television film She's Been Away.

== Early life and education ==
Geraldine James Thomas was born in Maidenhead, Berkshire, on 6 July 1950, the daughter of Gerald Trevor Griffith Thomas, a cardiologist, and his wife Annabella Doogan. Her parents divorced. After failing her 11-plus exam, she was educated at Downe House School in Newbury, Berkshire, where she was known as Gerry Thomas. Embarrassed by her simple surname, she used the grander-sounding name of Vaughan-Thomas while at the school. Her stage name makes use of her middle name of James. James studied drama at the Drama Centre London.

== Career ==
After graduating from the Drama Centre, James spent three years in repertory theatre and school theatre. Her film credits include Gandhi (1982), The Tall Guy (1989), The Wolves of Willoughby Chase (1989), Sherlock Holmes (2009), Alice in Wonderland (2010), The Girl with the Dragon Tattoo (2011), Sherlock Holmes: A Game of Shadows (2011), and 45 Years (2015).

On television, Geraldine James played Sarah Layton in The Jewel in the Crown (1984), Rosemary "Rose" Garrity in Band of Gold (1995) and Gloria Green in The Sins (2000). She is also known as Mrs. Pincher, the breastfeeding mother in Little Britain (2004). From 2017 to 2019, she starred in the Netflix series Anne with an E as Marilla Cuthbert, and in the 2019 film Downton Abbey as Queen Mary. In 2026 she played Mother Adiona in the Netflix series Run Away.

In 2020 James voiced the spoken words on the track "All the Works of Nature Which Adorn the World" ("Vista", "Ad Astra") on the album Human. :II: Nature. by Finnish symphonic metal band Nightwish.

== Awards and recognition ==
James was appointed Officer of the Order of the British Empire (OBE) in 2004.

Theatre director Peter Hall said that James ranks among the great English classical actresses.

| Year | Nominated work | Award | Category | Result | Refs |
|---|---|---|---|---|---|
| 1977 | Dummy | BAFTA TV Award | Best Actress | Nominated | |
| 1984 | The Jewel in the Crown | BAFTA TV Award | Best Actress | Nominated | |
| 1989 | She's Been Away | Venice Film Festival | Volpi Cup for Best Actress | Won | |
| 1990 | The Merchant of Venice | Drama Desk Award | Outstanding Actress in a Play | Won | |
| 1990 | The Merchant of Venice | Tony Award | Best Actress in a Play | Nominated | |
| 1995 | Band of Gold | BAFTA TV Award | Best Actress | Nominated | |
| 2000 | The Sins | BAFTA TV Award | Best Actress | Nominated | |
| 2017 | Anne with an E | Canadian Screen Awards | Best Supporting Actress, Drama | Nominated | |
| 2018 | Anne with an E | Canadian Screen Awards | Best Supporting Actress, Drama | Won | |

== Personal life ==
James is married to actor and director Joseph Blatchley. They have a daughter.

== Selected stage roles ==
- Portia, opposite Dustin Hoffman in the London and Broadway productions of The Merchant of Venice by William Shakespeare
- Hedda Gabler at the Royal Exchange, Manchester in 1993
- Rosalind, in As You Like It, at the RSC, Stratford-upon-Avon, in 2023

== Radio ==
| Date | Title | Role | Director | Station |
|---|---|---|---|---|
| 21 February 2000 – 3 March 2000 | The Hours | | Gaynor Macfarlane | BBC Radio 4 Woman's Hour Drama |
| 21 March 2003 | Baldi: The Book Case | Maggie | Mark Lambert | BBC Radio 4 Afternoon Play |
| 19 April 2003 | Turtle Diary | Neaera | Gaynor Macfarlane | BBC Radio 4 Saturday Play |
| 2005 | The Raj Quartet | Mildred Layton | Jeremy Mortimer | BBC Radio 4 |

== Filmography ==
=== Film ===
- The Dumb Waiter (1979) as Sally
- Bloody Kids (1980) as Ritchie's wife
- Sweet William (1980) as Pamela
- Gandhi (1982) as Mirabehn
- Freedom Fighter (1988) as Krista Donner
- The Tall Guy (1989) as Carmen
- The Wolves of Willoughby Chase (1989) as Mrs. Gertrude Brisket
- Prince of Shadows (1991) as Rebecca Osorio
- If Looks Could Kill – Teen Agent, (1991) as Vendetta Galante
- The Bridge (1992) as Mrs Todd
- No Worries (1993/1994) as school teacher, Australian film, directed by David Erick
- Words Upon the Window Pane (1994) as Mrs. Henderson
- Moll Flanders (1996) as Edna
- The Man Who Knew Too Little (1997) as Dr. Ludmilla Kropotkin
- The Luzhin Defence (2000) as Vera
- Lover's Prayer (2001) as Mother
- Tom & Thomas (2002) as Miss Tromp
- An Angel for May (2002)
- Calendar Girls (2003) as Marie
- Northanger Abbey (2007) as the narrator
- Sherlock Holmes (2009) as Mrs Hudson
- Alice in Wonderland (2010) as Lady Ascot
- Made in Dagenham (2010) as Connie
- The Girl with the Dragon Tattoo (2011) as Cecilia Vanger
- Arthur (2011) as Vivienne Bach
- Sherlock Holmes: A Game of Shadows (2011) as Mrs Hudson
- 45 Years (2015) as Lena
- Alice Through the Looking Glass (2016) as Lady Ascot
- Rogue One (2016) as Jaldine Gerams (Blue 3)
- Daphne (2017)
- Anne with a E (2017) as Marilla Cuthbert
- Megan Leavey (2017) as The Veterinarian
- Beast (2017)
- Downton Abbey (2019) as Mary of Teck
- Benediction (2021)

=== Television ===
| Year | Title | Role | Notes |
|---|---|---|---|
| 1976 | The Sweeney: Pay Off | Shirley Glass | |
| 1977 | Dummy | Sandra X | |
| 1979 | Shoestring | | "Nine tenths of the law." |
| 1981 | The History Man | Barbara Kirk | |
| 1982 | I Remember Nelson | Emma Hamilton | |
| 1984 | The Jewel in the Crown | Sarah Layton | |
| 1985 | Blott on the Landscape | Lady Maud Lynchwood | |
| 1988 | Echoes | Angela O'Hara | |
| 1991 | Inspector Morse: Who Killed Harry Field | Helen Field | |
| 1992 | A Doll's House | Kristine Linde | |
| 1995–1997 | Band of Gold | Rose Garrety | |
| 1995–1999 | Kavanagh QC | Eleanor Harker QC | |
| 1997 | Rebecca | Beatrice | |
| — | Little Britain | Mother of Harvey Pincher | Cameo |
| 2000 | The Sins | Gloria Green | |
| 2003 | State of Play | Yvonne Shaps | |
| 2004 | Hex | Lilith Hughes | |
| 2004 | He Knew He Was Right | Lady Rowley | |
| 2005 | Agatha Christie's Poirot – After the Funeral | Helen Abernethie | |
| 2006 | The Amazing Mrs Pritchard | Hilary Rees-Benson | |
| 2006 | A Harlot's Progress | | |
| 2006 | Ancient Rome: The Rise and Fall of an Empire | Cornelia | |
| 2008 | The Last Enemy | Barbara Turney | |
| 2008 | Heist | Joanna | |
| 2010 | Midsomer Murders | Miranda Bedford | Series 13, episode 8, "Fit for Murder" |
| 2012 | Thirteen Steps Down | Gwendolyn | |
| 2013 | Utopia | Milner | |
| 2015 | Black Work | Chief Constable Carolyn Jarecki | |
| 2016 | The Five | Julia Wells | |
| 2017–2019 | Anne with an E | Marilla Cuthbert | Adaptation of Anne of Green Gables |
| 2019–2021 | Back to Life | Caroline Matteson | |
| 2021 | The Beast Must Die | Joy | |
| 2023 | Silo | Mayor Ruth Jahns | |
| 2024 | This Town | Marie | |
| 2025 | Dope Girls | | |
| 2026 | Run Away | Mother Adiona | |
