= High Courses for Scriptwriters and Film Directors =

Russian film school in Moscow

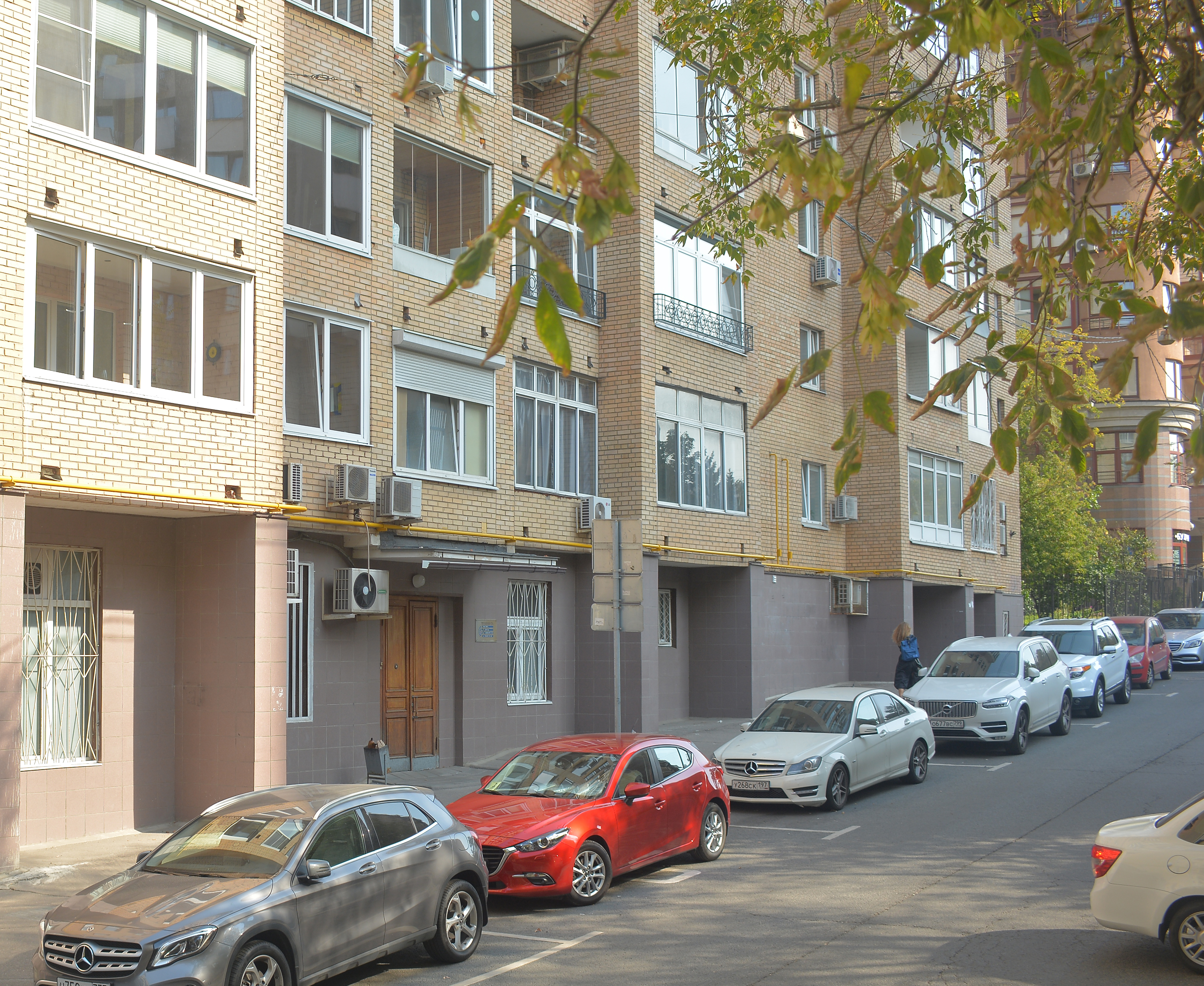

The High Courses for Scriptwriters and Film Directors (HCFDS) (Russian: Высшие курсы сценаристов и режиссёров (ВКСР)) comprises a variety of optional post-graduate film school courses in Moscow, Russia. Its The Advanced Course for Screenwriters and Film Directors is the oldest professional qualification in the cinematographic arts in Russia for people with relevant higher education qualifications.

The school was established in 1963 in the Soviet Union, but its history goes back to 1956. Formerly state-funded, the college is now independent from the state educational establishment in Russia, offering professional education in cinematography, screenwriting, production and direction.
