= Giorgos Panousopoulos =

Greek cinematographer (1942–2026)

- Γιώργος Πανουσόπουλος
- Born: 3 February 1942; Kifissia, German-occupied Greece
- Died: 10 March 2026 (aged 84); Athens, Greece
- Occupations: Cinematographer; Film director Screenwriter
- Years active: 1964–2004
- Spouse(s): Eleni Bourbouchaki (divorced) Betty Livanou (m. 1980)
- Children: 4

Giorgos Panousopoulos (Greek: Γιώργος Πανουσόπουλος; 3 February 1942 – 10 March 2026) was a Greek cinematographer, film director and screenwriter. He worked on 37 films between 1964 and 2004. His 1985 film Mania was entered into the 36th Berlin International Film Festival. His 1989 film Love Me Not? was entered into the 46th Venice International Film Festival.

Panousopoulos died on 10 March 2026, at the age of 84.

== Filmography ==
Directed features
Year	Title	Notes
1967	Abraham begat Isaac, Isaac begat Jacob, Jacob begat...	short film / debut as director; also writer and producer
1974	Friday 9th August	short film; also writer
1979	Honeymoon	also writer and producer
1981	Neighbors (Oi Apenanti)	also writer and producer
1985	Mania	also writer and producer
1988	The coffee	short film; also producer
1989	Love Me Not?	also writer and producer
1995	Free diving	also co-writer and producer
1998	Tafeia - The celebration of the ancestors	short film
2001	One Day at Night	also writer
2004	Testosterone	also writer
2005	Introduction to the opening ceremony, 2004 Olympic Games	
2018	In This Country You Do Not Believe	also writer

Television
Year	Title	Role	Notes
1978	The Lemonforest	Himself (photographer)	TV mini series
1986–1987	Long live the Greek song with Dionysis Savvopoulos	Himself (director)	Saturday variety talk show

As an actor
Year	Title	Role	Notes
1973	John the Violent		acting debut
1974	The effort		
1979	Easy road		
1983	Underground road	Hristos Ioannou	
1983	I am		
1999	Female Company		
2001	One Day at Night	man in the office	
2002	The Bubble	aunt's lover	
2011	Loafing and Camouflage: Sirens at Land	government council members	
