= Ural State Academy of Architecture and Arts =

Public university in Yekaterinburg, Russia

Coordinates: 56°50′25″N 60°36′36″E

Ural State Academy of Visual Arts and Architecture
- Sverdlovsk Institute of Architecture
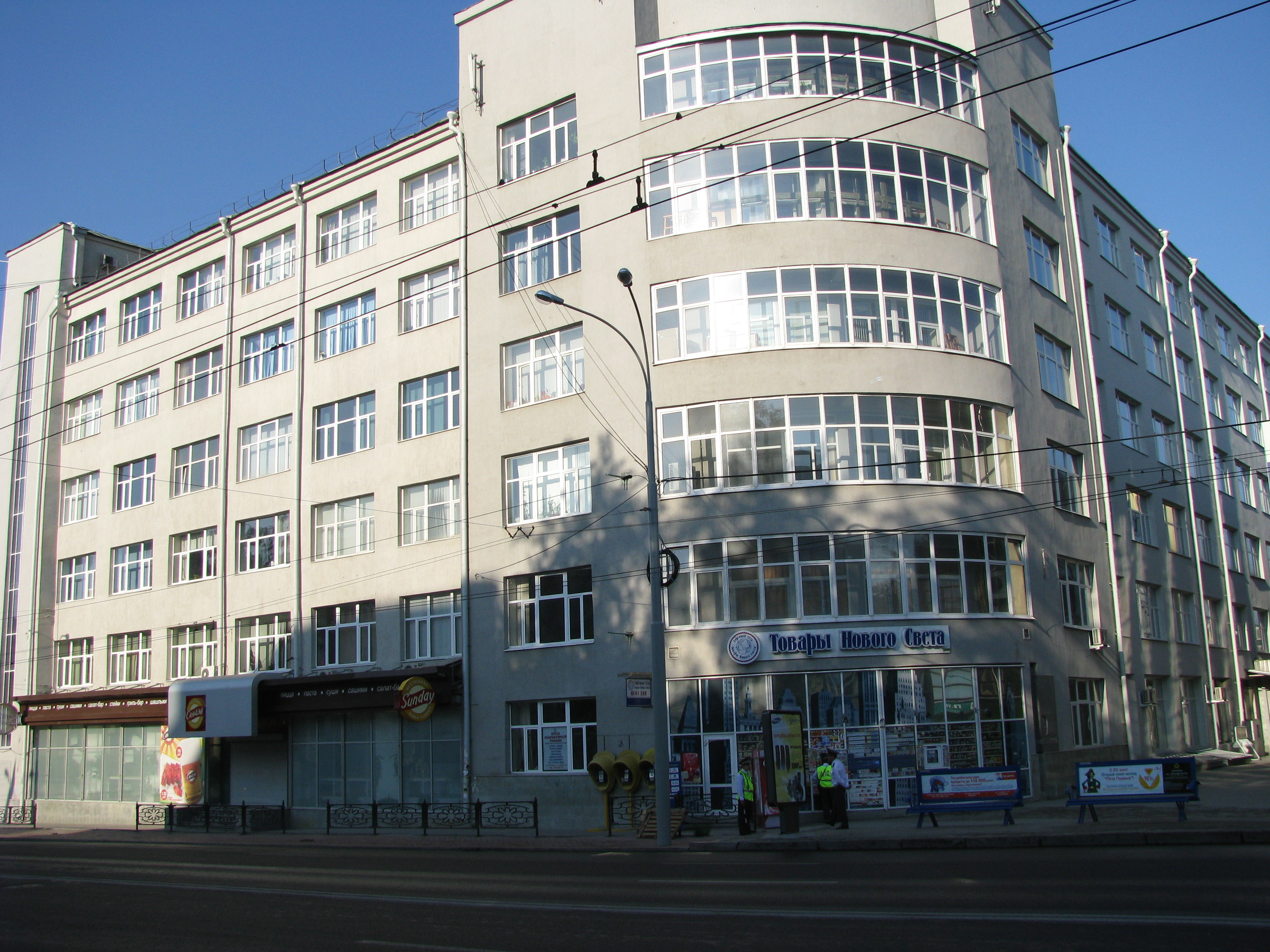
- Type: Liberal Arts
- Established: 1972
- Rector: Prof. Sergey Postnikov
- Students: 2,300
- Location: Yekaterinburg, Russia
- Campus: Urban
- Website: www.usaaa.ru

Urals Academy of Architecture (Ural State Academy of Visual Arts and Architecture; Russian: Уральская государственная архитектурно-художественная академия, often abbreviated USAAA or in Russian УрГАХА) is situated in Yekaterinburg, Russian Federation. It was founded in 1947 as a department of architecture at the Ural State Technical University. Later, in 1967, it was reorganized and became a branch of the Moscow Institute of Architecture which later became an independent school of architecture originally named Sverdlovsk Institute of Architecture.

It is one of the most prestigious schools of design and architecture in Russia. The Academy has twenty chairs, six departments and two institutes (Institute of Visual Arts and Institute of Urbanism). Since 1992 the Academy publishes a science journal Archiecton: izvestiya vuzov ("Architecton: Proceedings of Higher Education").

== Overview ==
The Academy is known for the role it played in forming the rock subculture (subculture of resistance, in fact) in the USSR. The Sverdlovsk Rock Club founded at the Academy in 1986 was a birthplace for a considerable number of famous Russian rock bands such as Urfin Dzhyus, Chaif, Nautilus Pompilius, Nastya, Trek, Agatha Christie.

== Alumni ==
Alyona Azyornaya – Russian Naive Art artist

Vyacheslav Butusov – Soviet and Russian singer and songwriter, one from the founfers of Nautilus Pompilius

Sergej Gladkix – Soviet and Russian architect and artist

Sergej Denisov – Moscow architect, International Academy of Modern Arts vice-president

Aleksandr Dolgov – Soviet and Russian scientist-architect

Oleg Elovoj – Russian artist and the organizer of non-traditional jewelry competition

Ildar Ziganshin – Soviet and Russian designer and photographer

Elena Ignatova – Russian poetress, singer and song writer

Aleksej Karaev – Russian cartoonist

Olga Karapetyan – Russian architect

Yurij Kataev – Soviet and Russian photographer

Viktor Komarov – Soviet and Russian singer and songwriter, one from the partners of Nautilus Pompilius

Aleksandr Korotich – Soviet and Russian artist and designer of The Channel One

Sergej Makarov – Soviet and Russian architect

Oleg Mikheev – Russian and British photographer

Vladimir Pirozhkov – Russian designer, who was designed the Sochi Olympic Games torch

Yurij Rysin – Soviet and Russian architect

Larisa Selyanina – Russian fashion designer and a founder her own fashion brend

Aleksandr Starikov – Russian architect, the rector of USAAA in 1999-2011

Dmitrij Umeczkij – Soviet and Russian musician and songwriter, one from the founfers of Nautilus Pompilius

Kharitidi Aleksej – Russian artist-cartoonist

Vladimir Khotinenko – Soviet and Russian actor, film director and designer

Oksana Cherkasova – Soviet and Russian director of animation films and animator

Salavat Shabiev – Soviet and Russian scientist, the doctor of architecture

Georgij Shishkin – Soviet and Russian artist, designer, the author of some Russian and Monaco postage stamps

Olga Yakubova – Soviet and Russian artist, designer, the author of KAMAZ auto company and sport team style
