= KROK International Animated Films Festival =

Animation film festival

The KROK International Animated Films Festival is an annual international animated film festival, and one of the main animation festivals in the territory of the former Soviet Union. It is held in Russia on even years and in Ukraine on odd years. The film festival takes place over the course of 12 days between September and October on the cruise ship Taras Shevchenko. When in Russia, it cruises along the Volga, and when in Ukraine it cruises along the Dnieper and the Black Sea.

The festival's history began at the 1987, perestroika-era Moscow International Film Festival, where it was decided to create separate contests for documentary, children's and animated films. In 1989, the festival was first held as a separate event. The name "KROK" was thought up by Garri Bardin and means "step" in Ukrainian.

In 1991, with the dissolution of the Soviet Union, it was decided to make the festival international, and it was held on a cruise ship for the first time.

The festival has been put on hold since 2019, owing to the COVID-19 pandemic, with the 25th edition cancelled in 2020.

As well as the competitive categories, the festival also features other animation screenings, events, and lectures. It is often attended by the top animators and directors of animation of the region. The festival is committed to the "ideals of humanism, peace and friendship between nations", using animated films to convey the message.

== See also ==
- History of Russian animation
- Open Russian Festival of Animated Film
