= Dorabjee =

Dorabjee is an Indian given name and surname. Notable people with the name include:

- Dorabjee Naorojee Mithaiwala, Indian businessman
- Vahbbiz Dorabjee (born 1985), Indian model and television actress
