= Star Ferry =

Hong Kong ferry operator

The Star Ferry Company

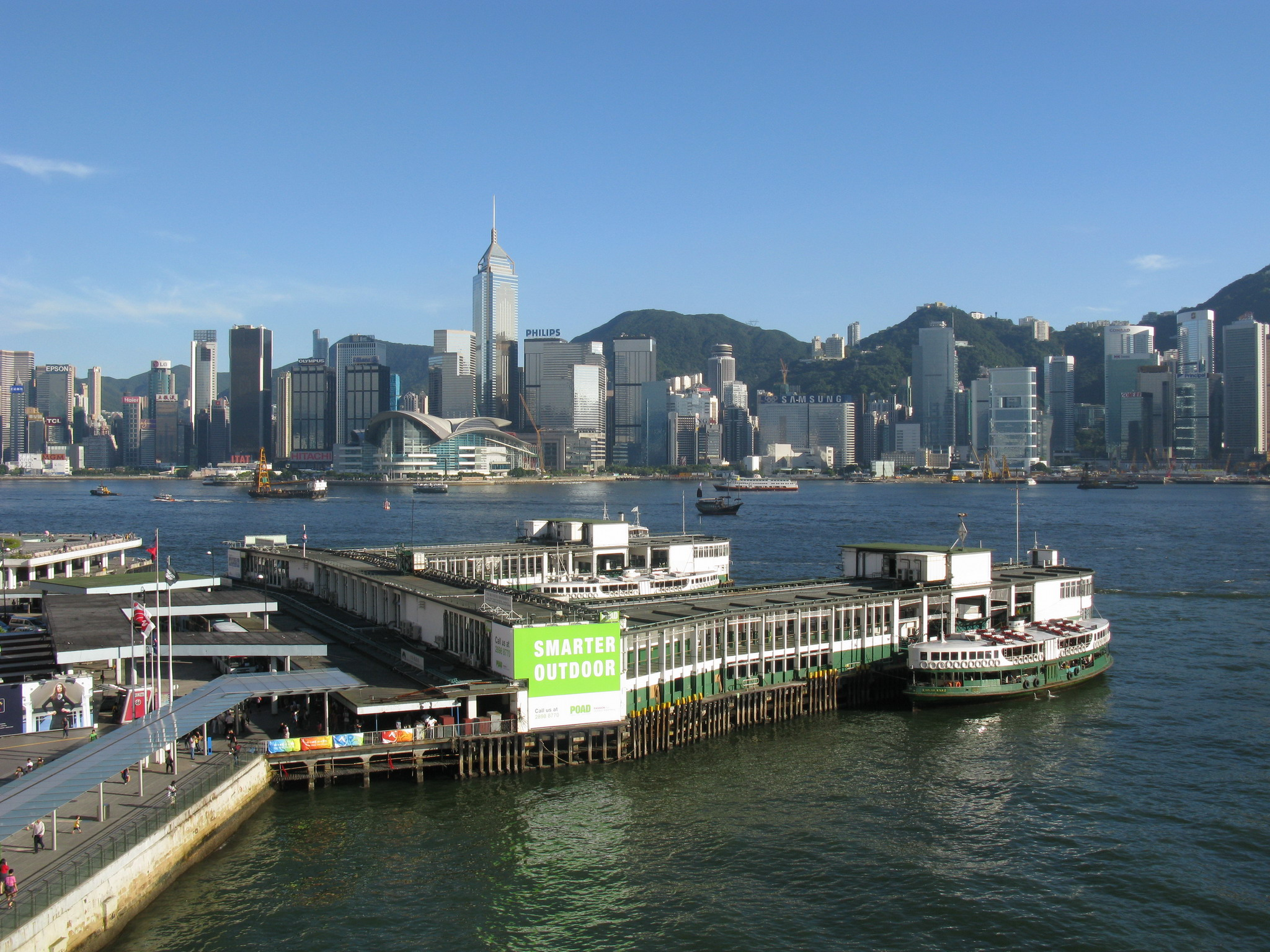
- Star Ferry Pier at Tsim Sha Tsui
- Type: Ferry services across Victoria Harbour
- Founded: 1888; 138 years ago
- Founder: Dorabjee Naorojee Mithaiwala
- Headquarters: Hong Kong
- Revenue: HK$72 million (2006)
- Owner: Wharf REIC (100%)
- Parent: Wharf REIC
- Website: www.starferry.com.hk

Star Ferry
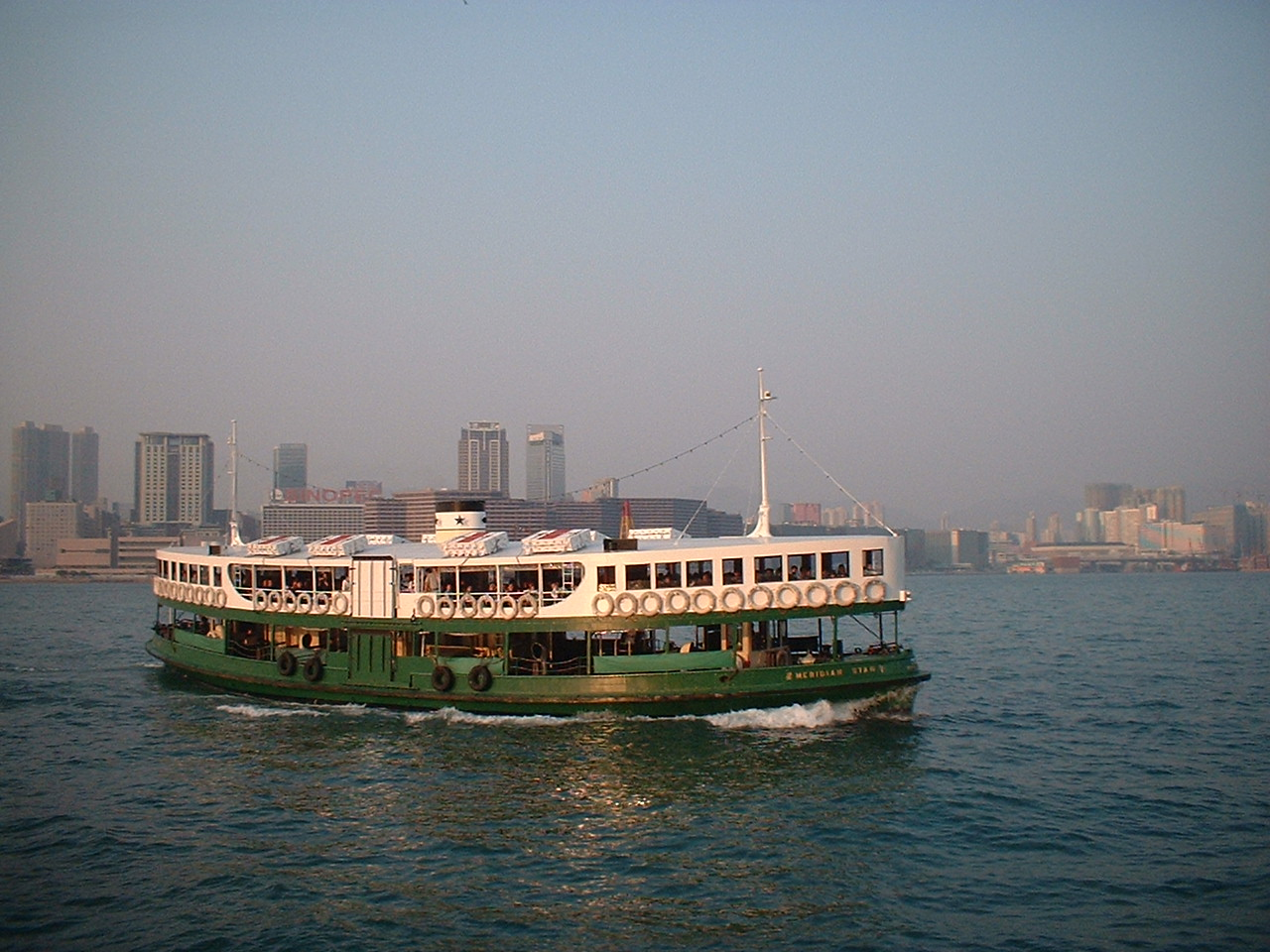
- The ferry Meridian Star
- Traditional Chinese: 天星小輪
Transcriptions
Standard Mandarin
- Hanyu Pinyin: Tiānxīng Xiǎolún
Hakka
- Romanization: Tien^{1}sin^{1} Siau^{3}lin^{2}
Yue: Cantonese
- Yale Romanization: Tīn sīng síu lèuhn
- Jyutping: Tin1 sing1 siu2 leon4
- IPA: [tʰíːn ɕɪ́ŋ ɕǐːu lɵ̏n]

House flag of Star Ferry

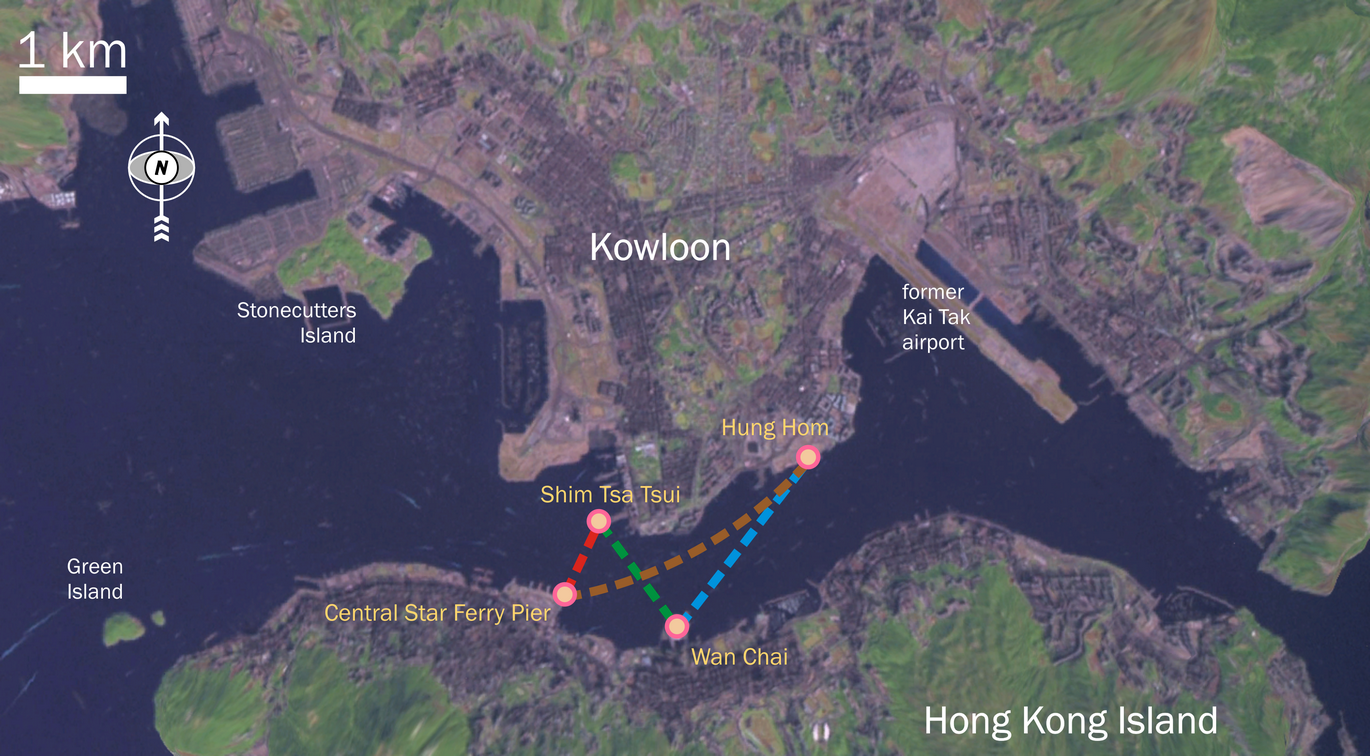
Star Ferry routes as of 2010

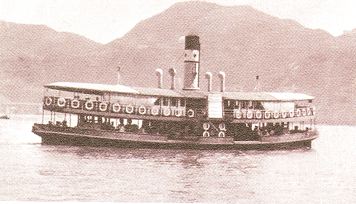
A Star Ferry in the 1920s

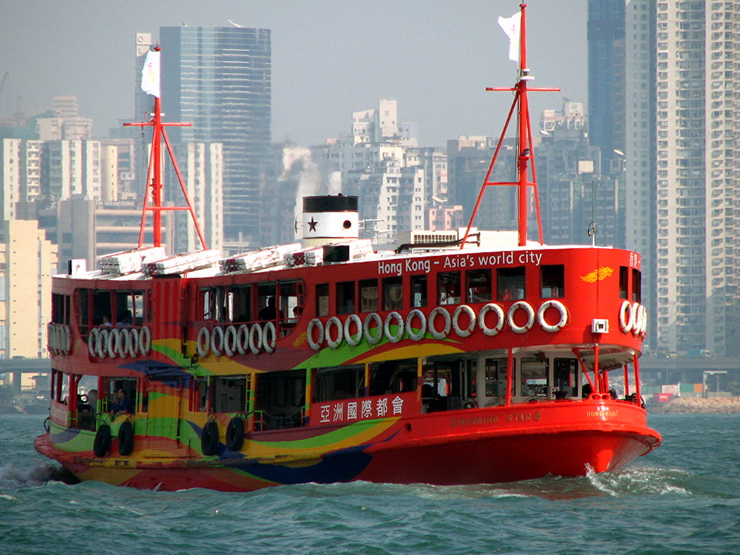
A Star Ferry in Asia's World City livery carries passengers across Victoria Harbour

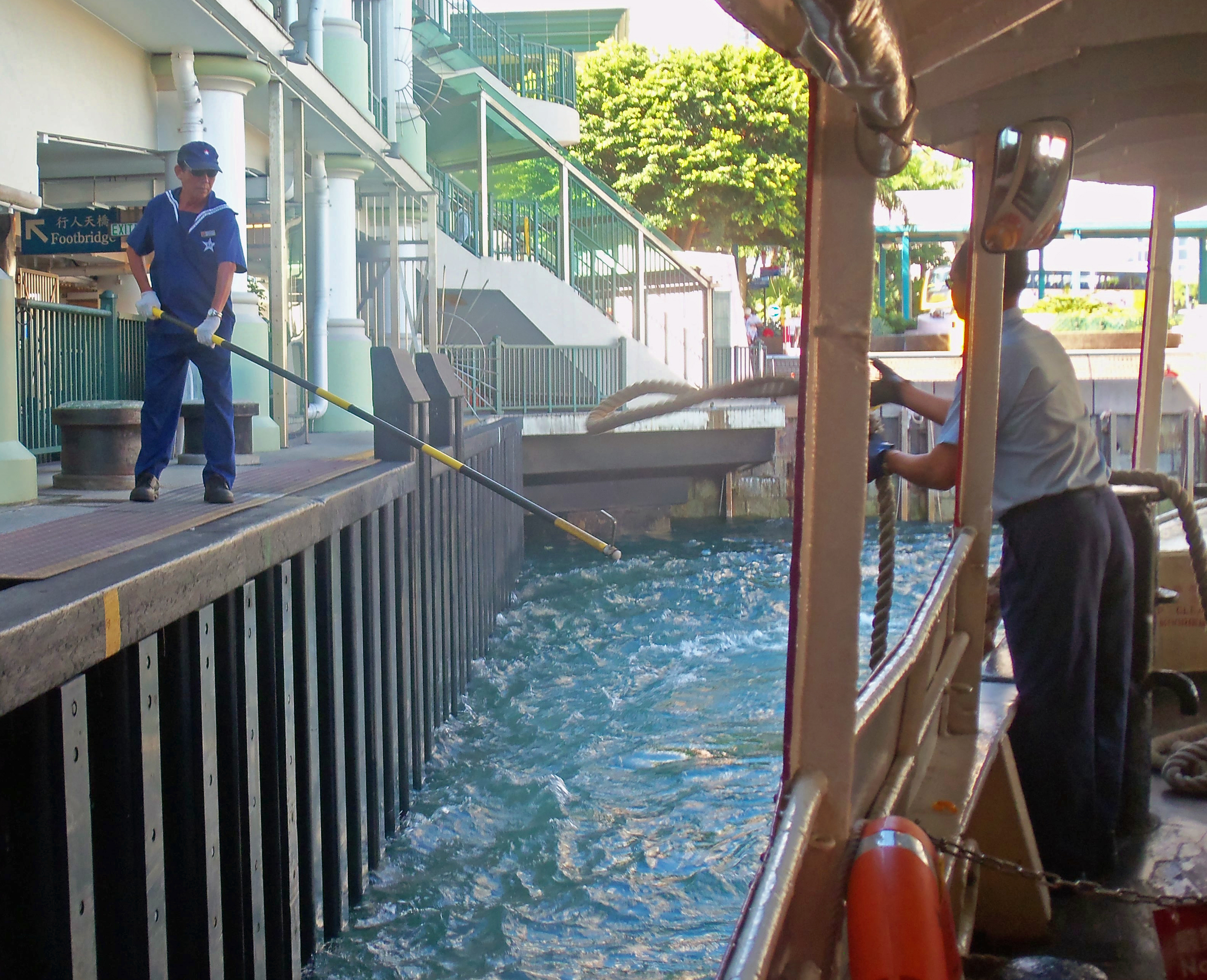
Crew using billhook to moor ferry at Central pier, a method in use since the 19th century

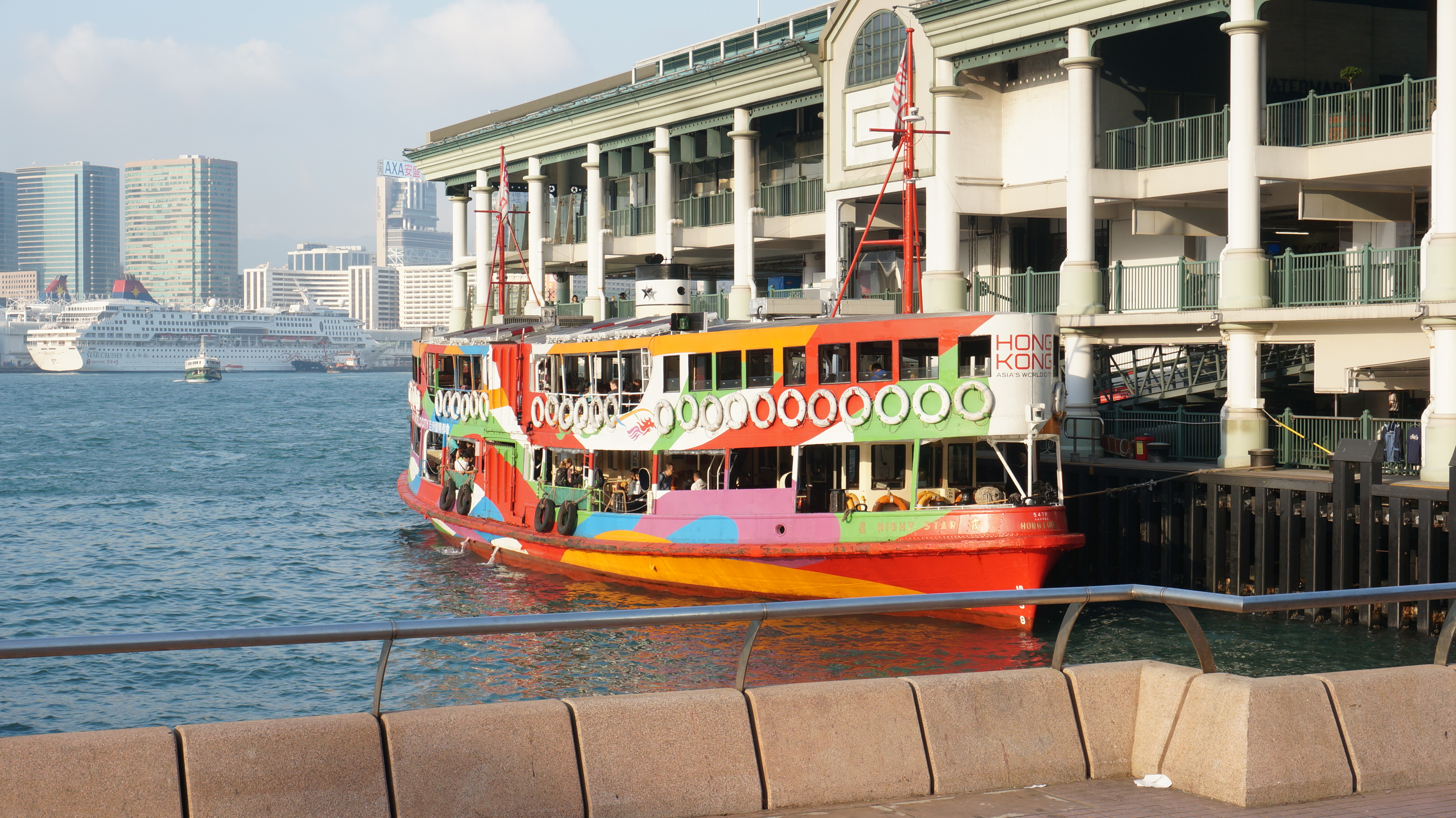
Star Ferry Night Star

The Star Ferry (Chinese: 天星小輪) is a passenger ferry service operator and tourist attraction in Hong Kong. Its principal routes carry passengers across Victoria Harbour, between Hong Kong Island and Kowloon. The service is operated by the Star Ferry Company, which was founded in 1888 as the Kowloon Ferry Company, and which adopted its present name in 1898.

With a fleet of twelve ferries, the company operates two routes across the harbour, carrying over 70,000 passengers per day, or 26 million per year. Even though the harbour is crossed by railway and road tunnels, the Star Ferry continues to provide a scenic yet inexpensive mode of harbour crossing. The company's main route runs between Central and Tsim Sha Tsui.

== History ==
Before the steam ferry service was first established, people crossed the harbour in flat-bottomed wooden boats known as sampans. In 1870, a man named Grant Smith brought a twin-screw wooden-hulled boat from England and started running it across the harbour at irregular intervals.

In July 1873, an attempt was made to run steam ferries between Hong Kong and Kowloon. This was stopped at the request of the British consul in Canton, who feared it would enable visits to gambling houses in Kowloon. It is thought that a service to the public was established in the mid-to-late 1870s, after the cession of Kowloon to the British in 1860.

The company was founded by Parsee merchant Dorabjee Naorojee Mithaiwala as the "Kowloon Ferry Company" in 1888. Naorojee bought Smith's boat, and later acquired two steam vessels from a Mr Buxoo, naming them Morning Star and Evening Star.

At the time regular service was initiated, ships were moored by having a sailor on the vessel toss the rope to another on the pier, who caught it with a long billhook. This is still done today.

The popularity of this means of transport enabled him to increase his fleet to four vessels within 10 years: the Morning Star, Evening Star, Rising Star and Guiding Star. Each boat had a capacity of 100 passengers, and the boats averaged 147 crossings each day. He incorporated the business into the "Star Ferry Co Ltd" in 1898. The ship names and, subsequently, the company name was inspired by his love of Alfred Lord Tennyson's poem "Crossing the Bar", of which the first line reads "Sunset and evening star, and one clear call for me!".

On his retirement in 1898, Naorojee sold the company to The Hongkong and Kowloon Wharf and Godown Company Limited, at that time owned by Jardine, Matheson & Co. and Sir Paul Chater.

A pier constructed on the western end of Salisbury Road opened in 1906, it was a fine massive structure at that time and it also had a separate compartment for the first and second class. However, it was destroyed by a typhoon in September 1906.

At the turn of the century, Hong Kong currency and Canton currency were both accepted as legal tender in Hong Kong. In the autumn of 1912, following a devaluation, the Star Ferry caused a controversy by insisting, together with the tramways, that payment had to be made in Hong Kong currency only. Canton coinage was no longer accepted.

In 1924, the Yaumati Ferry operated the route to Kowloon in a duopoly. In 1933, the Star Ferry made history by building the Electric Star, the first diesel electric passenger ferry of its kind.

By 1941, the company had six vessels. During the Japanese occupation of Hong Kong, the competing Yaumati Ferry was allowed to continue, while the Japanese commandeered the Star Ferry for their own purposes. The Golden Star and the Meridian Star were used to transport prisoners of war from Sham Shui Po to Kai Tak Airport. In 1943, the Golden Star was bombed and sunk in the Canton River by the Americans, and the Electric Star was sunk in the harbour. After the war, the ferries were recovered and returned to service.

In the early 1950s, construction of the present twin-piered terminal commenced on both sides of Victoria Harbour, designed to handle 55 million passenger trips a year. The structure was completed in 1957, concurrent with the Edinburgh Place Ferry Pier built on the island side.

The Star Ferry accepted the request by the government of operating the Hung Hom route in 1963. It almost failed to operate as the company thought it could not make profit from it. But with the reconsideration by the Star Ferry, the route was confirmed to be operating starting from March 1965.

Until the opening of the Cross-Harbour Tunnel in 1972, the Star Ferry remained the main means of public transportation between Hong Kong Island and the Kowloon side.

It was rated first in the "Top 10 Most Exciting Ferry Rides" poll by SATW (Society of American Travel Writers) in February 2009.

The Star Ferry operates on a franchise from the government, which was last renewed in March 2018.

=== Public protests ===
In 1966, a fare increase of 5 cents (or 25%) of the ferry was a political milestone, as it caused a 27-year-old student to go on hunger strike in protest at the Edinburgh Place terminal. His arrest sparked the 1966 Hong Kong riots.

On 11 November 2006, the end of an era was marked when the third generation pier in Central, the Edinburgh Place Ferry Pier, ended its mission, along with the big clock tower. The pier was destroyed to make way for reclamation, amidst great controversy and peaceful but reasonable protests.

== Services ==
=== Existing ===
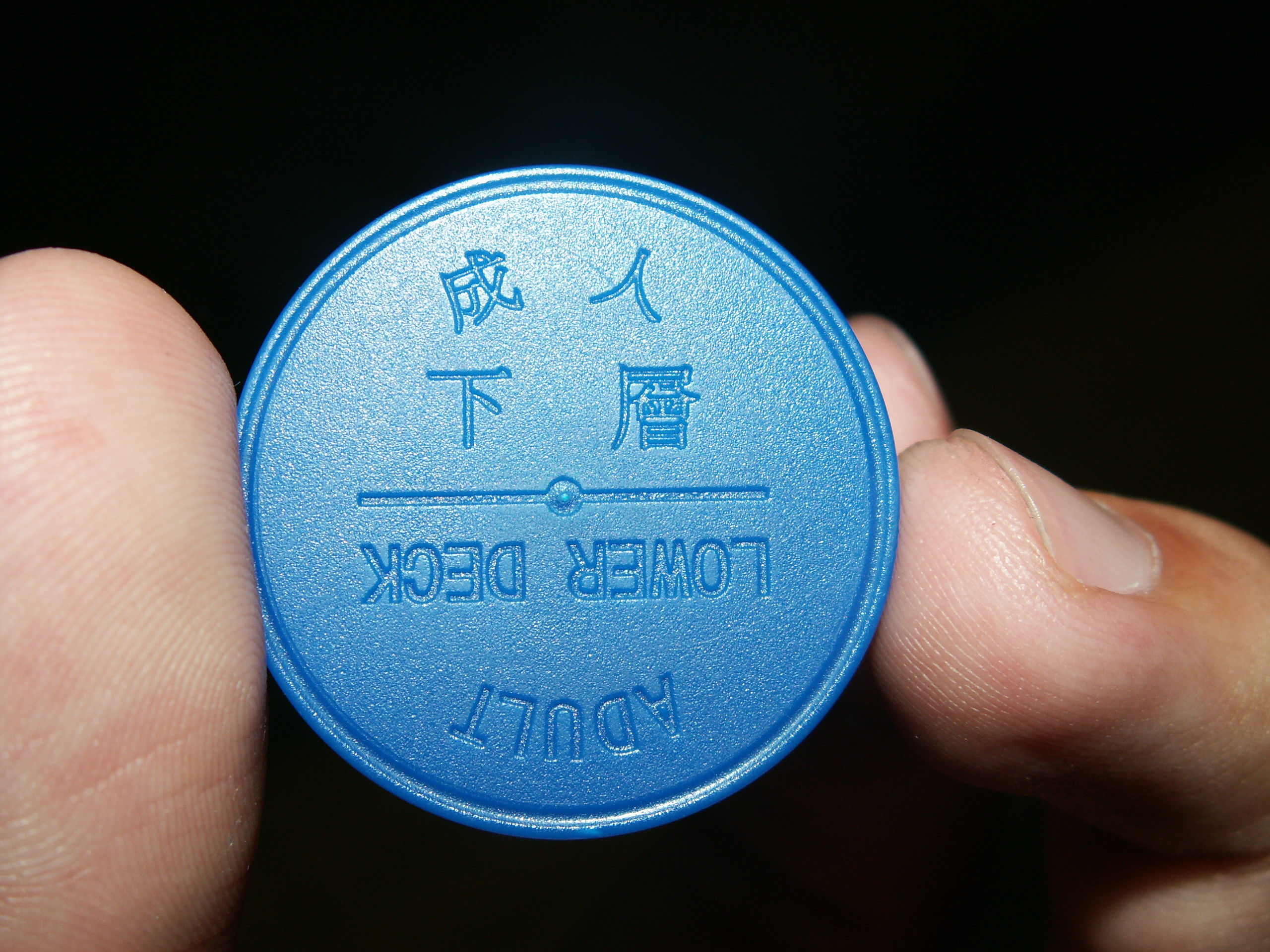
An adult Star Ferry token or jeton

The Star Ferry operates the following cross-harbour routes (the fares (in HK$ below) are effective from 9 February 2021):

- Central to Tsim Sha Tsui. For lower deck, it costs $4 on Mondays to Fridays; $5.60 on Saturdays, Sundays and public holidays. For upper deck, $5 on Mondays to Fridays; $6.50 on Saturdays, Sundays and public holidays.
- Wan Chai to Tsim Sha Tsui for $5 on Mondays to Fridays; $6.50 on Saturdays, Sundays and public holidays.
- Harbour Tour: a tourist cruise, making an indirect, circular route to all the stops, namely Tsim Sha Tsui, Central and Wan Chai.

Passengers may use Octopus or tokens (Jeton) to pay for the ride. Tokens are available in the vending machines at the piers. Direct payment by coins at turnstile is no longer accepted.

The Tsim Sha Tsui – Central route does not accept cycles, but the Tsim Sha Tsui – Wan Chai route accepts cycles for an extra charge of $14, except during the evening peak hour from Wan Chai to Tsim Sha Tsui.

- Tsim Sha Tsui to Hong Kong Disneyland.

Star Ferry has announced plans to provide sightseeing service between Tsim Sha Tsui and Disneyland Resort Pier, which has been empty since its opening. This route consists of two departures and the round trip fare is $180. Passengers can enjoy views of Tsing Ma Bridge during the 45-minute journey on the luxury ferry World Star.

=== Former ===
- Central to Hung Hom for $6.30, terminated effective 1 April 2011.
- Wan Chai to Hung Hom for $6.30, terminated effective 1 April 2011.

=== Charter and hire ===
The Star Ferry "Golden Star' is available for daily charter, for up to 300 people, having been refurbished for cruises and functions, with tables, larger sightseeing windows, an air-conditioned area, and a public address and music system.

== Fleet ==
There are currently 9 diesel-electric ferries in the fleet, together with a tug.

Over the years, the fleet has included:

Star Ferry Fleet
Name	IMO	Reg	Year Built	Builder	Seats	Notes	Image (green and white livery)	Image (other colors)
Morning Star (曉星號)			1871	English-built steamboat	app 100	The first "Star" Ferry, served from 1871 to 1898	The first Morning Star	
Evening Star (夜星號)			1888	English-built steamboat	100	The second "Star" Ferry, served from 1888 to 1902		
Rising Star (高星號)			1890		100	Served from 1890 to 1902		
Guiding Star (導星號)			1896		100	Served from 1896 to 1904		
Morning Star (曉星號)						Served from 1898 to 1903	The first Morning Star	
Northern Star (北星號)			1900			Served from 1900 to 1959		
Southern Star			c. 1900					
Polar Star (極星號)			1901			Served from 1901 to 1927		
Morning Star (曉星號)						Served from 1904 to 1928	The first Morning Star	
Electric Star (電星號)			1933			Served from 1933 to 1968, sunk in 1943 (and later recovered) and converted to diesel boat in 1948		
Golden Star (金星號)			1928			Served from 1928 to 1968, sunk in 1943 (and later recovered) and converted to diesel boat in 1953. Available for daily charter		
Celestial Star (天星號)	8951360	A2071	1956–2011	Hong Kong & Whampoa Dock	576	Currently the oldest vessel in service	Celestial Star	
Radiant Star (耀星號)			1956–1971	Likely Hong Kong & Whampoa Dock		Featured in the film The World of Suzie Wong		
Meridian Star (午星號)	5232725	A2671	1958	Hong Kong & Whampoa Dock	484	Modified in 2012 as back-up vessel for Star Ferry Harbour Tour; subsequently re-modified to ordinary ferry standard in 2013	Meridian Star	
Solar Star (日星號)	5333335	A2681	1958	Hong Kong & Whampoa Dock	547		Solar Star	
Northern Star (北星號)	8951372	A2971	1959	Hong Kong & Whampoa Dock	547		Northern Star	
Night Star (夜星號)	8891091	A3136	1963	Hong Kong & Whampoa Dock	576	Named for original Kowloon Ferry Company's Night Star	Night Star	Night Star
Day Star (晨星號)	8891120	A4041	1964	Hong Kong & Whampoa Dock	576		Day Star	Day Star
Shining Star (輝星號)	8891118	A3841	1964	Hong Kong & Whampoa Dock	576	Now used for the Star Ferry Harbour Tour (top sections were opened up); reproduction of 3rd generation ferries c. 1920s	Shining Star	
Twinkling Star (熒星號)	8891132	A2961	1964	Hong Kong & Whampoa Dock	576		Twinkling Star	Twinkling Star
Morning Star (曉星號)	8891144	A2801	1965	Hong Kong & Whampoa Dock	399	Named for original Kowloon Ferry Company's Morning Star; Retrofitted with Caterpillar diesel-electric propulsion system in 2020	Morning Star	Morning Star
Silver Star (銀星號)	8891156	A4241	1965	Hong Kong & Whampoa Dock	399	Retrofitted with Caterpillar diesel-electric propulsion system in 2021	Silver Star	
Golden Star (金星號)	8951384	A5153	1989–2011	Wang Tak Engineering & Shipbuilding Ltd	762	Sold to private owner in 2011.	Golden Star	
World Star (世星號)	8890968	A5243	1989–2011	Wang Tak Engineering & Shipbuilding Ltd	762		World Star	
Glowing Star (耀星號)				Hong Kong Shipyard	288	ex-British Army vessel rented by Star Ferry between 2001 and 2005		
Kowloon						Tugboat		
Pacific Princess	8624527		1971			Bought from Australia as Temeraire II, and in fleet from 1988 to 1994 as Lady Star (后星號); subsequently modified to corporate yacht of Kowloon Wharf Group		Pacific Princess (ex Lady Star)

== Piers ==
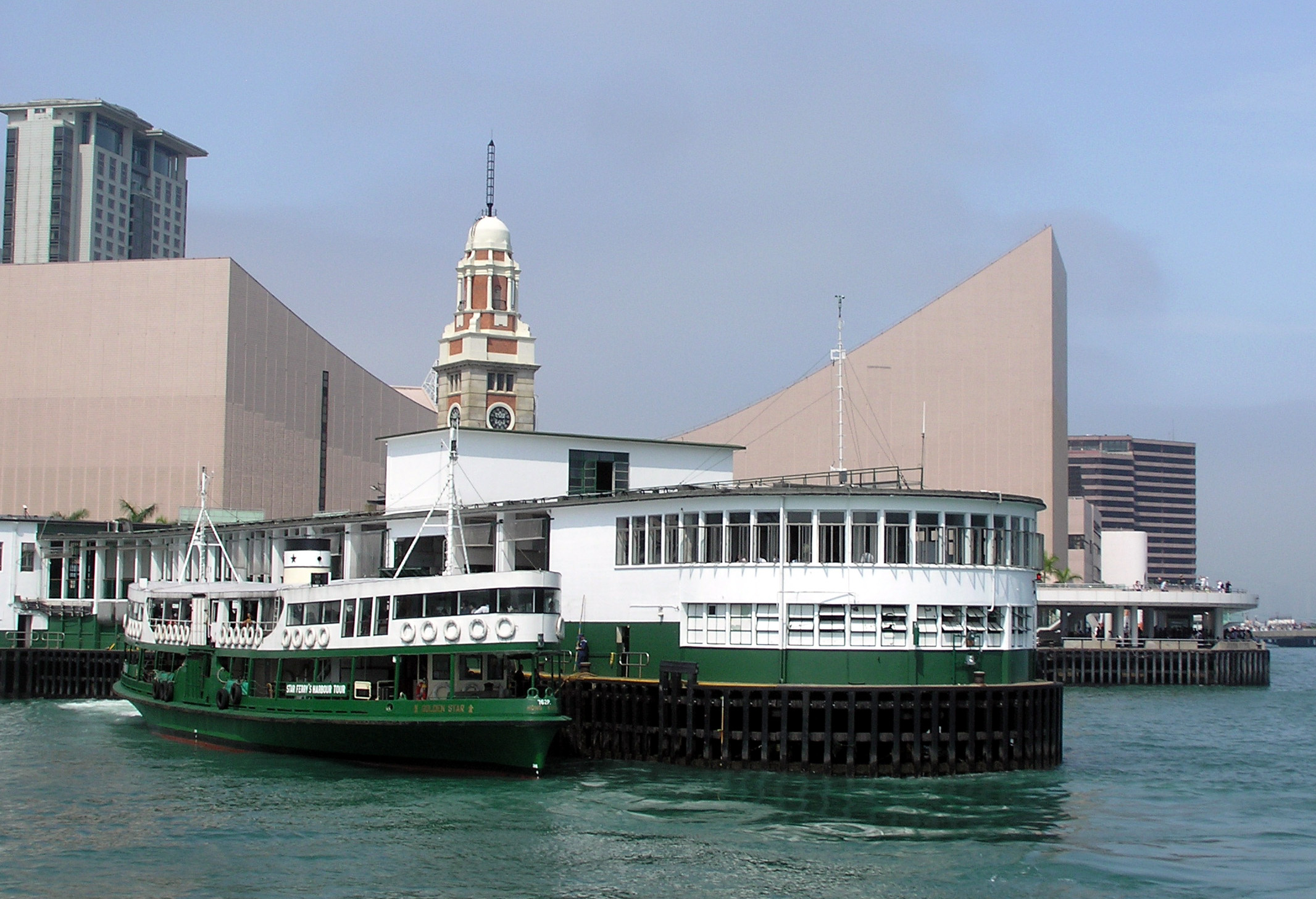
The Tsim Sha Tsui Ferry Pier for Star Ferry

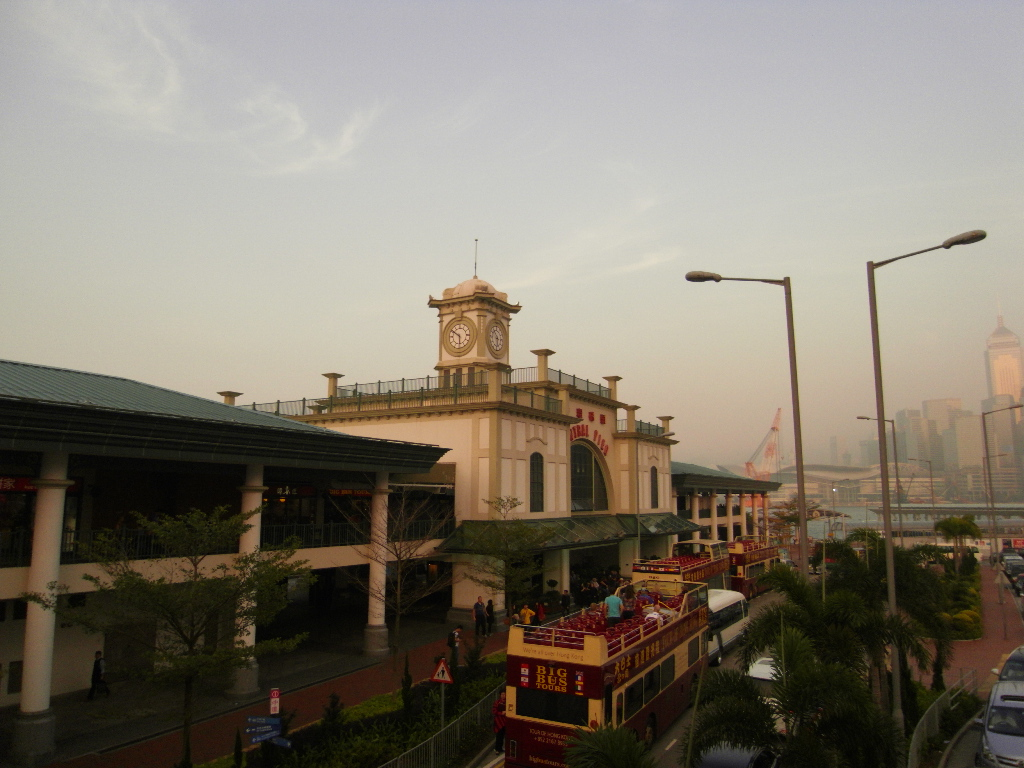
The façade of the fourth-generation Star Ferry Pier in Central, Hong Kong

- Star Ferry Pier, Central at Central District
  - First Generation (1890) Pedder Street and Chater Road
  - Second Generation (1912) at Pedder Street, the present site of Jardine House
  - Third Generation (1957) near Edinburgh Place
  - Fourth Generation (2006) at Man Kwong Street
    - Piers 7 and 8 of Central Ferry Piers until 2011. Pier 7 served Tsim Sha Tsui, while Pier 8 served Hung Hom
    - Piers 7 of Central Ferry Piers since 2011. Pier 8 was converted into a museum in 2013.
- Star Ferry Pier at Tsim Sha Tsui (1957)
- Wan Chai Pier
  - Second Generation (1968), closed effective 29 August 2014.
  - Third Generation (2014), in service since 30 August 2014.
- Hung Hom Ferry Pier, service terminated effective 1 April 2011.

== Financial problems ==
Since the Central Star Ferry Pier was moved from its old pier next to City Hall to the new location outside International Finance Centre, passenger numbers have fallen drastically to mainly tourists and a small number of commuters. This has meant the Star Ferry company has lost many millions of dollars since the relocation. Therefore, it decided not to re-tender for the loss-making Hung Hom-Central and Hung Hom-Wan Chai routes and stopped operating these routes and the relevant piers at Hung Hom Ferry Pier on 31 March 2011.

== Filmography ==
The Star Ferry appears in the 1960 film The World of Suzie Wong. In the beginning of the film, Robert Lomax (played by William Holden) disembarks from the SS President Wilson (an old American President Lines transpacific passenger vessel) and takes the Star Ferry to Hong Kong Island, and on the ferry meets Suzie Wong (played by Nancy Kwan), who scorns his attentions.

The port appears in the 1991 movie Double Impact.

Several brief scenes in the 1988 TV miniseries Noble House are set aboard the ferry. It also appears in the French films Les Anges gardiens (1995) and The Moustache (2005).

== See also ==
- Hong Kong & Kowloon Ferry
- List of places in Hong Kong
- Transport in Hong Kong
