= Moaning sandbar =

Harbor shoals that are known for tidal noises

Moaning sandbars are harbor shoals that are known for tidal noises. Water flowing over a sandbar, typically around low tide, can coincide with both low, sustained noises and turbulence dangerous for smaller boats. In English-speaking culture, phrases such as "moaning of the bar" connect these sounds with mortal danger.

In the mid-19th-century, the phrase "the harbor bar be moaning" in the poem and lyric "Three Fishers" connected working-class suffering to the noises.

Later in that century, Alfred Lord Tennyson wrote "Crossing the Bar", coupling "May there be no moaning of the bar" with images of life's end, and then designated it as essentially his own requiem. This came soon after his making a trying sea journey across the Solent. It is speculated that on the same trip, he may have heard such sounds at Salcombe, which has had a long history of wrecks. That idea is enhanced by the capsizing, three decades later, of Salcombe's town lifeboat The William and Emma on the Salcombe bar, causing the loss of 14 of her 15 crew.
