= Brand Hong Kong =

Hong Kong branding campaign

- Current owner: Information Services Department, Hong Kong Government
- Country: Hong Kong
- Markets: International
- Website: www.brandhk.gov.hk

Brand Hong Kong (BrandHK) is a government programme launched in 2001 designed to promote Hong Kong as "Asia’s World City." The purpose of this concept is to create a reputation for Hong Kong as a top international city. This idea was formed after the transfer of sovereignty over Hong Kong in 1997, the event that made Hong Kong a special administrative region of China. The branding features Hong Kong as a place of "creativity, entrepreneurship, global connectivity, security, and rich diversity."

Brand HK, often referred to in the context of Hong Kong, can pertain to various sectors, including fashion, technology, and local culture. It is also associated with local brands or products that emphasize Hong Kong’s unique identity.

In 2010, following a major review and public engagement exercise, BrandHK was updated, incorporating changes to its visual identity, core values, attributes, and brand platform.

== History ==
The idea of “branding” Hong Kong originated in 1997, when more attention was focused on the handover of Hong Kong to China. The handover led to concerns over Hong Kong's ability to remain as an international financial centre as well as a global city. The decision to develop BrandHK was finally taken by the Government of Hong Kong in 2000.

Extensive research and consultation was undertaken in Hong Kong and internationally. This led to the choice of “Asia’s World City” as the brand motto that best reflects the city's traits. A stylised dragon was considered to best represent the Hong Kong's visual identity. The Government Review in 2008 was undertaken to identify changes that had taken place in and around the city since 2001 and to incorporate those changes into the brand.

== Promotions ==
The Government of Hong Kong has strongly promoted such branding, which has become well-known by the people of Hong Kong. Promotional items and banners have been seen on buses, ships, streets banners and more.

=== First generation ===
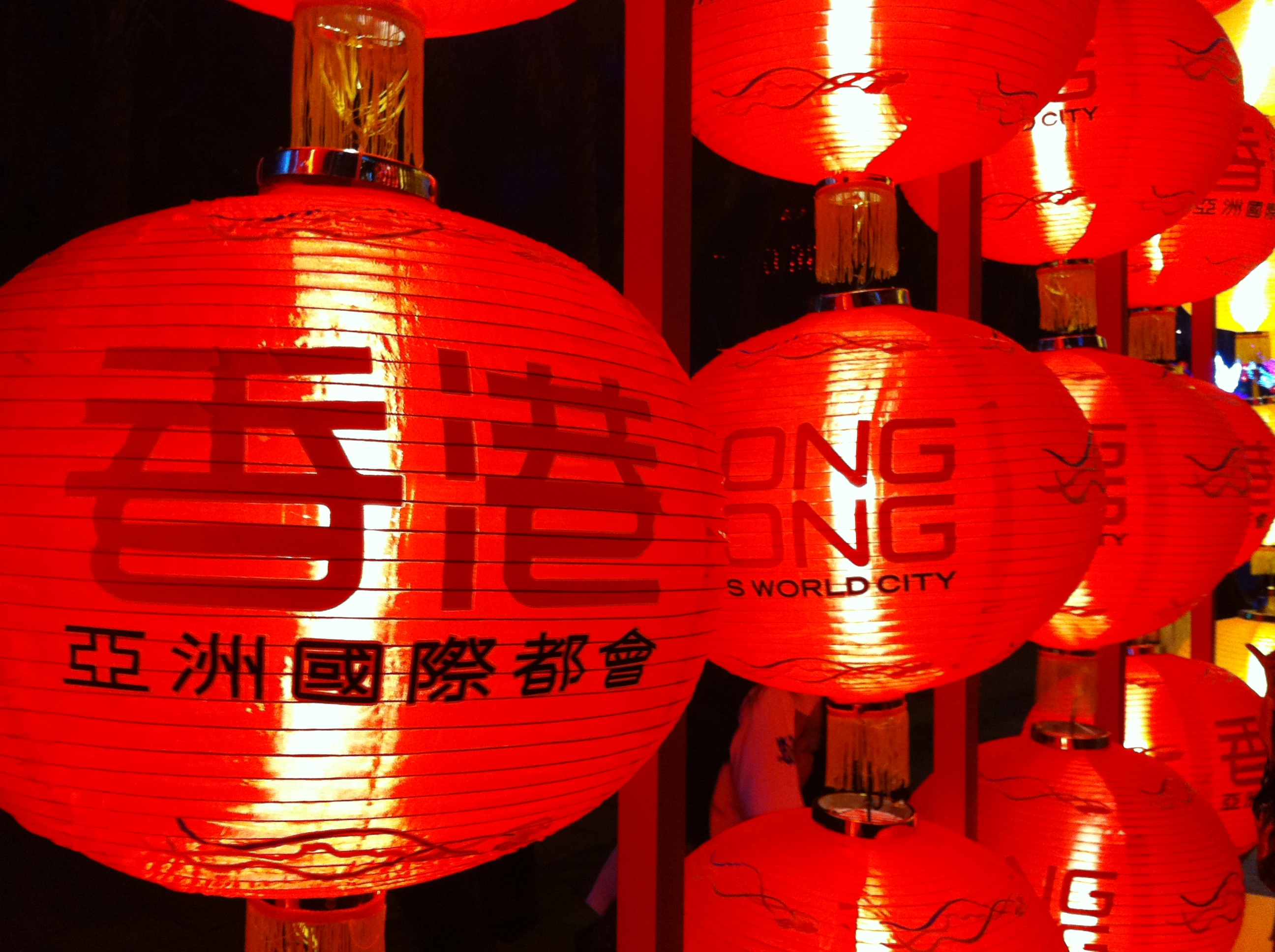
BrandHK printed on red lanterns in Victoria Park

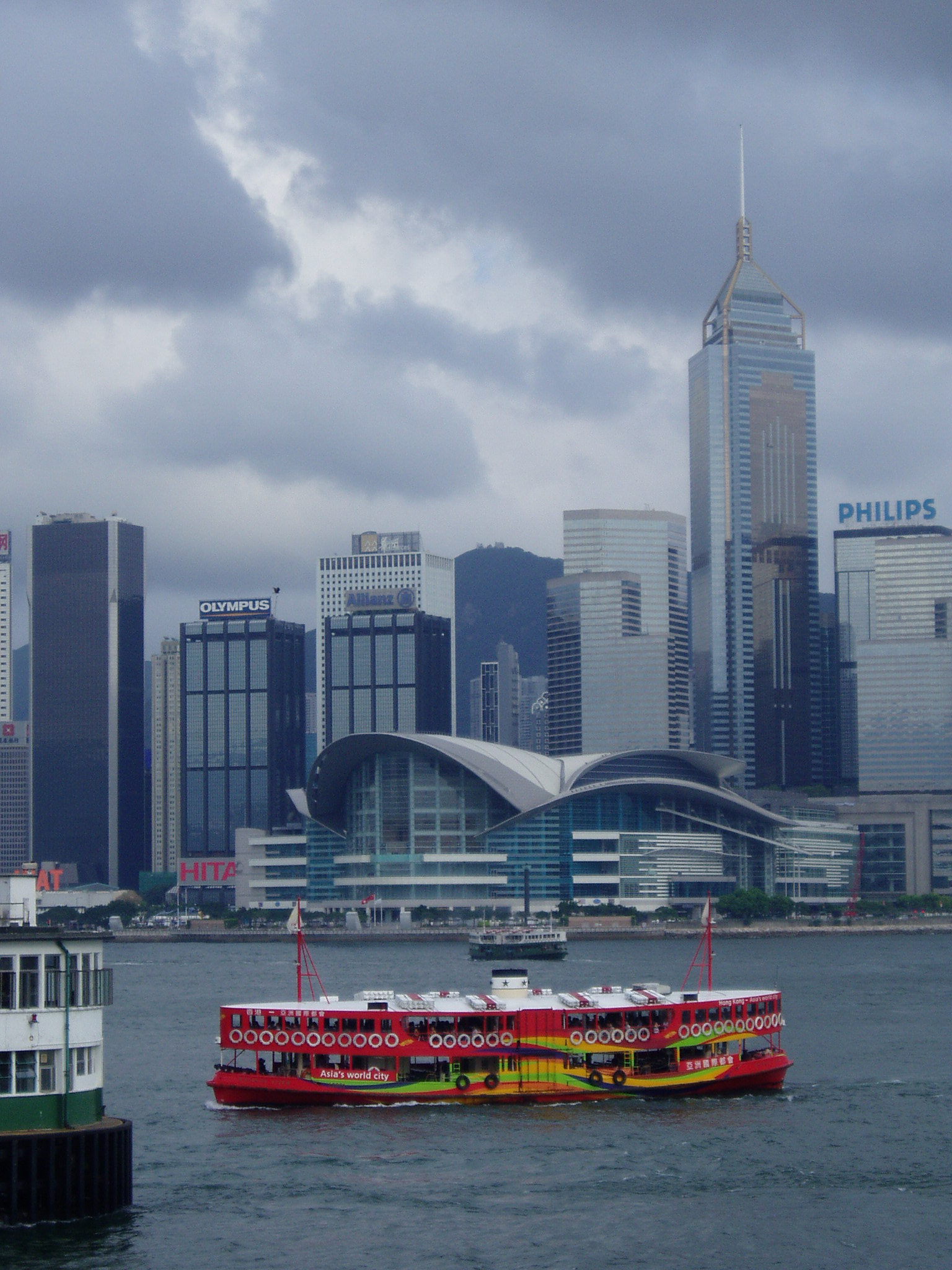
Branding on the exterior of a Star Ferry

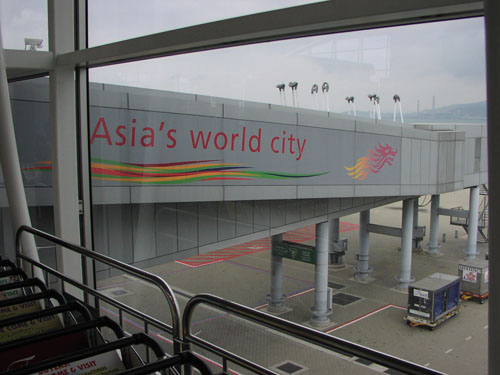
Branding in the Hong Kong International Airport

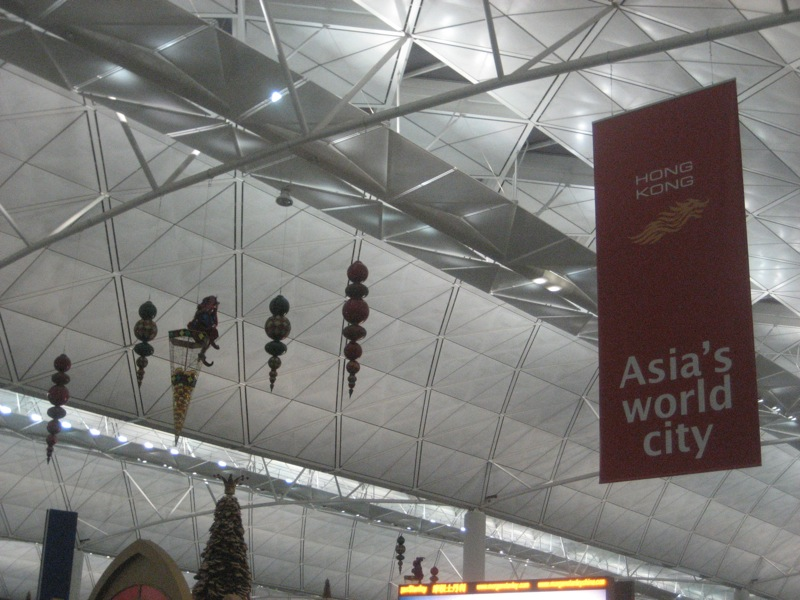
Banners in the Hong Kong International Airport

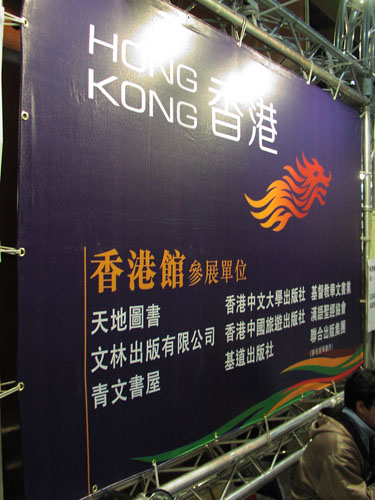
Promotional poster captured in the Taipei International Book Exhibition Hong Kong's booth

=== Second generation ===
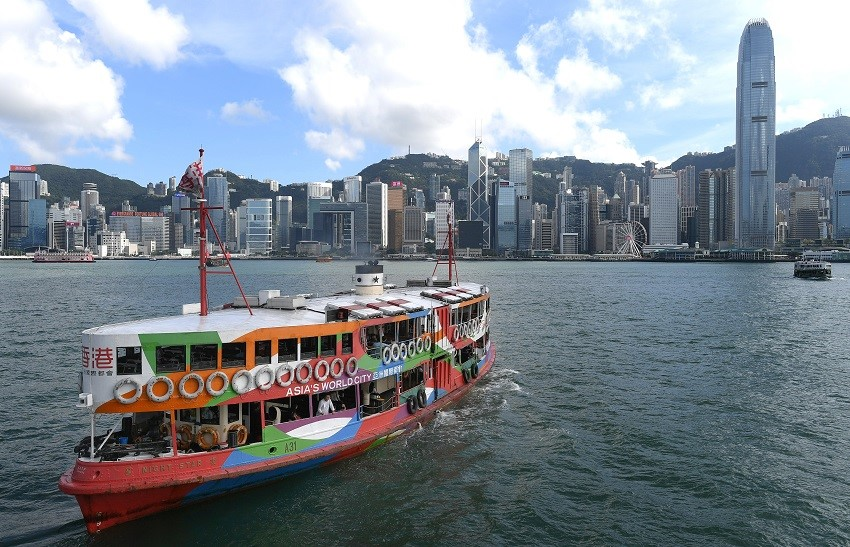
Branding on the exterior of a Star Ferry

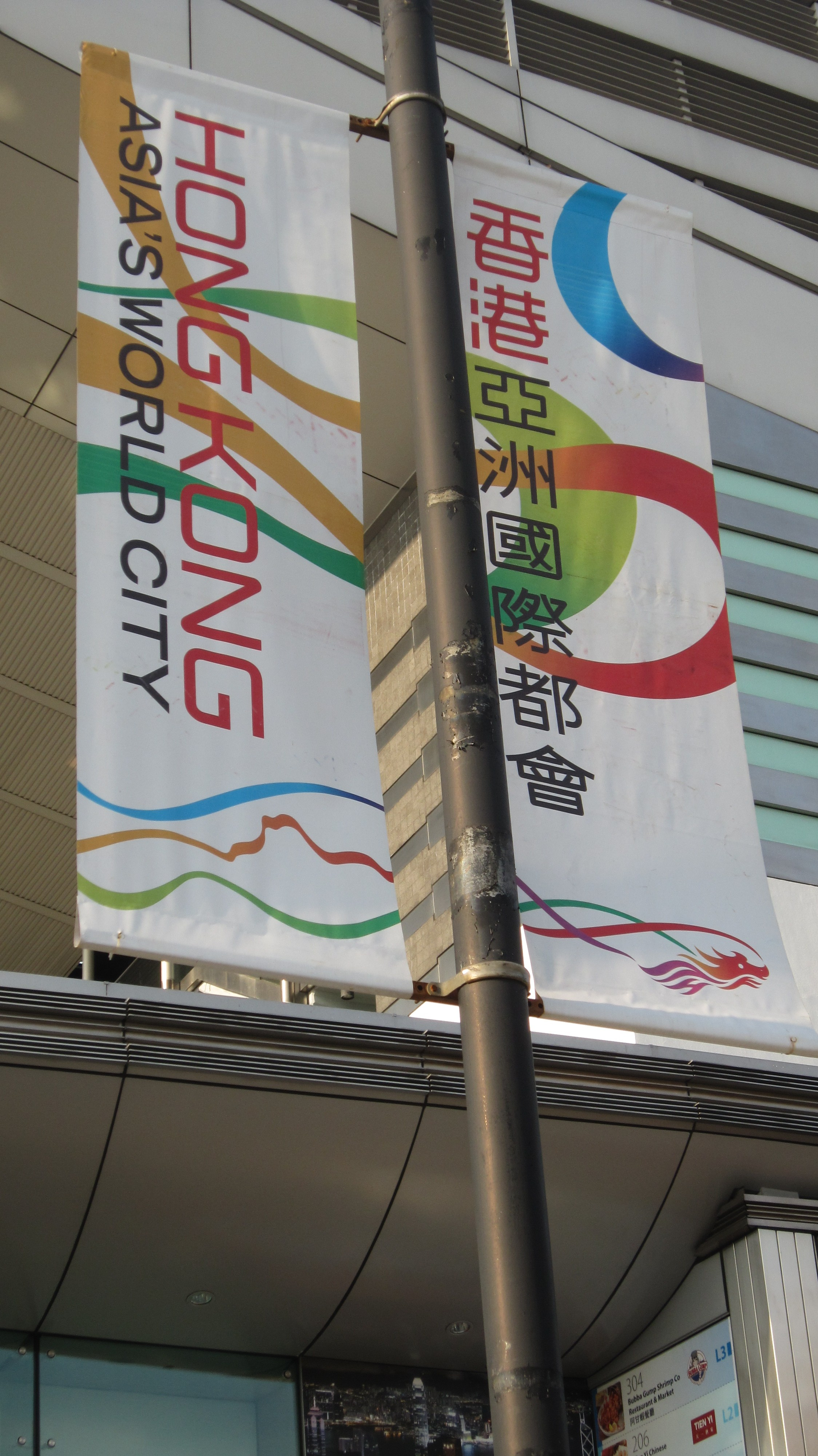
Promotional banners on the streets

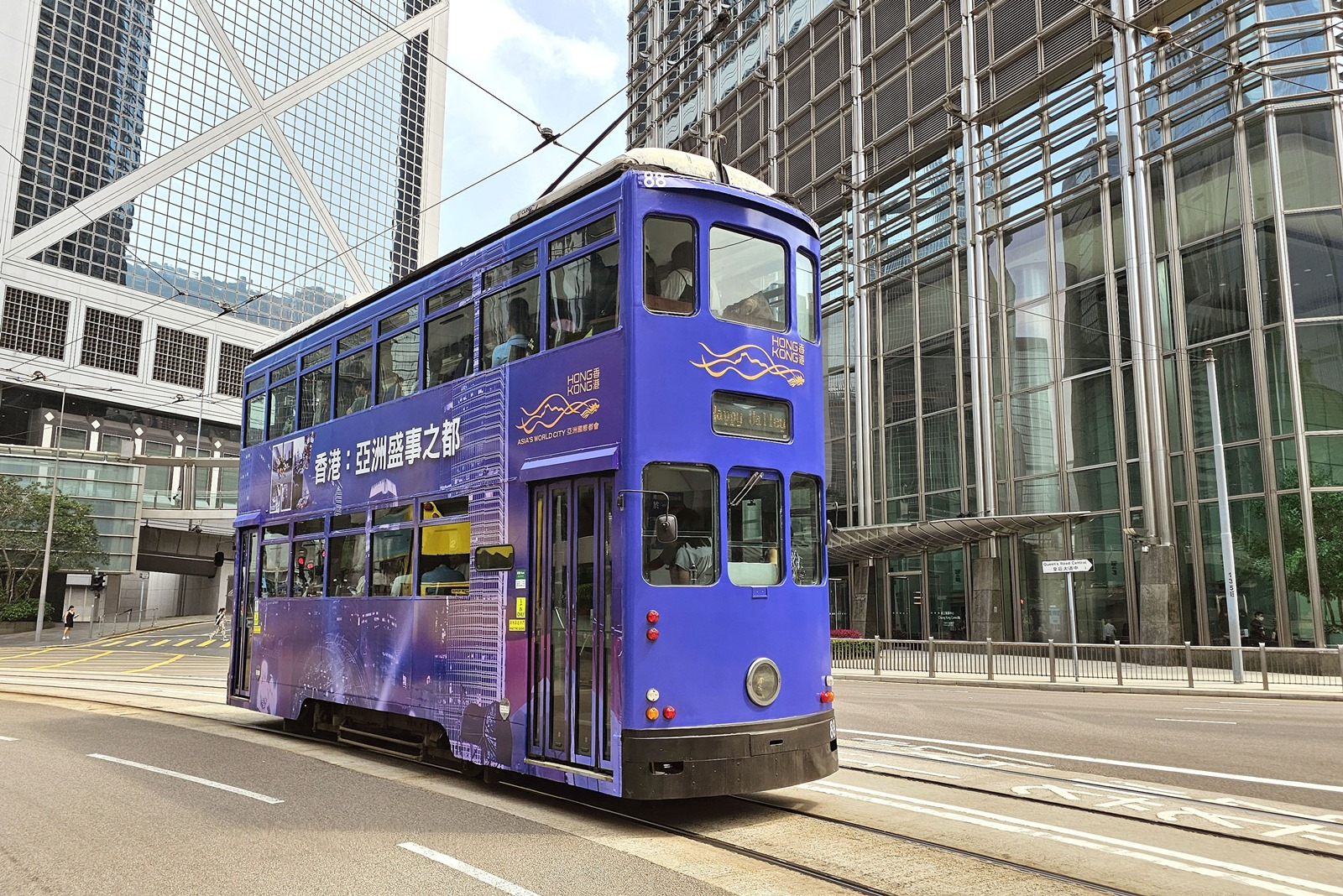
Branding on the exterior of the Tram

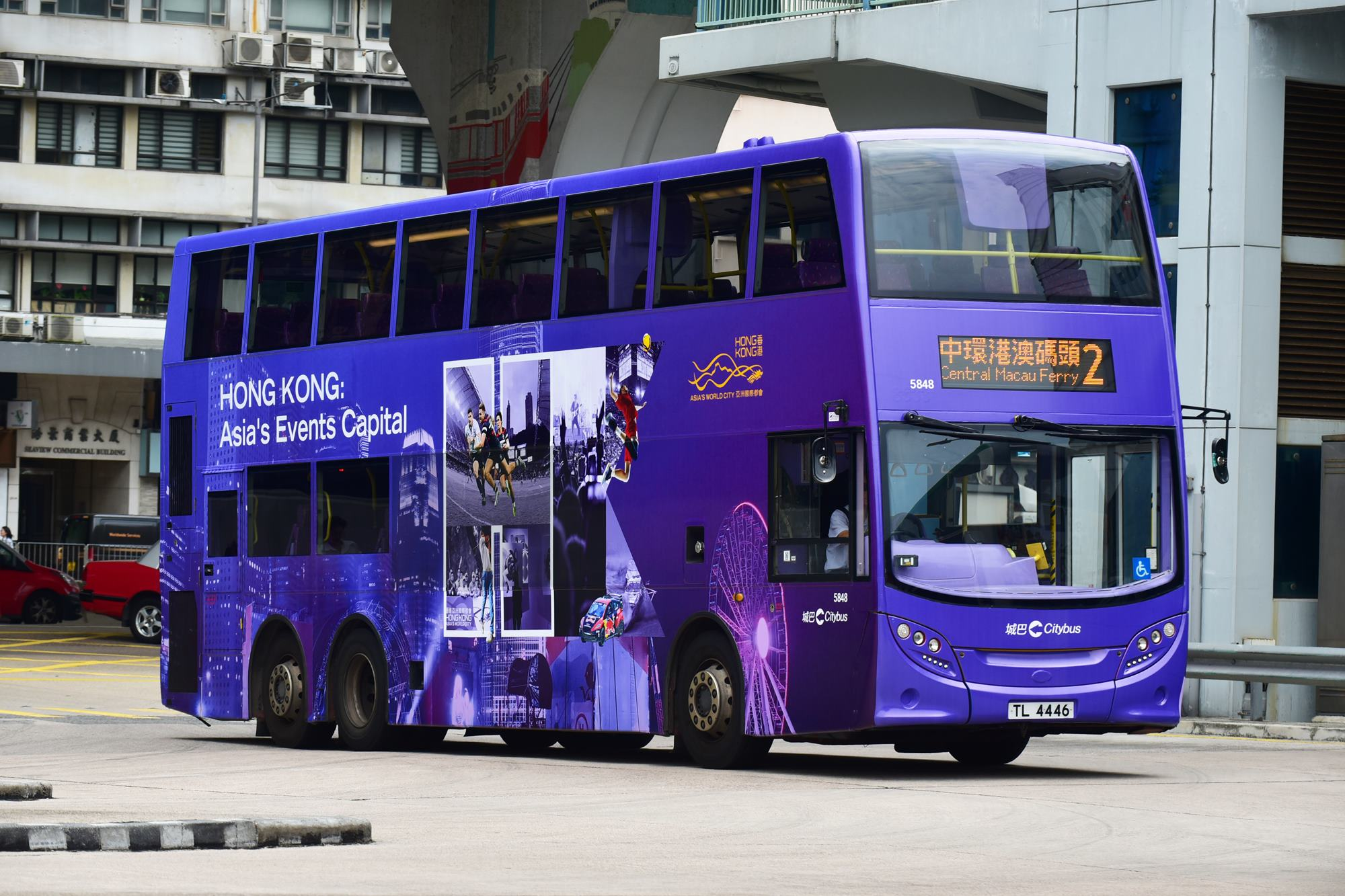
Branding on the exterior of a bus

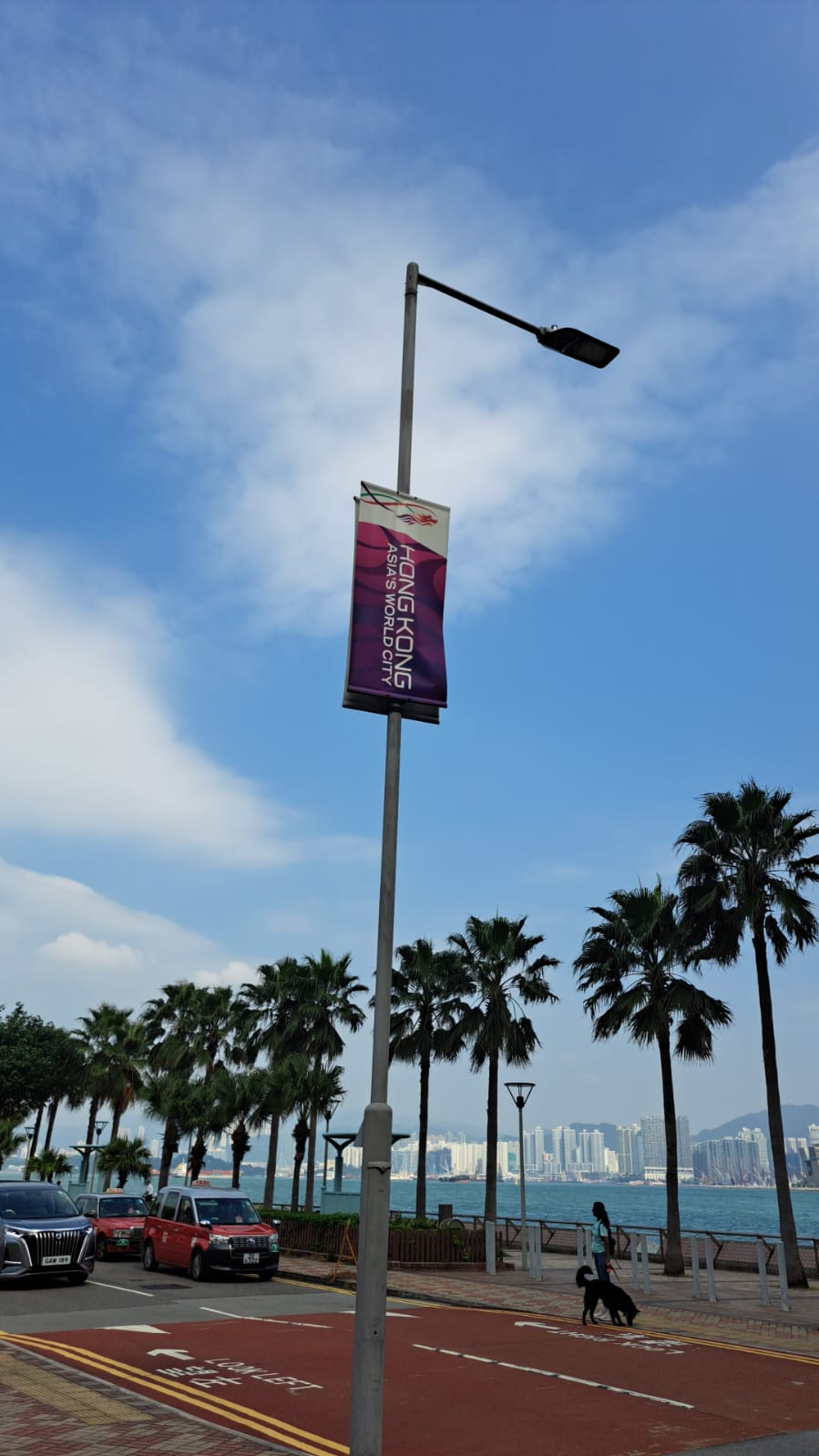
Promotional banners on the streets

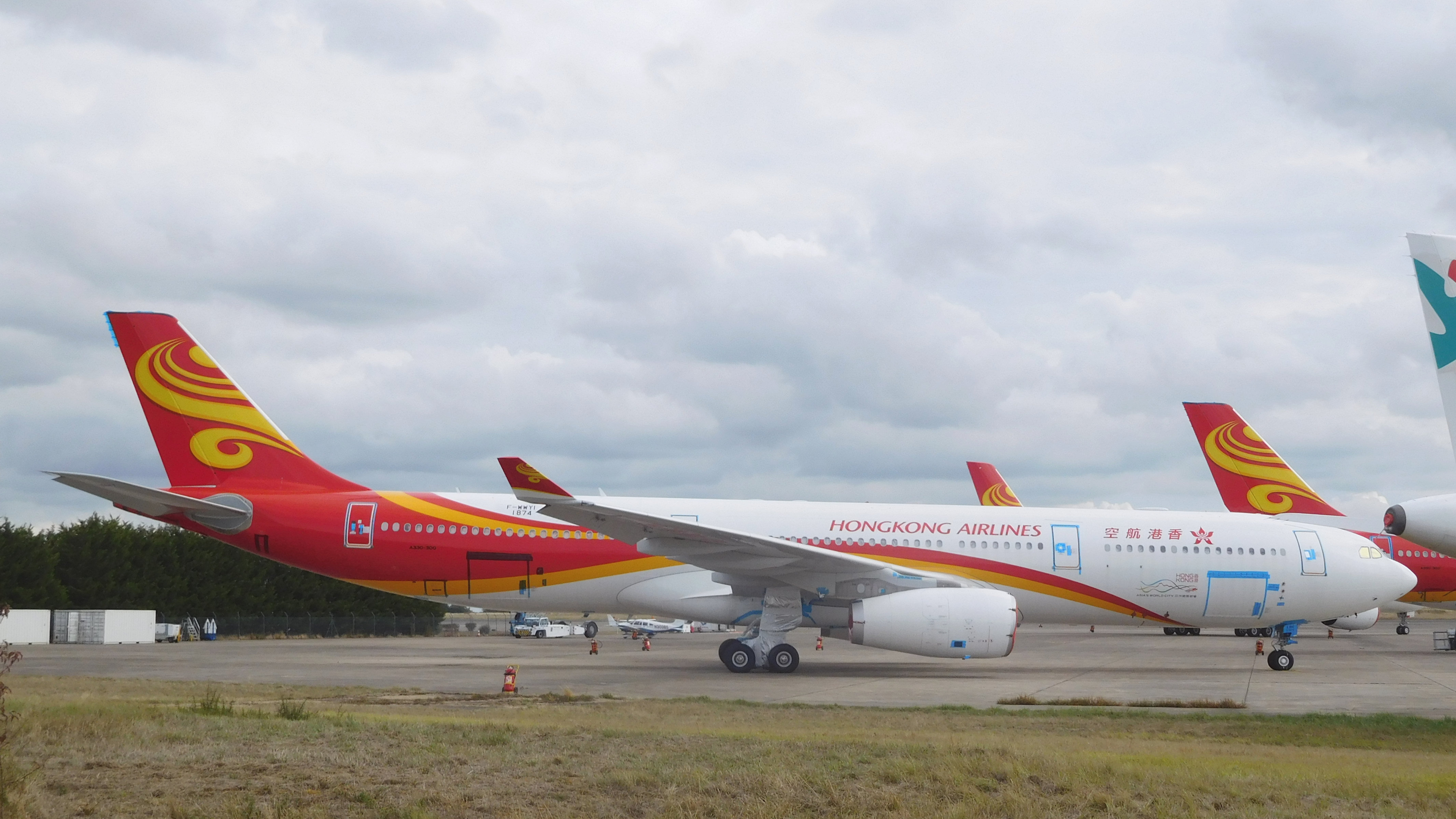
BrandHK printed on a Hong Kong Airlines Airbus A330

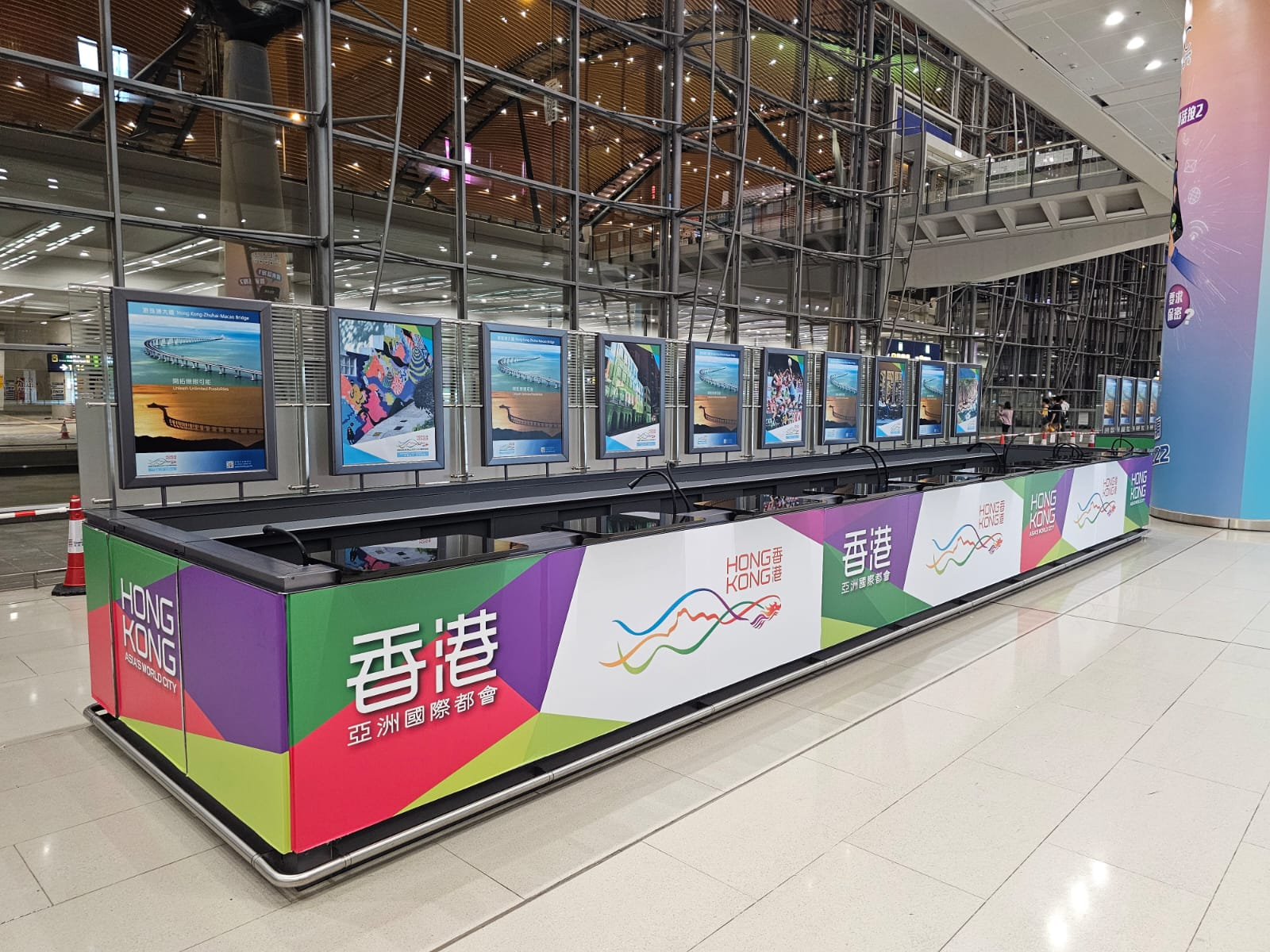
Branding on the service counters at Hong Kong International Airport

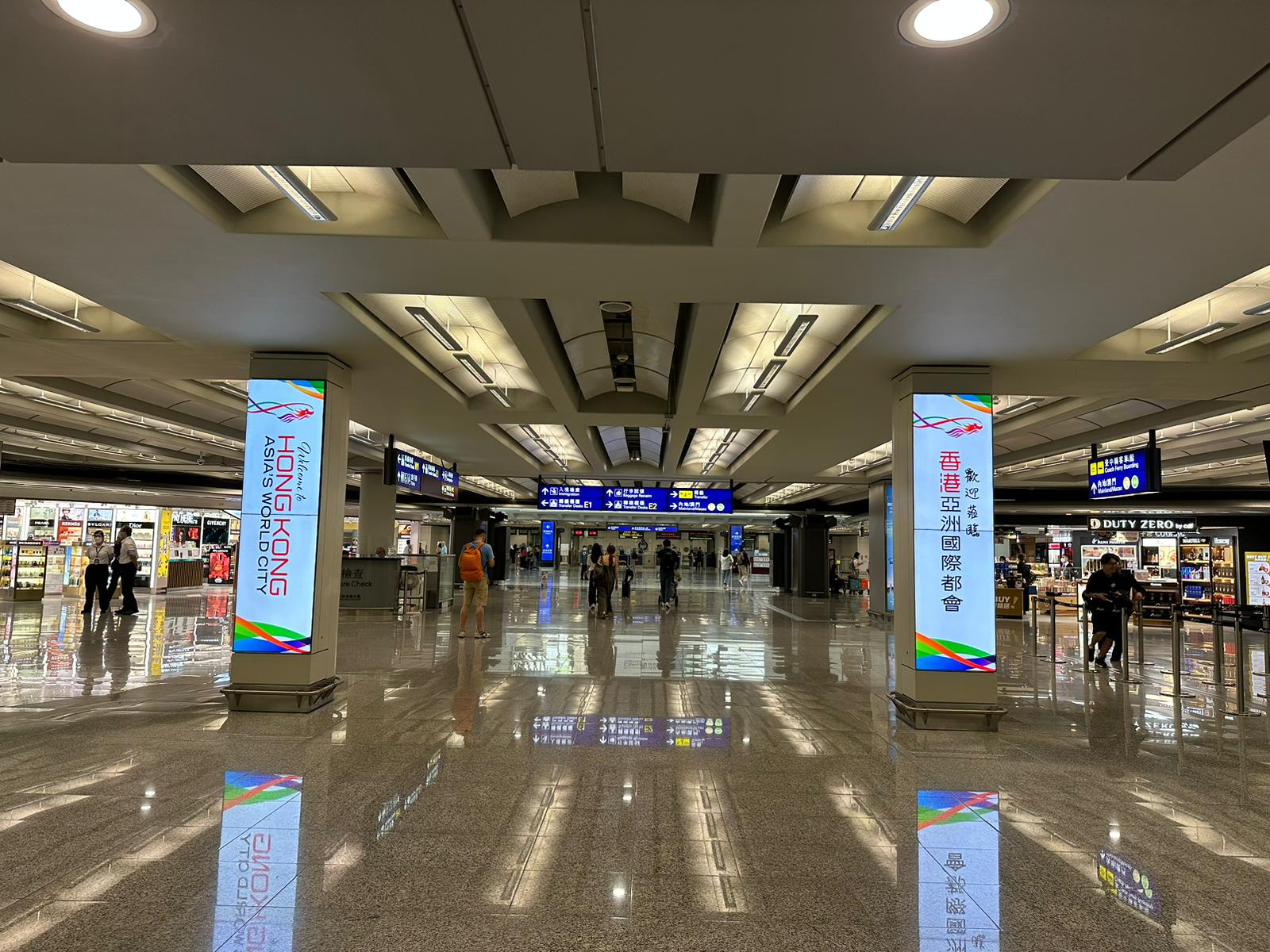
Branding on the LED lightbox at Hong Kong International Airport restricted area

== Visual design ==
The original image design incorporated the Chinese characters of Hong Kong (香港), as well as the city's initials "HK."

In 2010, following a government review, the dragon logo was updated, making the dragon head smaller and incorporating three streaks of ribbons behind the dragon's head. It also brought a more colourful design, referring to Hong Kong's "diversity and dynamism." The blue and green ribbons symbolise the blue sky and sustainable environment of Hong Kong, while the red ribbon symbolises Lion Rock, indicating the "can-do" spirit of the Hong Kong people.

== Criticism ==
=== Design ===
Upon unveiling of the new "ribbon" logo in 2010, there was criticism around the fees paid to the branding company and how they could not be justified by the limited updates to the logo. The article also included interview quotations from the designer of the previous brand image, who disliked the removal of the "HK" and "香港" characters from the dragon flames, suggesting that the change reduced the meaning of the brand.

=== Branding ===
Despite the government's promotions and attempts to build this image for the city, criticism has been raised throughout the years. Incidents such as racist acts to ethnics minorities from police, news about Hong Kong's low city competitiveness rankings and low liveability rankings, and the intense conflicts between Hong Kong people and the Chinese government has raised doubt to such branding to the city.

=== 2019-2020 Hong Kong protests ===
The protests drew international attention, highlighting issues related to democracy and human rights. This shifted the global narrative around Hong Kong from its status as a thriving financial hub to a city facing significant political unrest. The protests sparked a stronger sense of local identity among many residents, emphasizing civic engagement. However, this also led to divisions within the community and challenges in fostering a cohesive identity for BrandHK. However, the protests has significantly subsided in 2020, amidst the COVID-19 pandemic and new laws like the Hong Kong National Security Law that were enacted since then.
