= Dorabjee Naorojee Mithaiwala =

Indian businessman

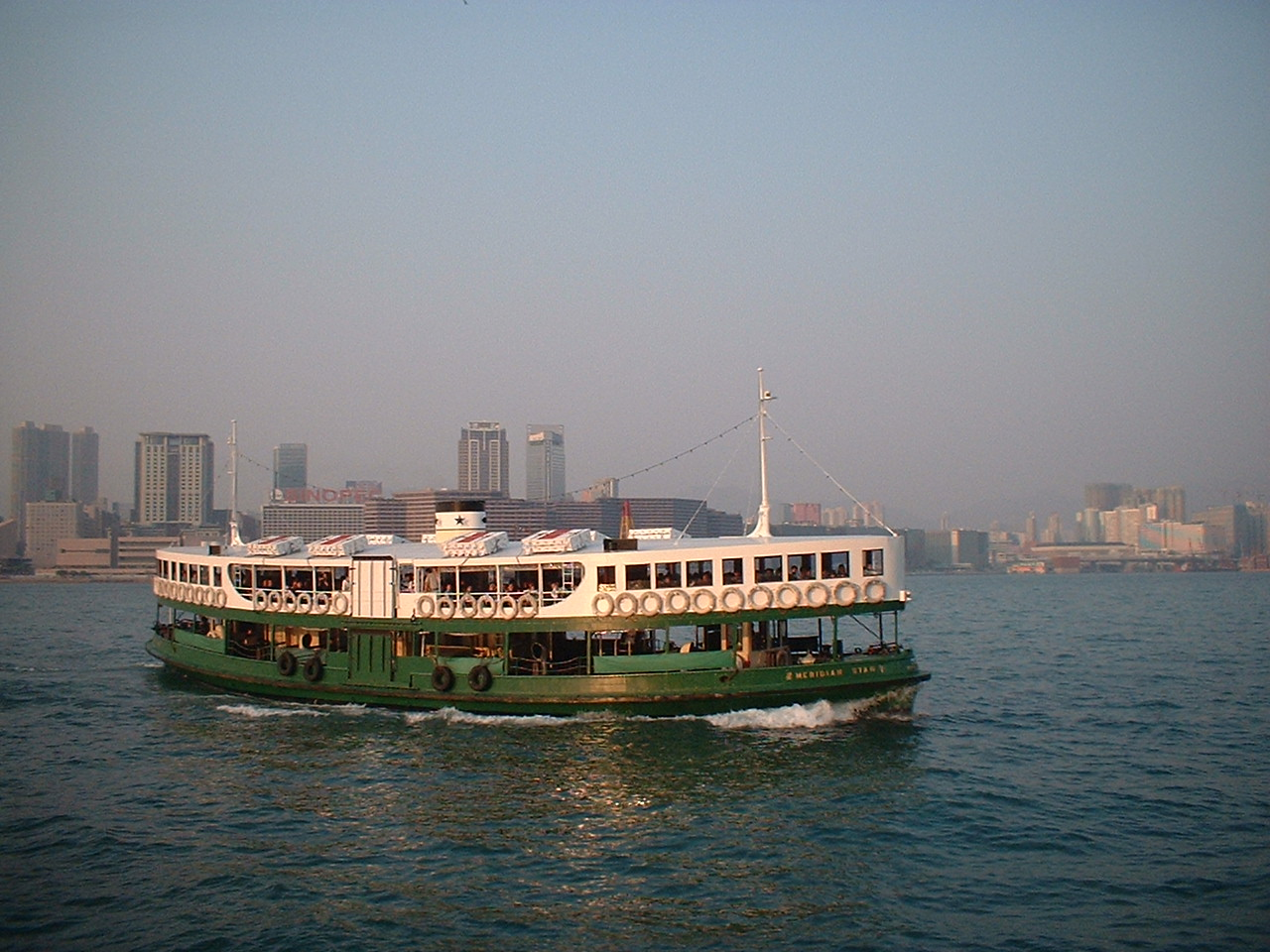
- The Star Ferry
- Died: Bombay, British India
- Occupation: Businessman
- Years active: 1852–1898
- Known for: Founding the Kowloon Ferry Company

Dorabjee Naorojee Mithaiwala (sometimes written 'Nowrojee') was a British businessman of Parsi descent in Hong Kong.

== Early years ==
He first arrived in Hong Kong in 1852 as a stowaway aboard a ship from Bombay bound for China and was a cook.

== Career ==
=== Founding of the Star Ferry ===
Naorojee is most recognized for the founding of the Kowloon Ferry Company in 1888 for transporting passengers and cargo (especially bread) between Kowloon and Hong Kong Island. The company was renamed in 1898 to Star Ferry, which today transports passengers throughout Hong Kong.

=== Hotel business ===
Dorabjee Naorojee was also a hotel entrepreneur, starting the King Edward Hotel in colonial Hong Kong. According to some sources, he leased the Hong Kong Hotel in 1873 for ten years and afterward started one hotel on Pottinger Street and two in Kowloon.

Other sources have a businessman by the name of Mr Hing Kee, who was tired of the hotel business and sold his landmark in 1903 to Mr Farmer, who was a veteran of the hotel business. Farmer had also worked in Australia before arriving in Hong Kong in 1890 to work at the Victoria Hotel, then the New Victoria Hotel, where he became the proprietor in 1898. His son Dhunjeebhoy Dorabjee Naorojee ran the hotel after his father returned to India and until his death in 1911. Supposedly around 1906 or 1907 Mr Madar, Dorabjee and Mr Farmer started the King Edward Hotel at 3 Des Voeux Road situated in Hong Kong Island. It is believed that this hotel used the name as a franchise lease, not the original nor the very first King Edward Hotel.

Mithaiwala retired from his businesses in Hong Kong and returned to India where he died at a later date.
