= Crossing the Bar =

1889 poem by Alfred, Lord Tennyson

"Crossing the Bar" is an 1889 elegiac poem by Alfred, Lord Tennyson. The narrator uses an extended metaphor to compare death with crossing the "sandbar" between the river of life, with its outgoing "flood", and the ocean that lies beyond death, the "boundless deep", to which we return.

== Overview ==
The background to the poem's composition is not entirely clear. One suggestion is that Tennyson composed it while crossing the Solent from Aldworth to Farringford on the Isle of Wight, after suffering a serious illness; alternatively, that he wrote it on a yacht anchored in Salcombe, where there is a moaning sandbar. "The words", he said, "came in a moment". Shortly before he died, Tennyson told his son Hallam to "put 'Crossing the Bar' at the end of all editions of my poems".

The poem contains four stanzas that generally alternate between long and short lines. Tennyson employs a traditional ABAB rhyme scheme. Scholars have noted that the form of the poem follows the content: the wavelike quality of the long-then-short lines parallels the narrative thread of the poem.

The extended metaphor of "crossing the bar" represents travelling serenely and securely from life into death. The Pilot is a metaphor for God, whom the speaker hopes to meet face to face. Tennyson explained, "The Pilot has been on board all the while, but in the dark I have not seen him…[He is] that Divine and Unseen Who is always guiding us."

== Musical arrangements ==
The words were set to music in April 1890 as a song for high voice and piano by Charles Villiers Stanford and as an 1893 hymn, "Freshwater", for four-part chorus by Sir Hubert Parry. Other settings include those by Sir Joseph Barnby, Geoffrey Shaw, Charles Ives, Gwyneth Van Anden Walker and John Philip Sousa.

In 1998 the poem was set to music by Rani Arbo, with a subsequent choral arrangement by Peter Amidon. A slightly rearranged version of the latter was later produced by The Spooky Men's Chorale and included on their album called Warm.

A version by the folk band Doggerland to Rani Arbo's music is available on their album No Sadness of Farewell, released in 2017, and it has also been covered by the folk band False Lights on their album Salvor, released in 2015. British folk music group The Longest Johns released their own cover of this poem in 2018 in their album Between Wind and Water. It has also been covered by Will Finn & Rosie Calvert in their 2018 album Beneath This Place.

A 2024 four-part arrangement by Craig McLeish was written for "Sing to Save Lives", a project celebrating the bicentenary of the RNLI.

== Text ==
Sunset and evening star,
And one clear call for me!
And may there be no moaning of the bar,
When I put out to sea,

But such a tide as moving seems asleep,
Too full for sound and foam,
When that which drew from out the boundless deep
Turns again home.

Twilight and evening bell,
And after that the dark!
And may there be no sadness of farewell,
When I embark;

For tho' from out our bourne of Time and Place
The flood may bear me far,
I hope to see my Pilot face to face
When I have crost the bar.
