= Georges Simenon bibliography =

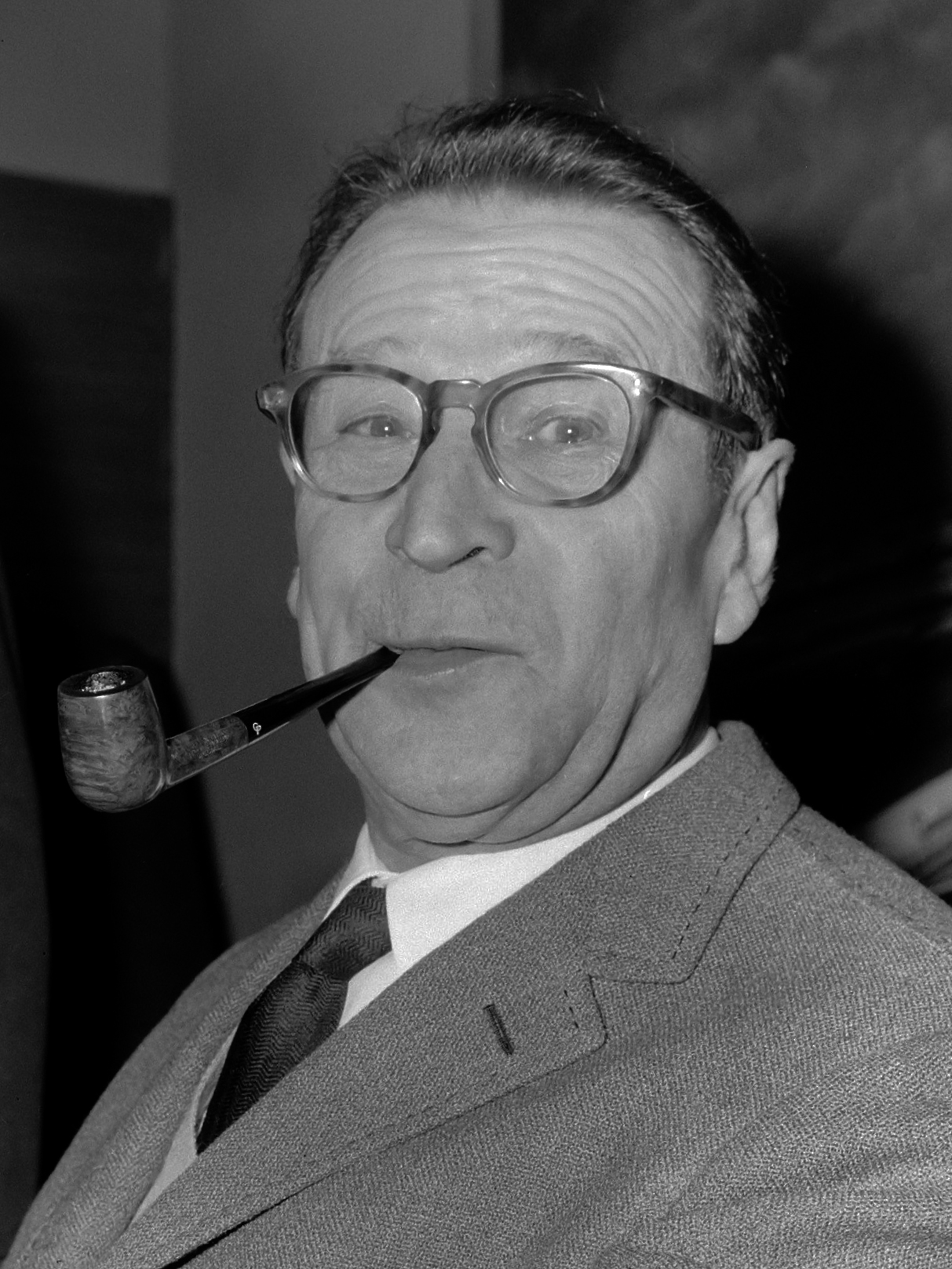
Georges Simenon in 1965

Georges Joseph Christian Simenon (French: [ʒɔʁʒ simnɔ̃]; 12/13 February 1903 – 4 September 1989) was a Belgian writer, most famous for his fictional detective Jules Maigret. He was one of the most popular authors of the 20th century, selling over 500 million copies of his works during his lifetime. Apart from his detective fiction, he achieved critical acclaim for his literary novels which he called romans durs (hard novels). Among his literary admirers were Max Jacob, François Mauriac and André Gide. Gide wrote, "I consider Simenon a great novelist, the greatest perhaps, and the most truly a novelist that we have had in contemporary French literature."

Simenon's published works include 192 novels written under his own name, over 200 novels written under various pseudonyms, four autobiographies and 21 volumes of memoirs. He also wrote a large quantity of short fiction.

== Classification ==
Simenon's fiction is often classified into his early pseudonymous popular novels, the last of which was written in 1933; his fiction featuring police commissioner Jules Maigret (75 novels and 28 short stories); and his 117 literary novels (romans durs). Simenon's short fiction is usually classified into his Maigret stories and other short fiction. Simenon also wrote travel stories which straddle the boundary between fiction and non-fiction. His non-fiction includes autobiographical writings, travel writing, essays, journalism and published lectures.

The following partial bibliography includes only those works which were first published under Simenon's own name. The works are listed in order of their first French publication in commercial editions. French title and year of first publication is given first, followed by English translations where applicable. The first English translations printed in book form in British and American commercial editions are listed, as are the first editions of subsequent translations, and English translations currently in print where known.

Unless otherwise specified, the sources for the French title and publication date are Bernard Alavoine, Trudee Young, Tout Simenon and Tout Maigret. The sources for the publication details of English translations are Trudee Young, Barry Forshaw, Patrick Marnham, Penguin UK and the individual works cited.

== Novels ==
=== Maigret series ===
| French title | Year of French publication | Selected English translations |
|---|---|---|
| Pietr-le-Letton | 1930 | The Strange Case of Peter the Lett. New York: Covici, Friede. 1933; The Case of Peter the Lett. Tr. Abbott, Anthony. London: Hurst and Blackett. 1933; Maigret and the Enigmatic Lett. Tr. Woodward, Daphne. Harmondsworth: Penguin. 1963.; Pietr the Latvian. Translated by Bellos, David. UK: Penguin Classics. 2013. ISBN 978-0-14-139273-8. |
| M. Gallet, décédé | 1931 | The Death of Monsieur Gallet. New York: Covici, Friede. 1932.; The Death of Monsieur Gallet. Tr. Abbott, Anthony. London: Hurst and Blackett. 1933.; Maigret Stonewalled. Tr. Marshall, Margaret. Harmondsworth: Penguin. 1963; The Late Monsieur Gallet. Translated by Bell, Anthea. UK: Penguin Classics. 2013. ISBN 978-0-14-139337-7. |
| Le pendu de St Pholien | 1931 | The Crime of Inspector Maigret. Tr. Anthony Abbot. London: Hurst and Blackett. 1933; New York. Covici, Friede.1933; Maigret and the Hundred Gibbets. Tr. White, Tony. Baltimore, Harmondsworth: Penguin. 1963; The Hanged Man of Saint-Pholien. Translated by Coverdale, Linda. UK: Penguin Classics. 2014. ISBN 978-0-14-139345-2. |
| Le charretier de La Providence | 1931 | The Crime at Lock 14. London: Hurst and Blackett. 1934; New York: Covici, Friede. 1934; Maigret Meets a Milord. Tr. Baldick, Robert. Baltimore, Harmondsworth: Penguin. 1963; Lock 14. Tr. Baldick, Robert. UK: Penguin. 2003; The Carter of 'La Providence'. Translated by Coward, David. UK: Penguin Classics. 2014. ISBN 978-0-14-139346-9. |
| Le chien jaune | 1931 | A Face for a Clue. Tr. Sainsbury, Geoffrey. London: George Routledge & Sons. 1939.; New York: Harcourt, Brace, & Co. 1940; Maigret and the Yellow Dog. Tr. Linda Asher. New York: Harcourt Brace Jovanovich. 1987; The Yellow Dog. Translated by Asher, Linda. Penguin Classics. 2014. ISBN 978-0-14-139347-6. |
| La nuit du carrefour | 1931 | The Crossroad Murders. Tr. Abbott, Anthony. London. Hurst and Blackett. 1933; New York: Covici, Friede. 1933.; Maigret at the Crossroads. Tr. Baldick, Robert. Harmondsworth: Penguin. 1963.; Night at the Crossroads. Translated by Coverdale, Linda. UK: Penguin Classics. 2014. ISBN 978-0-14-139348-3. |
| Un crime en Hollande | 1931 | A Crime in Holland. Tr. Sainsbury, Geoffrey. London: George Routledge & Sons. 1940.; New York: Harcourt, Brace & Co. 1950.; A Crime in Holland. Translated by Reynolds, Siân. UK: Penguin Classics. 2014. ISBN 978-0-14-139349-0. |
| Au Rendez-vous des Terre-Neuvas | 1931 | The Sailors' Rendezvous. Trs. Margaret Ludwig. London: George Routledge & Son. 1940.; New York: Harcourt, Brace & Co. 1941.; The Grand Banks Café. Translated by Coward, David. UK: Penguin Classics. 2014. ISBN 978-0-14-139350-6. |
| La tête d'un homme | 1931 | A Battle of Nerves. Tr. Sainsbury, Geoffrey. London: George Routledge & Sons. 1939; New York: Harcourt, Brace & Co. 1940; A Man's Head. Translated by Coward, David. UK: Penguin Classics. 2014. ISBN 978-0-14-139351-3. |
| La danseuse du Gai-Moulin | 1931 | At the "Gai-Moulin". Trs. Sainsbury, Geoffrey. London: George Routledge & Sons. 1940.; New York: Harcourt, Brace & Co. 1940.; The Dancer at the Gai-Moulin. Translated by Reynolds, Siân. UK: Penguin Classics. 2014. ISBN 978-0-14-139352-0. |
| La guinguette à deux sous | 1932 | The Guinguette by the Seine. Tr. Sainsbury, Geoffrey. London: George Routledge & Sons. 1940.; New York: Harcourt, Brace & Co. 1940; The Bar on the Seine. Tr. David Watson. UK: Penguin Classics. 2003; The Two-Penny Bar. Translated by Watson, David. UK: Penguin Classics. 2014. ISBN 978-0-14-139417-6. |
| L'ombre chinoise | 1932 | The Shadow in the Courtyard. Tr. (anon.) London. Hurst and Blackett. 1934.; New York: Covici, Friede. 1934.; Maigret Mystified. Tr. Stewart, Jean. Harmondsworth: Penguin. 1964.; The Shadow Puppet. Translated by Schwarz, Ros. UK: Penguin Classics. 2014. ISBN 978-0-14-139418-3. |
| L'affaire Saint-Fiacre | 1932 | The Saint-Fiacre Affair. Tr. Margaret Ludwig. London: George Routledge & Sons. 1940; New York: Harcourt, Brace & Co. 1941.; Maigret Goes Home. Tr. Baldick, Robert. Harmondsworth: Penguin. 1967.; The Saint-Fiacre Affair. Translated by Whiteside, Shaun. UK: Penguin classics. 2014. ISBN 978-0-14-139475-6. |
| Chez les Flamands | 1932 | The Flemish Shop. Tr. Sainsbury, Geoffrey. London: George Routledge & Sons. 1940.; New York: Harcourt, Brace & Co. 1940.; The Flemish House. Translated by Whiteside, Shaun. UK: Penguin classics. 2014. ISBN 978-0-14-139477-0. |
| Le fou de Bergerac | 1932 | The Madman of Bergerac. Tr. Sainsbury, Geoffrey. London: George Routledge & Sons. 1940.; New York: Harcourt, Brace & Co. 1940.; The Madman of Bergerac. Translated by Schwarz, Ros. UK: Penguin Classics. 2015. ISBN 978-0-14-139456-5. |
| Le port des brumes | 1932 | Death of a Harbour Master. Tr. Gilbert, Stuart. London: George Routledge & Sons. 1941.; Death of a Harbor Master. Tr. Gilbert, Stuart. New York: Harcourt, Brace & Co. 1941.; The Misty Harbour. Translated by Coverdale, Linda. UK: Penguin Classics. 2015. ISBN 978-0-14-139479-4. |
| Liberty Bar | 1932 | Liberty Bar. Tr. Sainsbury, Geoffrey. London: George Routledge & Sons. 1940.; New York: Harcourt, Brace & Co. 1940.; Maigret on the Riviera. Tr. Sainsbury, Geoffrey. San Diego: Harcourt Brace Jovanovich. 1988.; Liberty Bar. Translated by Watson, David. UK: Penguin Classics. 2015. ISBN 978-0-14-139609-5. |
| L'ecluse n° 1 | 1933 | The Lock at Charenton. Tr. Margaret Ludwig. London: George Routledge & Sons. 1941; New York: Harcourt, Brace & Co. 1941.; Lock No. 1. Translated by Coward, David. UK: Penguin Classics. 2015. ISBN 978-0-14-139610-1. |
| Maigret | 1934 | Maigret Returns. Tr. Margaret Ludwig. London: George Routledge & Sons. 1941; New York: Harcourt, Brace & Co. 1941.; Maigret. Translated by Schwarz, Ros. UK: Penguin Classics. 2015. ISBN 978-0-14-139704-7. |
| Cécile est morte | 1942 | Maigret and the Spinster. Tr. Ellenbogen, Eileen. London: Hamish Hamilton. 1977.; Cécile is Dead. Translated by Bell, Anthea. UK: Penguin Classics. 2015. ISBN 978-0-14-139705-4. |
| Les caves du Majestic | 1942 | Maigret and the Hotel Majestic. Tr. Caroline Hillier. London: Hamish Hamilton. 1977.; The Cellars of the Majestic. Translated by Curtis, Howard. UK: Penguin Classics. 2015. ISBN 978-0-241-18844-6. |
| La maison du juge | 1942 | Maigret in Exile. Tr. Ellenbogen, Eileen. Hamish Hamilton. London. 1978.; The Judge's House. Translated by Curtis, Howard. UK: Penguin Classics. 2015. ISBN 978-0-241-18845-3. |
| Signé Picpus | 1944 | To Any Lengths. Tr. Sainsbury, Geoffrey. London: Routledge & Kegan Paul. 1950.; Signed Picpus. Translated by Coward, David. UK: Penguin Classics. 2015. ISBN 978-0-241-18846-0. |
| L'inspecteur Cadavre | 1944 | Maigret's Rival. Tr. Helen Thomson. London: Hamish Hamilton.1979.; Inspector Cadaver. Translated by Hobson, William. UK: Penguin Classics. 2015. ISBN 978-0-241-18847-7. |
| Félicie est là | 1944 | Maigret and the Toy Village. Tr. Ellenbogen, Eileen. London: Hamish Hamilton. 1978.; Félicie. Translated by Coward, David. UK: Penguin Classics. 2015. ISBN 978-0-241-18866-8. |
| Maigret se fâche | 1944 | Maigret in Retirement. Tr. Stewart, Jean. New York: Harcourt Brace Jovanovich. New York. 1976.; Maigret Gets Angry. Translated by Schwarz, Ros. UK: Penguin Classics. 2015. ISBN 978-0-14-139732-0. |
| Maigret à New York | 1947 | Maigret in New York's Underworld. Tr. Foulke, Adrienne. Garden City, N.Y.: Doubleday. 1950.; Maigret in New York. Translated by Coverdale, Linda. UK: Penguin Classics. 2016. ISBN 978-0-241-20636-2. |
| Les vacances de Maigret | 1948 | Maigret on Holiday. Tr. Sainsbury, Geoffrey. London: Routledge & Kegan Paul. 1950.; No Vacation for Maigret. Tr. Sainsbury, Geoffrey. Garden City, N.Y.: Doubleday. 1953.; Maigret's Holiday. Translated by Schwarz, Ros. UK: Penguin Classics. 2016. ISBN 978-0-14-198074-4. |
| Maigret et son mort | 1948 | Maigret's Special Murder. Tr. Stewart, Jean. London: Hamish Hamilton. 1964.; Maigret's Dead Man. Tr. Stewart, Jean. Garden City, N.Y.: Doubleday. 1964.; Maigret's Dead Man. Translated by Coward, David. UK: Penguin Classics. 2016. ISBN 978-0-241-20637-9. |
| La première enquête de Maigret | 1949 | Maigret's First Case. Tr. Brain, Robert. London: Hamish Hamilton. 1958.; Maigret's First Case. Translated by Schwarz, Ros. UK: Penguin Classics. 2016. ISBN 978-0-241-20638-6. |
| Mon ami Maigret | 1949 | My Friend Maigret. Tr. Ryan, Nigel. London: Hamish Hamilton. 1956.; The Methods of Maigret. Tr. Ryan, Nigel. Garden City, N.Y.: Doubleday. 1957.; My Friend Maigret. Translated by Whiteside, Shaun. UK: Penguin Classics. 2016. ISBN 978-0-241-20639-3. |
| Maigret chez le coroner | 1949 | Maigret and the Coroner. Tr. Frances Keene. London: Hamish Hamilton. 1980.; Maigret at the Coroner's. Translated by Coverdale, Linda. UK: Penguin Classics. 2016. ISBN 978-0-241-20681-2. |
| Maigret et la vieille Dame | 1950 | Maigret and the Old Lady. Tr. Brain, Robert. London: Hamish Hamilton. 1958.; Maigret and the Old Lady. Translated by Schwarz, Ros. UK: Penguin Classics. 2016. ISBN 978-0-241-20682-9. |
| L'amie de Mme Maigret | 1950 | Madame Maigret's Own Case. Tr. Sebba, Helen. Garden City, N.Y.: Doubleday. 1959.; Madame Maigret's Friend. Tr. Sebba, Helen. London: Hamish Hamilton. 1960.; Madame Maigret's Friend. Translated by Curtis, Howard. UK: Penguin Classics. 2016. ISBN 978-0-241-24016-8. |
| Les mémoires de Maigret | 1951 | Maigret's Memoirs. Tr. Stewart, Jean. London: Hamish Hamilton. 1963; Maigret's Memoirs. Translated by Curtis, Howard. UK: Penguin Classics. 2016. ISBN 978-0-241-24017-5. |
| Maigret au Picratt's | 1951 | Maigret in Montmartre. Tr. Woodward, Daphne. London: Hamish Hamilton. 1954.; Inspector Maigret and the Strangled Stripper. Tr. Schaeffer, Cornelia. Garden City, N.Y.: Doubleday. 1954.; Maigret at Picratt's. Translated by Hobson, William. UK: Penguin Classics. 2016. ISBN 978-0-241-24028-1. |
| Maigret en meublé | 1951 | Maigret Takes a Room. Tr. Brain, Robert. London: Hamish Hamilton. 1960.; Maigret Rents a Room. Tr. Brain, Robert. Garden City, N.Y.: Doubleday. 1961.; Maigret Takes a Room. Translated by Whiteside, Shaun. UK: Penguin Classics. 2016. ISBN 978-0-241-20684-3. |
| Maigret et la Grande Perche | 1951 | Maigret and the Burglar's Wife. Tr. J. Maclaren-Ross. London: Hamish Hamilton. 1955.; Inspector Maigret and the Burglar's Wife. Tr. J. Maclaren-Ross. Garden City, N.Y.: Doubleday. 1956.; Maigret and the Tall Woman. Translated by Watson, David. UK: Penguin Classics. 2016. ISBN 978-0-241-27738-6. |
| Maigret, Longon et les gangsters | 1951 | Maigret and the Gangsters. Tr. Varèse, Louise. London: Hamish Hamilton. 1974.; Inspector Maigret and the Killers. Tr. Varèse, Louise. Garden City, N. Y.: Doubleday. 1954.; Maigret, Lognon and the Gangsters. Translated by Hobson, William. UK: Penguin Classics. 2017. ISBN 978-0-241-25066-2. |
| Le revolver de Maigret | 1952 | Maigret's Revolver. Tr. Ryan, Nigel. London: Hamish Hamilton. 1956.; Maigret's Revolver. Translated by Reynolds, Siân. UK: Penguin Classics. 2017. ISBN 978-0-241-27743-0. |
| Maigret et l'homme du banc | 1953 | Maigret and the Man on the Boulevard. Tr. Ellenbogen, Eileen. London: Hamish Hamilton. 1975.; Maigret and the Man on the Bench. Translated by Watson, David. UK: Penguin Classics. 2017. ISBN 978-0-241-27744-7. |
| Maigret a peur | 1953 | Maigret Afraid. Tr. Margaret Duff. London: Hamish Hamilton. 1961.; Maigret is Afraid. Translated by Schwarz, Ros. UK: Penguin Classics. 2017. ISBN 978-0-241-20682-9. |
| Maigret se trompe | 1953 | Maigret's Mistake. Tr. Alan Hodge. London: Hamish Hamilton. 1954.; Maigret's Mistake. Translated by Curtis, Howard. UK: Penguin Classics. 2017. ISBN 978-0-241-27984-7. |
| Maigret à l'ecole | 1954 | Maigret Goes to School. Tr. Woodward, Daphne. London: Hamish Hamilton. 1957.; Maigret Goes to School. Translated by Coverdale, Linda. UK: Penguin Classics. 2017. ISBN 978-0-241-29757-5. |
| Maigret et la jeune morte | 1954 | Maigret and the Young Girl. Tr. Woodward, Daphne. London: Hamish Hamilton. 1955.; Inspector Maigret and the Dead Girl. Tr. Woodward, Daphne. Garden City, N.Y.: Doubleday. 1955.; Maigret and the Dead Girl. Translated by Curtis, Howard. UK: Penguin Classics. 2017. ISBN 978-0-241-29725-4. |
| Maigret chez le ministre | 1955 | Maigret and the Minister. Tr. Budberg, Moura. London: Hamish Hamilton. 1969.; Maigret and the Calame Report. Tr. Budberg, Moura. New York: Harcourt Brace & World. 1969.; Maigret and the Minister. Translated by Schwarz, Ros. UK: Penguin Classics. 2017. ISBN 978-0-241-27985-4. |
| Maigret et le corps sans tête | 1955 | Maigret and the Headless Corps. Tr. Ellenbogen, Eileen. London. Hamish Hamilton. 1967.; Maigret and the Headless Corps. Tr. Ellenbogen, Eileen. New York: Harcourt Brace & World. 1968.; Maigret and the Headless Corps. Translated by Curtis, Howard. UK: Penguin Classics. 2017. ISBN 978-0-241-29726-1. |
| Maigret tend un piège | 1955 | Maigret Sets a Trap. Tr. Woodward, Daphne. London: Hamish Hamilton. 1965.; Maigret Sets a Trap. Tr. Woodward, Daphne. New York: Harcourt Brace & World. 1972.; Maigret Sets a Trap. Translated by Reynolds, Siân. UK: Penguin Classics. 2017. ISBN 978-0-241-29764-3. |
| Un échec de Maigret | 1956 | Maigret's Failure. Tr. Woodward, Daphne. London: Hamish Hamilton. 1962.; Maigret's Failure. Translated by Hobson, William. UK: Penguin Classics. 2017. ISBN 978-0-241-30378-8. |
| Maigret s'amuse | 1957 | Maigret's Little Joke. Tr. Brain, Richard. London: Hamish Hamilton. 1957.; None of Maigret's Business. Tr. Brain, Richard. Garden City, N.Y.: Doubleday. 1958.; Maigret Enjoys Himself. Translated by Watson, David. UK: Penguin Classics. 2017. ISBN 978-0-14-198587-9. |
| Maigret voyage | 1957 | Maigret and the Millionaires. Tr. Stewart, Jean. London: Hamish Hamilton. 1974.; Maigret and the Millionaires. Tr. Stewart, Jean. New York: Harcourt Brace Jovanovich. 1974; Maigret Travels. Translated by Curtis, Howard. UK: Penguin Classics. 2018. ISBN 978-0-241-30382-5. |
| Les scrupules de Maigret | 1958 | Maigret Has Scruples. Tr. Eglesfield, Robert. London: Hamish Hamilton. 1959.; Maigret's Doubts. Translated by Whiteside, Shaun. UK: Penguin Classics. 2018. ISBN 978-0-14-198589-3. |
| Maigret et les temoins récalcitrants | 1959 | Maigret and the Reluctant Witnesses. Tr. Woodward, Daphne. London: Hamish Hamilton. 1959.; Maigret and the Reluctant Witnesses. Translated by Hobson, William. UK: Penguin Classics. 2018. ISBN 978-0-241-30385-6. |
| Une confidence de Maigret | 1959 | Maigret has Doubts. Tr. Moir, Lyn. London: Hamish Hamilton. 1968.; Maigret's Secret. Translated by Watson, David. UK: Penguin Classics. 2018. ISBN 978-0-241-30387-0. |
| Maigret aux assises | 1960 | Maigret in Court. Tr. Brain, Robert. London: Hamish Hamilton. 1961.; Maigret in Court. Translated by Schwarz, Ros. UK: Penguin Classics. 2018. ISBN 978-0-14-198591-6. |
| Maigret et les vieillards | 1960 | Maigret in Society. Tr. Eglesfield, Robert. London: Hamish Hamilton. 1962.; Maigret and the Old People. Translated by Whiteside, Shaun. UK: Penguin Classics. 2018. ISBN 978-0-241-30389-4. |
| Maigret et le voleur paresseux | 1961 | Maigret and the Lazy Burglar. Tr. Woodward, Daphne. London: Hamish Hamilton. 1963.; Maigret and the Lazy Burglar. Translated by Curtis, Howard. Penguin Classics. 2018. ISBN 978-0-241-30391-7. |
| Maigret et les braves gens | 1962 | Maigret and the Black Sheep. Tr. Helen Thomson. London: Hamish Hamilton 1976.; Maigret and the Black Sheep. Tr. Helen Thomson. New York: Harcourt Brace Jovanovich. 1976.; Maigret and the Good People of Montparnasse. Translated by Schwartz, Ros. Penguin Classics. 2018. ISBN 978-0-241-30393-1. |
| Maigret et le client du Samedi | 1962 | Maigret and the Saturday Caller. Tr. White, Tony. London: Hamish Hamilton. 1964.; Maigret and the Saturday Caller. Translated by Reynolds, Siân. UK: Penguin Classics. 2018. ISBN 978-0-241-30395-5. |
| Maigret et le clochard | 1963 | Maigret and the Dosser. Tr. Stewart, Jean. London: Hamish Hamilton. 1973; Maigret and the Bum. Tr. Stewart, Jean. New York: Harcourt Brace Jovanovich. 1973; Maigret and the Tramp. Translated by Curtis, Howard. UK: Penguin Classics. 2018. ISBN 978-0-241-30399-3. |
| La colère de Maigret | 1963 | Maigret Loses His Temper. Tr. Eglesfield, Robert. London: Hamish Hamilton. 1965.; Maigret's Anger. Translated by Hobson, William. UK: Penguin Classics. 2018. ISBN 978-0-241-30401-3. |
| Maigret et le fantôme | 1964 | Maigret and the Ghost. Tr. Ellenbogen, Eileen. London: Hamish Hamilton. 1976.; Maigret and the Ghost. Translated by Schwartz, Ros. UK: Penguin Classics. 2018. ISBN 978-0-241-30403-7. |
| Maigret se defend | 1964 | Maigret on the Defensive. Tr. Hamilton, Alastair. London: Hamish Hamilton. 1966.; Maigret Defends Himself. Translated by Curtis, Howard. UK: Penguin Classics. 2019. ISBN 978-0-241-30406-8. |
| La patience de Maigret | 1965 | The Patience of Maigret. Tr. Hamilton, Alastair. London: Hamish Hamilton. 1966.; Maigret's Patience. Translated by Watson, David. UK: Penguin Classics. 2019. ISBN 978-0-241-30413-6. |
| Maigret et l'affaire Nahour | 1966 | Maigret and the Nahour Case. Tr. Hamilton, Alastair. London: Hamish Hamilton. 1967.; Maigret and the Nahour Case. Translated by Hobson, William. UK: Penguin Classics. 2019. ISBN 978-0-241-30415-0. |
| Le voleur de Maigret | 1967 | Maigret's Pickpocket. Tr. Ryan, Nigel. London: Hamish Hamilton. 1968.; Maigret's Pickpocket. Tr. Ryan, Nigel. New York: Harcourt Brace Jovanovich. 1968.; Maigret and the Pickpocket. Translated by Reynolds, Siân. UK: Penguin Classics. 2019. ISBN 978-0-241-30417-4. |
| Maigret à Vichy | 1968 | Maigret Takes the Waters. Tr. Ellenbogen, Eileen. London: Hamish Hamilton. 1969.; Maigret in Vichy. Tr. Ellenbogen, Eileen. New York: Harcourt Brace Jovanovich. 1969.; Maigret in Vichy. Translated by Schwartz, Ros. UK: Penguin Classics. 2018. ISBN 978-0-241-30421-1. |
| Maigret hésite | 1968 | Maigret Hesitates. Tr. Moir, Lyn. London: Hamish Hamilton. 1970.; Maigret Hesitates. Tr. Moir, Lyn. New York: Harcourt Brace Jovanovich. 1970.; Maigret Hesitates. Translated by Curtis, Howard. UK: Penguin Classics. 2019. ISBN 978-0-241-30419-8. |
| L'ami d'enfance de Maigret | 1968 | Maigret's Boyhood Friend. Tr. Ellenbogen, Eileen. London: Hamish Hamilton. 1970.; Maigret's Boyhood Friend. Tr. Ellenbogen, Eileen. New York: Harcourt Brace Jovanovich. 1970.; Maigret's Childhood Friend. Translated by Whiteside, Shaun. UK: Penguin Classics. 2019. ISBN 978-0-241-30423-5. |
| Maigret et le tueur | 1969 | Maigret and the Killer. Tr. Moir, Lyn. London: Hamish Hamilton. 1971.; Maigret and the Killer. Tr. Moir, Lyn. New York: Harcourt Brace Jovanovich. 1971.; Maigret and the Killer. Translated by Whiteside, Shaun. UK: Penguin Classics. 2019. ISBN 978-0-241-30426-6. |
| Maigret et le marchand de vin | 1970 | Maigret and the Wine Merchant. Tr. Ellenbogen, Eileen. London: Hamish Hamilton. 1971.; Maigret and the Wine Merchant. Tr. Ellenbogen, Eileen. New York: Harcourt Brace Jovanovich. 1971.; Maigret and the Wine Merchant. Translated by Schwartz, Ros. UK: Penguin Classics. 2019. ISBN 978-0-241-30428-0. |
| La folle de Maigret | 1970 | Maigret and the Madwoman. Tr. Ellenbogen, Eileen. London: Hamish Hamilton. 1972.; Maigret and the Madwoman. Tr. Ellenbogen, Eileen. New York: Harcourt Brace Jovanovich. 1972.; Maigret's Madwoman. Translated by Reynolds, Siân. UK: Penguin Classics. 2019. ISBN 978-0-241-30430-3. |
| Maigret et l'homme tout seul | 1971 | Maigret and the Loner. Tr. Ellenbogen, Eileen. London: Hamish Hamilton. 1975.; Maigret and the Loner. Translated by Curtis, Howard. UK: Penguin Classics. 2019. ISBN 978-0-241-30434-1. |
| Maigret et l'indicateur | 1971 | Maigret and the Flea. Tr. Moir, Lyn. London: Hamish Hamilton: 1972.; Maigret and the Informer. Tr. Moir, Lyn. New York: Harcourt Brace Jovanovich. 1972.; Maigret and the Informer. Translated by Hobson, William. UK: Penguin Classics. 2019. ISBN 978-0-241-30436-5. |
| Maigret et M. Charles | 1972 | Maigret and Monsieur Charles. Tr. Sinclair, Marianne Alexandre. London: Hamish Hamilton. 1973.; Maigret and Monsieur Charles. Translated by Schwartz, Ros. UK: Penguin Classics. 2020. ISBN 978-0-241-30441-9. |

=== Romans durs ("hard novels") ===
| French title | Year of French publication | Selected English translations |
|---|---|---|
| Le relais d'Alsace | 1931 | The Man from Everywhere. Tr. Gilbert, Stuart. London: George Routledge & Sons. 1941. |
| Le passager du 'Polarlys' | 1932 | The Mystery of the 'Polarlys' . Tr. Gilbert, Stuart. London: George Routledge & Sons. 1942.; Danger at Sea. Tr. Victor Kosta. Garden City, N.Y.: Hanover House. 1954. |
| Les Fiançailles de M. Hire | 1933 | Mr Hire's Engagement. Tr. Woodward, Daphne. London: Hamish Hamilton. 1956.; The Engagement. Tr. Moschovakis, Anna. New York Review Books (NYRB) Classics. 2007; Monsieur Hire's Engagement. Translated by Moschovakis, Anna. UK: Penguin Classics. 2014. ISBN 978-0-14-197846-8. |
| Le coup de lune | 1933 | Tropic Moon. Tr. Gilbert, Stuart. London: George Routledge & Sons. 1942.; Tropic Moon. Tr. Gilbert, Stuart. New York: Harcourt Brace & Co. 1943.; Tropic Moon. Tr. Romano, Marc. New York: NYRB Classics. 2005. ISBN 1-59017-111-X |
| La maison du canal | 1933 | The House by the Canal. Tr. Sainsbury, Geoffrey. London: Routledge & Kegan Paul. 1952. |
| L'Âne rouge (1933). | 1933 | The Night Club. Tr. Stewart, Jean. London: Hamish Hamilton. 1979. |
| Les gens d’en face | 1933 | The Window Over the Way. Tr. Baldick, Robert. Harmondsworth: Penguin Books. 1966.; The People Opposite. Translated by Reynolds, Siân. Penguin Classics. 2022. ISBN 978-0-241-53472-4. |
| Le haut mal | 1933 | The Woman in the Grey House. Tr. Gilbert, Stuart. London: George Routledge & Sons. 1942.; The Woman in the Gray House. Tr. Gilbert, Stuart. New York: Harcourt Brace & Co. 1944. |
| L'homme de Londres | 1933 | Newhaven-Dieppe. Tr. Gilbert, Stuart. London: George Routledge & Sons. 1942.; Newhaven-Dieppe. Tr. Gilbert, Stuart. New York: Harcourt Brace & Co. 1944.; The Man from London. Translated by Curtis, Howard. Penguin Classics. 2021. ISBN 978-0-241-46157-0. |
| Le locataire | 1934 | The Lodger. Tr. Gilbert, Stuart. London: George Routledge & Sons. 1943.; The Lodger. Tr. Gilbert, Stuart. Harcourt Brace & Co. 1944. |
| Les suicidés | 1934 | One Way Out. Tr. Gilbert, Stuart. London: George Routledge & Sons. 1943.; One Way Out. Tr. Gilbert, Stuart. Harcourt Brace & Co. 1944. |
| Les Pitard | 1935 | A Wife at Sea. Tr. Sainsbury, Geoffrey. London: Routledge & Keegan Paul. 1949.; The Pitards. Translated by Bellos, David. UK: Penguin Classics. 2019. ISBN 978-0-241-32547-6. |
| Les clients d'Avrenos | 1935 | — |
| Quartier Nègre | 1935 | — |
| L'évadé | 1936 | The Disintegration of J.P.G. Tr. Sainsbury, Geoffrey. London: George Routledge & Sons. 1943. |
| Long cours | 1936 | The Long Exile. Translated by Ellenbogen, Eileen. US: Harcourt, Brace, Jovanovich. 1983. ISBN 978-0-15-152997-1. |
| Les demoiselles de Concarneau | 1936 | The Breton Sisters. Tr. Gilbert, Stuart. London: George Routledge & Sons. 1943.; The Breton Sisters. Tr. Gilbert, Stuart. New York: Harcourt Brace & Co. 1943. |
| 45° à l'ombre | 1936 | Aboard the Aquitaine. Trs. Auster, Paul, Lydia Davis. New York: Harcourt Brace Jovanovich. 1979. |
| Le testament Donadieu | 1937 | The Shadow Falls. Tr. Gilbert, Stuart. London: George Routledge & Sons. 1945.; The Shadow Falls. Tr. Gilbert, Stuart. New York: Harcourt Brace & Co. 1945. |
| L'assassin | 1937 | The Murderer. Tr. Sainsbury, Geoffrey. London: Routledge & Kegan Paul. 1947 |
| Les blanc à lunettes | 1937 | Talatala. Tr. Gilbert, Stuart. London: George Routledge & Sons. 1943.; Talatala. Tr. Gilbert, Stuart. New York: Harcourt Brace & Co. 1943. |
| Faubourg | 1937 | Home Town. Tr. Gilbert, Stuart. London: George Routledge & Sons. 1944.; Home Town. Tr. Gilbert, Stuart. New York: New York: Harcourt Brace & Co. 1944. |
| Ceux de la soif | 1938 | — |
| Chemin sans issue | 1938 | Blind Path. Tr. Gilbert, Stuart. London: George Routledge & Sons. 1946.; Blind Alley. Tr. Gilbert, Stuart. New York: Reynal & Hitchcock. 1946. |
| Les rescapés du Télémaque | 1938 | The Survivors. Tr. Sainsbury, Geoffrey. London: Routledge & Kegan Paul. 1949. |
| Les trois crimes de mes amis | 1938 | — |
| Le suspect | 1938 | The Green Thermos. Tr. Gilbert, Stuart. London: George Routledge & Sons. 1944.; The Green Thermos. Tr. Gilbert, Stuart. New York: Harcourt Brace & Co. 1944. |
| Les soeurs Lacroix | 1938 | Poisoned Relations. Tr. Sainsbury, Geoffrey. London: Routledge & Kegan Paul. 1950. |
| Touriste de bananes | 1938 | Banana Tourist. Tr. Gilbert, Stuart. London: George Routledge & Sons. 1946. |
| M. La souris | 1938 | Monsieur La Souris. Tr. Sainsbury, Geoffrey. London: Routledge & Kegan Paul. 1950. |
| La Marie du port | 1938 | Chit of a Girl. Tr. Sainsbury, Geoffrey. London: Routledge & Kegan Paul. 1949. |
| L'homme qui regardait passer les trains | 1938 | The Man Who Watched the Trains Go By. Tr. Gilbert, Stuart. Toronto: Musson. 1942.; The Man Who Watched the Trains Go By. Tr. Gilbert, Stuart. New York: Reynal & Hitchcock. 1946.; The Man Who Watched the Trains Go By. Tr. Romano, Marc. New York: NYRB Classics. 2005.; The Man Who Watched the Trains Go By. Translated by Reynolds, Siân. Penguin Classics. 2016. ISBN 978-0-241-25855-2. |
| Le cheval blanc | 1938 | The White Horse Inn. Tr. Denny, Norman. London: Hamish Hamilton. 1980. ISBN 978-0-241-10438-5. |
| Le coup de vague | 1939 | — |
| Chez Krull | 1939 | Chez Krull. Tr. Woodward, Daphne. London: Hamish Hamilton. 1955.; The Krull House. Translated by Curtis, Howard. Penguin Classics. 2020. ISBN 978-0-241-45341-4. |
| Le bourgmestre de Furnes | 1939 | The Bourgomaster of Furnes. Tr. Sainsbury, Geoffrey. London: Routledge & Kegan Paul. 1952. |
| Malempin | 1940 | The Family Lie. Tr. Quigley, Isabel. New York : Harcourt Brace Jovanovich. 1978. |
| Les inconnus dans la maison | 1940 | The Strangers in the House. Tr. Sainsbury, Geoffrey. NYRB Classics. 2006; The Strangers in the House. Translated by Curtis, Howard. Penguin Classics. 2021. ISBN 978-0-241-48709-9. |
| Cour de assises | 1941 | Justice. Tr. Sainsbury, Geoffrey. London: Routledge & Kegan Paul. 1949. |
| Bergelon | 1941 | The Country Doctor. Tr. Denny, Norman. London: Hamish Hamilton. 1980. ISBN 978-0-241-10438-5. |
| L'outlaw | 1941 | The Outlaw. Tr. Curtis, Howard, Hamish Hamilton (UK); Harcourt Brace Jovanovich (USA) 1986 |
| Il pleut, bergère | 1941 | Black Rain. Tr. Sainsbury, Geoffrey. New York: Reynal & Hitchcock. 1947.; Black Rain. Tr. Sainsbury, Geoffrey. London: Routledge & Kegan Paul. 1949. |
| Le voyageur de la Toussaint | 1941 | Strange Inheritance. Tr. Sainsbury, Geoffrey. London: Routledge & Kegan Paul. 1950. |
| La maison de sept jeunes filles | 1941 | — |
| Oncle Charles s'est enfermé | 1942 | Uncle Charles or Uncle Charles Has Locked himself In. Tr. Curtis, Howard, Hamish Hamilton (UK); Harcourt Brace Jovanovich (USA) 1988 |
| La veuve Couderc | 1942 | Ticket of Leave. Tr. Petrie, John. London: Routledge & Kegan Paul. 1954.; The Widow. Tr. Petrie, John. New York: Doubleday. 1955.; The Widow. Tr. Petrie, John. NYRB Classics. 2008.; The Widow Couderc. Translated by Reynolds, Siân. Penguin Classics. 2023. ISBN 978-0-241-53473-1. |
| Le fils Cardinaud | 1942 | Young Cardinaud. Tr. Brain, Richard. London: Hamish Hamilton. 1956. |
| La verité sur Bébé Donge | 1942 | The Trial of Bébé Donge. Tr. Sainsbury, Geoffrey. London: Routledge & Kegan Paul. 1952.; I Take this Woman. Tr. Varèse, Louise. New York: Prentice-Hall. 1953. |
| Le rapport du gendarme | 1944 | The Gendarme's Report. Tr. Sainsbury, Geoffrey. London: Routledge & Kegan Paul. 1951. |
| La fuite de M. Monde | 1945 | Monsieur Monde Vanishes. Tr. Stewart, Jean. London: Hamish Hamilton. 1967.; Monsieur Monde Vanishes. Tr. Stewart, Jean. New York: NYRB Classics. 2004. ISBN 1-59017-096-2 |
| La fenêtre des Rouets | 1945 | Across the Street. Tr. Petrie, John. London: Routledge & Kegan Paul. 1954. |
| L'ainé des Ferchaux | 1945 | Magnet of Doom. Tr. Sainsbury, Geoffrey. London: George Routledge & Sons. 1948.; The First Born. Tr. Sainsbury, Geoffrey. New York: Reynal & Hitchcock. 1949. |
| Trois chambres à Manhattan | 1946 | Three Beds in Manhattan. Tr. Blochman, Lawrence G.. Garden City, N. Y.: Doubleday. 1964.; Three Bedrooms in Manhattan. Tr. Romano, Marc and Blochman, Lawrence G.. New York: NYRB Classics. 2003.; Three Bedrooms in Manhattan. Translated by Romano, Marc; Blochman, Lawrence G. UK: Penguin Classics. 2020. ISBN 978-0-241-46156-3. |
| Les noces de Poitiers | 1946 | The Couple from Poitiers. Tr. Ellenbogen, Eileen. London: Hamish Hamilton. 1985. ISBN 978-0-241-11647-0 |
| Le Cercle des Mahé | 1946 | The Mahé Circle. Translated by Reynolds, Siân. UK: Penguin Classics. 2014. ISBN 978-0-14-139416-9. |
| Au bout du rouleau | 1947 | — |
| Lettre à mon juge | 1947 | Act of Passion. Tr. Varèse, Louise. New York: Prentice Hall. 1952; Act of Passion. Tr. Varèse, Louise. London: Routledge & Kegan Paul. 1953.; Act of Passion. Translated by Varèse, Louise. New York: NYBR Classics. 2011. ISBN 978-1-59017-385-5 |
| Le clan des Ostendais | 1947 | The Ostenders. Tr. Sainsbury, Geoffrey. London: Routledge & Kegan Paul. 1952. |
| Le passager clandestin | 1947 | The Stowaway. Tr. Ryan, Nigel. London: Hamish Hamilton. 1957. |
| Le bilan Malétras | 1948 | The Reckoning. Tr. Read, Emily. London: Hamish Hamilton. 1984. ISBN 978-0-241-11170-3 |
| Le destin des Malou | 1948 | The Fate of the Malous. Tr. George, Denis. London: Hamish Hamilton. 1962. |
| La jument perdue | 1948 | — |
| La neige était sale | 1948 | The Snow Was Black. Tr. Varèse, Louise. New York: Prentice-Hall. 1950.; The Stain on the Snow. Tr. Petrie, John. London: Routledge & Kegan Paul. 1953.; Dirty Snow. Tr. Romano, Marc. New York: NYRB Classics. 2003.; The Snow was Dirty. Translated by Curtis, Howard. UK: Penguin Classics. 2016. ISBN 978-0-241-25856-9. |
| Pedigree | 1948 | Pedigree. Tr. Baldick, Robert. London: Hamish Hamilton. 1962.; Pedigree. Tr. Baldick, Robert. New York: NYRB Classics. 2010. ISBN 978-1-59017-351-0 |
| Le fond de la bouteille | 1949 | The Bottom of the Bottle. Tr. Schaeffer, Cornelia. New York: Signet. 1954.; The Bottom of the Bottle. Tr. Schaeffer, Cornelia. London: Hamish Hamilton. 1977. |
| Les fantômes du chapelier | 1949 | The Hatter's Ghost. Tr. Ryan, Nigel. London: Hamish Hamilton. 1956.; The Hatter's Phantoms. Tr. Trask, Willard R. New York & London: HBJ. 1976.; The Hatter's Ghosts. Translated by Curtis, Howard. Penguin Classics. 2022. ISBN 978-0-241-54538-6. |
| Les quatres jours du pauvre homme | 1949 | Four Days in a Lifetime. Tr. Varèse, Louise. New York: Prentice-Hall. 1953. |
| Un nouveau dans la ville | 1950 | — |
| L'enterrement de Monsieur Bouvet | 1950 | The Burial of Monsieur Bouvet. Tr. MacCown, Eugene. Garden City, N.Y.: Doubleday. 1955.; Inquest on Bouvet. Tr. MacCown, Eugene. London: Hamish Hamilton. 1958. |
| Les volets verts | 1950 | The Heart of a Man. Tr. Varèse, Louise. New York: Prentice Hall. 1951.; The Heart of a Man. Tr. Varèse, Louise. London: Hamish Hamilton. 1955. |
| Tante Jeanne | 1950 | Aunt Jeanne. Tr. Sainsbury, Geoffrey. London: Routledge & Kegan Paul. 1953. |
| Le temps d'Anaïs | 1951 | The Girl in His Past. Tr. Varèse, Louise. New York: Prentice Hall. 1952. |
| Une vie comme neuve | 1951 | A New Lease of Life. Tr. Richardson, Joanna. London: Hamish Hamilton. 1963.; A New Lease on Life. Tr. Richardson, Joanna. Garden City, N. Y.: Doubleday. 1963. |
| Marie qui louche | 1951 | The Girl With a Squint. Tr. Trask, Willard, R.. New York: Harcourt, Brace Jovanovich. 1978. |
| La mort de Belle | 1952 | Belle. Tr. Varèse, Louise. London: Hamish Hamilton. 1954.; Belle. Tr. Varèse, Louise. Garden City, N. Y.: Doubleday. 1954. |
| Les frères Rico | 1952 | The Brothers Rico. Tr. Pawel, Ernest. London: Hamish Hamilton. 1954.; The Brothers Rico. Tr. Pawel, Ernest. Garden City, N. Y.: Doubleday. 1954. |
| Antoine et Julie | 1953 | The Magician. Tr. Sebba, Helen. Garden City, N. Y.: Doubleday. 1955.; The Magician. Tr. Sebba, Helen. London: Hamish Hamilton. 1974. |
| L'escalier de fer | 1953 | The Iron Staircase. Tr. Ellenbogen, Eileen. London: Hamish Hamilton. 1963. |
| Feux rouges | 1953 | Red Lights. Tr. Denny, Norman. London: Hamish Hamilton. 1955.; The Hitchhiker. Tr. Denny, Norman. Garden City, N. Y.: Doubleday. 1955.; Red Lights. Tr. Denny, Norman. New York: NYRB Classics. 2006. ISBN 1-59017-193-4 |
| Crime impuni | 1954 | Fugitive. Tr. Varèse, Louise. Garden City, N.Y.: Doubleday. 1955.; Account Unsettled. Tr. White, Tony. London: Hamish Hamilton. 1962. |
| L'horloger d'Everton | 1954 | The Watchmender of Everton. Tr. Denny, Norman. London: Hamish Hamilton. 1955.; The Watchmaker of Everton. Tr. Denny, Norman. Garden City, N.Y.: Doubleday. 1956. |
| Le grand Bob | 1954 | Big Bob. Tr. Lowe, Eileen. London: Hamish Hamilton. 1969. |
| Les témoins | 1955 | The Witnesses. Tr. Budberg, Moura. London: Hamish Hamilton. 1956.; The Witnesses. Tr. Budberg, Moura. Garden City, N.Y.: Doubleday. 1956. |
| La boule noire | 1955 | The Rules of the Game. Tr. Curtis, Howard. London: Hamish Hamilton. 1989. ISBN 978-0-241-12273-0 |
| Les complices | 1956 | The Accomplices. Tr. Frechtman, Bernard. New York: Harcourt, Brace & World. 1964.; The Accomplices. Tr. Frechtman, Bernard. London: Hamish Hamilton. 1966. |
| En cas de malheur | 1956 | In Case of Emergency. Tr. Sebba, Helen. Garden City, N.Y.:Doubleday. 1958.; In Case of Emergency. Tr. Sebba, Helen. London: Hamish Hamilton. 1960. |
| Le petit homme d'Arkhangelsk | 1957 | The Little Man from Archangel. Tr. Ryan, Nigel. London: Hamish Hamilton. 1957.; The Little Man from Archangel. Tr. Ryan, Nigel. New York: Harcourt Brace & World. 1966.; The Little Man from Archangel. Translated by Reynolds, Siân. Penguin Classics. 2021. ISBN 978-0-241-48706-8. |
| Le fils | 1957 | The Son. Tr. Woodward, Daphne. London: Hamish Hamilton. 1958. |
| Le nègre | 1957 | The Negro. Tr. Sebba, Helen. London: Hamish Hamilton. 1959. |
| Strip-tease | 1958 | Strip Tease. Tr. Brain, Robert. London: Hamish Hamilton. 1959. |
| Le président | 1958 | The Premier. Tr. Woodward, Daphne. London: Hamish Hamilton.1961.; The Premier. Tr. Woodward, Daphne. New York: Harcourt, Brace & World. 1966.; The Premier. Tr. Woodward, Daphne. New York: Melville House Publishing. 2012. ISBN 978-1-935554-62-2 |
| Le passage de la ligne | 1958 | — |
| Dimanche | 1959 | Sunday. Tr. Ryan, Nigel. London: Hamish Hamilton. 1960.; Sunday. Tr. Ryan, Nigel. New York: Harcourt, Brace & World. 1966. |
| La vieille | 1959 | The Grandmother. Tr. Stewart, Jean. New York: Harcourt Brace Jovanovich. 1980. |
| Le veufe | 1960 | The Widower. Tr. Baldick, Robert, London: Hamish Hamilton. 1961. |
| L'ours en peluche | 1960 | Teddy Bear. Tr. Clay, John. London: Hamish Hamilton. 1971.; Teddy Bear. Tr. Clay, John. New York: Harcourt Brace Jovanovich. 1972. |
| Betty | 1961 | Betty. Tr. Hamilton, Alastair. London: Hamish Hamilton. 1975.; Betty. Tr. Hamilton, Alastair. New York: Harcourt Brace Jovanovich. 1975.; Betty. Translated by Schwartz, Ros. Penguin Classics. 2021. ISBN 978-0-241-48708-2. |
| Le train | 1961 | The Train. Tr. Baldick, Robert. London: Hamish Hamilton. 1964.; The Train. Tr. Baldick, Robert. New York: Harcourt Brace Jovanovich. 1966.; The Train. Tr. Baldick, Robert. New York: Melville House. 2011. ISBN 978-1-935554-46-2 |
| La porte | 1962 | The Door. Tr. Woodward, Daphne. London: Hamish Hamilton. 1964. |
| Les autres | 1962 | The Others. Tr. Hamilton, Alastair. London: Hamish Hamilton. 1975.; The House On Quai Notre Dame. New York: Harcourt Brace Jovanovich. 1975. |
| Les anneaux de Bicêtre | 1963 | The Patient. Tr. Stewart, Jean, London: Hamish Hamilton. 1963.; The Bells of Bicêtre. New York: Harcourt, Brace & World. 1964. |
| La chambre bleue | 1964 | The Blue Room. Tr. Ellenbogen, Eileen. New York: Harcourt, Brace & World. 1964.; The Blue Room. Tr. Ellenbogen, Eileen. London: Hamish Hamilton. 1965. |
| L'homme au petit chien | 1964 | The Man with the Little Dog. Tr. Stewart, Jean. London: Hamish Hamilton. 1965. |
| Le petit saint | 1965 | The Little Saint. Tr. Frechtman, Bernard. New York: Harcourt, Brace & World. 1965; The Little Saint. Tr. Frechtman, Bernard. London: Hamish Hamilton. 1966. |
| Le train de Venise | 1965 | The Venice Train. Tr. Hamilton, Alastair. London: Hamish Hamilton. 1974.; The Venice Train. Tr. Hamilton, Alastair. New York: Harcourt Brace Jovanovich. 1974.; The Venice Train. Translated by Schwartz, Ros. UK: Penguin Classics. 2014. ISBN 978-0-241-54422-8. |
| Le confessionnal | 1966 | The Confessional. Tr. Stewart, Jean. London: Hamish Hamilton. 1967.; The Confessional. Tr. Stewart, Jean. New York: Harcourt Brace Jovanovich. 1968. |
| La mort d'Auguste | 1966 | The Old Man Dies. Tr. Frechtman, Bernard. New York: Harcourt, Brace & World. 1967.; The Old Man Dies. Tr. Frechtman, Bernard. London: Hamish Hamilton. 1968. |
| Le chat | 1967 | The Cat. Tr. Frechtman, Bernard. New York: Harcourt, Brace & World. 1967.; The Cat. Tr. Frechtman, Bernard. London: Hamish Hamilton. 1972. |
| Le déménagement | 1967 | The Neighbours. Tr. Sinclair-Stevenson, Christopher. London: Hamish Hamilton. 1968.; The Move. Tr. Sinclair-Stevenson, Christopher. New York: Harcourt, Brace & World. 1968. |
| La prison | 1968 | The Prison. Tr. Moir, Lyn. London: Hamish Hamilton. 1969; The Prison. Tr. Moir, Lyn. New York: Harcourt, Brace & World. 1969. |
| La main | 1968 | The Man on the Bench in the Barn. Tr. Budberg, Moura. London: Hamish Hamilton. 1970.; The Man on the Bench in the Barn. Tr. Budberg, Moura. New York: Harcourt Brace Jovanovich. 1970.; The Hand. Translated by Coverdale, Linda. UK: Penguin Classics. 2016. ISBN 978-0-241-28465-0. |
| Il y a encore des noisetiers | 1969 | — |
| Novembre | 1969 | November. Tr. Stewart, Jean. London: Hamish Hamilton. 1970.; November. Tr. Stewart, Jean. New York: Harcourt Brace Jovanovich. 1970. |
| Le riche homme | 1970 | The Rich Man. Tr. Stewart, Jean. London: Hamish Hamilton. 1971.; The Rich Man. Tr. Stewart, Jean. New York: Harcourt Brace Jovanovich. 1971. |
| La disparition d'Odile | 1971 | The Disappearance of Odile. Tr. Moir, Lyn. London: Hamish Hamilton. 1972.; The Disappearance of Odile. Tr. Moir, Lyn. New York: Harcourt Brace Jovanovich. 1972. |
| La cage de verre | 1971 | The Glass Cage. Tr. White, Antonia. London: Hamish Hamilton. 1973.; The Glass Cage. Tr. White, Antonia. New York: Harcourt Brace Jovanovich. 1973. |
| Les innocents | 1972 | The Innocents. Tr. Ellenbogen, Eileen. London: Hamish Hamilton. 1973.; The Innocents. Tr. Ellenbogen, Eileen. New York: Harcourt Brace Jovanovich. 1973. |

== Short fiction ==
The date of French publication refers to first commercial publication in book form, whether separately or as part of a collection. Most of the stories were originally published in newspapers or magazines. The sources for French publication are Bernard Alavoine, Trudee Young and Tout Maigret. The sources for first English publication are Trudee Young and Barry Forshaw. The source for most recent English publication is Penguin UK.

=== Inspector Maigret series ===
| French title | French collection | Selected English translations |
|---|---|---|
| "La péniche aux deux pendus" | Les nouvelles enquêtes de Maigret (1944) | "Two Bodies on a Barge" in Maigret's Pipe. Tr. Stewart, Jean. London: Hamish Hamilton. 1977.; "The Hanged Couple" in The New Investigations of Inspector Maigret. Translated by Curtis, Howard. UK: Penguin. 2022. ISBN 978-0-241-48854-6. |
| "L'affaire du boulevard Beaumarchais" | Les nouvelles enquêtes de Maigret (1944) | "The Mysterious Affair in the Boulevard Beaumarchais" in Maigret's Pipe. Tr. Stewart, Jean. London: Hamish Hamilton. 1977.; "The Boulevard Beaumarchais Case" in The New Investigations of Inspector Maigret. Translated by Curtis, Howard. UK: Penguin. 2022. ISBN 978-0-241-48854-6. |
| "La fenêtre ouverte" | Les nouvelles enquêtes de Maigret (1944) | "Open Window" in Maigret's Pipe. Tr. Stewart, Jean. London: Hamish Hamilton. 1977.; "The Open Window" in The New Investigations of Inspector Maigret. Translated by Curtis, Howard. UK: Penguin. 2022. ISBN 978-0-241-48854-6. |
| "Monsieur Lundi" | Les nouvelles enquêtes de Maigret (1944) | "Mr Monday" in Maigret's Pipe. Tr. Stewart, Jean. London: Hamish Hamilton. 1977.; "Monsieur Monday" in The New Investigations of Inspector Maigret. Translated by Curtis, Howard. UK: Penguin. 2022. ISBN 978-0-241-48854-6. |
| "Jeumont, 51 minutes d'arrêt!" | Les nouvelles enquêtes de Maigret (1944) | "Jeumont, 51 Minutes Wait!" in Maigret's Pipe. Tr. Stewart, Jean. London: Hamish Hamilton. 1977.; "Jeumont, Fifty-one-minute Halt!" in The New Investigations of Inspector Maigret. Translated by Curtis, Howard. UK: Penguin. 2022. ISBN 978-0-241-48854-6. |
| "Peine de mort" | Les nouvelles enquêtes de Maigret (1944) | "Death Penalty" in Maigret's Pipe. Tr. Stewart, Jean. London: Hamish Hamilton. 1977.; "Death Penalty" in The New Investigations of Inspector Maigret. Translated by Curtis, Howard. UK: Penguin. 2022. ISBN 978-0-241-48854-6. |
| "Les larmes de bougie" | Les nouvelles enquêtes de Maigret (1944) | "Journey Backward into Time" in The Short Cases of Inspector Maigret. Tr. Blochman, Lawrence G. Garden City, N. Y.: Doubleday. 1959.; "Death of a Woodlander" in Maigret's Pipe. Tr. Stewart, Jean. London: Hamish Hamilton. 1977.; "Candle Wax" in The New Investigations of Inspector Maigret. Translated by Curtis, Howard. UK: Penguin. 2022. ISBN 978-0-241-48854-6. |
| "Rue Pigalle" | Les nouvelles enquêtes de Maigret (1944) | "In the Rue Pigalle" in Maigret's Pipe. Tr. Stewart, Jean. London: Hamish Hamilton. 1977.; "Rue Pigalle" in The New Investigations of Inspector Maigret. Translated by Curtis, Howard. UK: Penguin. 2022. ISBN 978-0-241-48854-6. |
| "Un erreur de Maigret" | Les nouvelles enquêtes de Maigret (1944) | "Maigret's Mistake" in Maigret's Pipe. Tr. Stewart, Jean. London: Hamish Hamilton. 1977.; "Maigret Gets it Wrong" in The New Investigations of Inspector Maigret. Translated by Curtis, Howard. UK: Penguin. 2022. ISBN 978-0-241-48854-6. |
| "L'amoureux de Madame Maigret" | Les nouvelles enquêtes de Maigret (1944) | "Madame Maigret's Admirer" in Maigret's Pipe. Tr. Stewart, Jean. London: Hamish Hamilton. 1977.; "Madame Maigret's Suitor" in The New Investigations of Inspector Maigret. Translated by Schwarz, Ross. UK: Penguin. 2022. ISBN 978-0-241-48854-6. |
| "La vieille dame de Bayeux" | Les nouvelles enquêtes de Maigret (1944) | "The Old Lady of Bayeux" in The Short Cases of Inspector Maigret. Tr. Blochman, Lawrence G. Garden City, N. Y.: Doubleday. 1959.; "The Old Lady of Bayeux" in Maigret's Pipe. Tr. Stewart, Jean. London: Hamish Hamilton. 1977.; "The Old Lady From Bayeux" in The New Investigations of Inspector Maigret. Translated by Schwarz, Ross. UK: Penguin. 2022. ISBN 978-0-241-48854-6. |
| "L'auberge aux noyés" | Les nouvelles enquêtes de Maigret (1944) | "The Drowned Men's Inn" in Maigret's Pipe. Tr. Stewart, Jean. London: Hamish Hamilton. 1977.; "The Inn of the Drowned" in The New Investigations of Inspector Maigret. Translated by Schwarz, Ross. UK: Penguin. 2022. ISBN 978-0-241-48854-6. |
| "Stan-le-Tueur" | Les nouvelles enquêtes de Maigret (1944) | "Stan the Killer" in The Short Cases of Inspector Maigret. Tr. Blochman, Lawrence G. Garden City, N. Y.: Doubleday. 1959.; "Stan the Killer" in Maigret's Pipe. Tr. Stewart, Jean. London: Hamish Hamilton. 1977.; "Stan the Killer" in The New Investigations of Inspector Maigret. Translated by Schwarz, Ross. UK: Penguin. 2022. ISBN 978-0-241-48854-6. |
| "L'Étoile du Nord" | Les nouvelles enquêtes de Maigret (1944) | "At the Étoile du Nord" in Maigret's Pipe. Tr. Stewart, Jean. London: Hamish Hamilton. 1977.; "The Étoile du Nord" in The New Investigations of Inspector Maigret. Translated by Schwarz, Ross. UK: Penguin. 2022. ISBN 978-0-241-48854-6. |
| "Tempête sur La Manche" | Les nouvelles enquêtes de Maigret (1944) | "Storm in the Channel" in Maigret's Pipe. Tr. Stewart, Jean. London: Hamish Hamilton. 1977.; "Storm Over the Channel" in The New Investigations of Inspector Maigret. Translated by Schwarz, Ross. UK: Penguin. 2022. ISBN 978-0-241-48854-6. |
| "Mademoiselle Berthe et son amant" | Les nouvelles enquêtes de Maigret (1944) | "Mademoiselle Berthe and Her Lover" in Maigret's Pipe. Tr. Stewart, Jean. London: Hamish Hamilton. 1977.; "Mademoiselle Berthe's Lover" in The New Investigations of Inspector Maigret. Translated by Schwarz, Ross. UK: Penguin. 2022. ISBN 978-0-241-48854-6. |
| "Le notaire du Châteauneuf" | Les nouvelles enquêtes de Maigret (1944) | "The Three Daughters of the Lawyer" in Maigret's Pipe. Tr. Stewart, Jean. London: Hamish Hamilton. 1977.; "The Notary from Châteauneuf" in The New Investigations of Inspector Maigret. Translated by Schwarz, Ross. UK: Penguin. 2022. ISBN 978-0-241-48854-6. |
| "Maigret et l'inspecteur malgracieux" (also known as "Maigret et l'inspecteur malchanceux") | Maigret et l'inspecteur malchanceux (1947) | "Maigret and the Surly Inspector" in Maigret's Christmas, complete Maigret short stories Vol I. Tr. Stewart, Jean. London: Hamish Hamilton. 1976. |
| "Le témoinage de l'enfant de choeur" | Maigret et l'inspecteur malchanceux (1947) | "The Evidence of the Altar Boy" in Maigret's Christmas, complete Maigret short stories Vol I. Tr. Stewart, Jean. London: Hamish Hamilton. 1976. |
| "Le client le plus obstiné du monde" | Maigret et l'inspecteur malchanceux (1947) | "The Most Obstinant Man in Paris" in The Short Cases of Inspector Maigret. Tr. Blochman, Lawrence G. Garden City, N. Y.: Doubleday. 1959.; "The Most Obstinate Customer in the World" in Maigret's Christmas, complete Maigret short stories Vol I. Tr. Stewart, Jean. London: Hamish Hamilton. 1976. |
| "On ne tue pas les pauvres types" | Maigret et l'inspecteur malchanceux (1947) | "Death of a Nobody" in Maigret's Christmas, complete Maigret short stories Vol I. Tr. Stewart, Jean. London: Hamish Hamilton. 1976. |
| "La pipe de Maigret" | La pipe de Maigret (1947) | "Maigret's Pipe" in Maigret's Pipe. Tr. Stewart, Jean. London: Hamish Hamilton. 1977. |
| "L'homme dans la rue" | Maigret et les petits cochon sans queue (1950) | "The Man in the Street" in Maigret's Christmas, complete Maigret short stories Vol I. Tr. Stewart, Jean. London: Hamish Hamilton. 1976.; "The Man on the Streets" in Death Threats and Other Stories. Translated by Schwarz, Ross. UK: Penguin. 2021. ISBN 978-0-14-199550-2. |
| "Vente à la bougie" | Maigret et les petits cochon sans queue (1950) | "Sale by Auction" in Maigret's Christmas, complete Maigret short stories Vol I. Tr. Stewart, Jean. London: Hamish Hamilton. 1976.; "Candle Auction" in Death Threats and Other Stories. Translated by Schwarz, Ross. UK: Penguin. 2021. ISBN 978-0-14-199550-2. |
| "Un Noël de Maigret" | Un Noël de Maigret (1951) | "Maigret's Christmas" in The Short Cases of Inspector Maigret. Tr. Blochman, Lawrence G. Garden City, N. Y.: Doubleday. 1959.; "Maigret's Christmas" in Maigret's Christmas, complete Maigret short stories Vol I. Tr. Stewart, Jean. London: Hamish Hamilton. 1976.; "A Maigret Christmas" in A Maigret Christmas and Other Stories. Translated by Coward, David. UK: Penguin. 2018. ISBN 978-0-241-35674-6. |
| "L'improbable Monsieur Owen" | Éditions Rencontre (1967) | "The Improbable Mr Owen" in Death Threats and Other Stories. Translated by Schwarz, Ross. UK: Penguin. 2021. ISBN 978-0-14-199550-2. |
| "Ceux du Grand Café" | Éditions Rencontre (1967) | "The Men at the Grand Café" in Death Threats and Other Stories. Translated by Schwarz, Ross. UK: Penguin. 2021. ISBN 978-0-14-199550-2. |
| "Menaces de mort" | Tout Simenon (1992) | "Death Threats" in Death Threats and Other Stories. Translated by Schwarz, Ross. UK: Penguin. 2021. ISBN 978-0-14-199550-2. |

=== Other short fiction ===
| French title | French collection | Selected English translations |
|---|---|---|
| "Ziliouk" | Les treize coupables (1932) | "Ziliouk" in The Thirteen Culprits. Translated by Schulman, Peter. Cincinnati: Crippin and Landru. 2002. ISBN 978-1-885941-78-7. |
| "Monsieur Rodrigues" | Les treize coupables (1932) | "Monsieur Rodrigues" in The Thirteen Culprits. Translated by Schulman, Peter. Cincinnati: Crippin and Landru. 2002. ISBN 978-1-885941-78-7. |
| "Madame Smitt" | Les treize coupables (1932) | "Madame Smitt" in The Thirteen Culprits. Translated by Schulman, Peter. Cincinnati: Crippin and Landru. 2002. ISBN 978-1-885941-78-7. |
| "Les « Flamands »" | Les treize coupables (1932) | "The 'Flemings'" in The Thirteen Culprits. Translated by Schulman, Peter. Cincinnati: Crippin and Landru. 2002. ISBN 978-1-885941-78-7. |
| "Nouchi" | Les treize coupables (1932) | "Nouchi" in The Thirteen Culprits. Translated by Schulman, Peter. Cincinnati: Crippin and Landru. 2002. ISBN 978-1-885941-78-7. |
| "Arnold Schuttringer" | Les treize coupables (1932) | "Arnold Schuttringer" in The Thirteen Culprits. Translated by Schulman, Peter. Cincinnati: Crippin and Landru. 2002. ISBN 978-1-885941-78-7. |
| "Waldemar Strvzeski" | Les treize coupables (1932) | "Waldemar Strvzeski" in The Thirteen Culprits. Translated by Schulman, Peter. Cincinnati: Crippin and Landru. 2002. ISBN 978-1-885941-78-7. |
| "Philippe" | Les treize coupables (1932) | "Philippe" in The Thirteen Culprits. Translated by Schulman, Peter. Cincinnati: Crippin and Landru. 2002. ISBN 978-1-885941-78-7. |
| "Nicolas" | Les treize coupables (1932) | "Nicolas" in The Thirteen Culprits. Translated by Schulman, Peter. Cincinnati: Crippin and Landru. 2002. ISBN 978-1-885941-78-7. |
| "Les Timmermans" | Les treize coupables (1932) | "The Timmermans" in The Thirteen Culprits. Translated by Schulman, Peter. Cincinnati: Crippin and Landru. 2002. ISBN 978-1-885941-78-7. |
| "Le Pacha" | Les treize coupables (1932) | "The Pacha" in The Thirteen Culprits. Translated by Schulman, Peter. Cincinnati: Crippin and Landru. 2002. ISBN 978-1-885941-78-7. |
| "Otto Müller" | Les treize coupables (1932) | "Otto Müller" in The Thirteen Culprits. Translated by Schulman, Peter. Cincinnati: Crippin and Landru. 2002. ISBN 978-1-885941-78-7. |
| "Bus" | Les treize coupables (1932) | "Bus" in The Thirteen Culprits. Translated by Schulman, Peter. Cincinnati: Crippin and Landru. 2002. ISBN 978-1-885941-78-7. |
| | Les treize enigmes (short story collection, 1932) | — |
| | Les treize mystères (short story collection, 1932) | — |
| | La mauvaise étoile (collection of travel stories, 1938) | — |
| "Le Grand langoustier" | in Les sept minutes (1938) | — |
| La Nuit des sept minutes | in Les sept minutes (1938) | — |
| "L’Enigme de la Marie Galante" | in Les sept minutes (1938) | — |
| "Le Flair du Petit Docteur" | Le petit docteur (1943) | "The Doctor's Hunch" in The Little Doctor. Tr. Stewart, Jean. London: Hamish Hamilton. 1978. ISBN 978-0-241-89989-2 |
| "La Demoiselle en bleu pâle" | Le petit docteur (1943) | "The Girl in Pale Blue" in The Little Doctor. Tr. Stewart, Jean. London: Hamish Hamilton. 1978. ISBN 978-0-241-89989-2 |
| "Une femme a crié" | Le petit docteur (1943) | "A Woman Screamed" in The Little Doctor. Tr. Stewart, Jean. London: Hamish Hamilton. 1978. ISBN 978-0-241-89989-2 |
| "Le Fantôme de M. Marbe" | Le petit docteur (1943) | "The Haunting of Monsieur Marbe" in The Little Doctor. Tr. Stewart, Jean. London: Hamish Hamilton. 1978. ISBN 978-0-241-89989-2 |
| "Les Mariés du 1er décembre" | Le petit docteur (1943) | "The Midwinter Marriage" in The Little Doctor. Tr. Stewart, Jean. London: Hamish Hamilton. 1978. ISBN 978-0-241-89989-2 |
| "Le Mort tombé du ciel" | Le petit docteur (1943) | "The Corpse in the Kitchen Garden" in The Little Doctor. Tr. Stewart, Jean. London: Hamish Hamilton. 1978. ISBN 978-0-241-89989-2 |
| "La Bonne fortune du Hollandais" | Le petit docteur (1943) | "The Dutchman's Luck" in The Little Doctor. Tr. Stewart, Jean. London: Hamish Hamilton. 1978. ISBN 978-0-241-89989-2 |
| "Le Passager et son nègre" | Le petit docteur (1943) | "Paupaul and His Negro" in The Little Doctor. Tr. Stewart, Jean. London: Hamish Hamilton. 1978. ISBN 978-0-241-89989-2 |
| "La Piste de l’homme roux" | Le petit docteur (1943) | "The Trail of the Red-Haired Man" in The Little Doctor. Tr. Stewart, Jean. London: Hamish Hamilton. 1978. ISBN 978-0-241-89989-2 |
| "L’Amiral a disparu" | Le petit docteur (1943) | "The Disappearance of the Admiral" in The Little Doctor. Tr. Stewart, Jean. London: Hamish Hamilton. 1978. ISBN 978-0-241-89989-2 |
| "La Sonnette d’alarme" | Le petit docteur (1943) | "The Communication Cord" in The Little Doctor. Tr. Stewart, Jean. London: Hamish Hamilton. 1978. ISBN 978-0-241-89989-2 |
| "Le Château de l’arsenic" | Le petit docteur (1943) | "Arsenic Hall" in The Little Doctor. Tr. Stewart, Jean. London: Hamish Hamilton. 1978. ISBN 978-0-241-89989-2 |
| "L’Amoureux aux pantoufles" | Le petit docteur (1943) | "Death in a Department Store" in The Little Doctor. Tr. Stewart, Jean. London: Hamish Hamilton. 1978. ISBN 978-0-241-89989-2 |
| "La Cage d’Emile" | Les dossiers de l'Agence O (1943) | — |
| "La Cabane en bois" | Les dossiers de l'Agence O (1943) | — |
| "L’Homme tout nu" | Les dossiers de l'Agence O (1943) | — |
| "L’Arrestation du musicien" | Les dossiers de l'Agence O (1943) | — |
| "L’Etrangleur de Moret" | Les dossiers de l'Agence O (1943) | — |
| "Le Vieillard au porte-mine" | Les dossiers de l'Agence O (1943) | — |
| "Les Trois bateaux de la calanque" | Les dossiers de l'Agence O (1943) | — |
| "La Fleuriste de Deauville" | Les dossiers de l'Agence O (1943) | — |
| "Le Ticket de métro" | Les dossiers de l'Agence O (1943) | — |
| "Emile à Bruxelles" | Les dossiers de l'Agence O (1943) | — |
| "Le Prisonnier de Lagny" | Les dossiers de l'Agence O (1943) | — |
| "Le Club des vieilles dames" | Les dossiers de l'Agence O (1943) | — |
| "Le Docteur Tant-Pis" | Les dossiers de l'Agence O (1943) | — |
| "Le Chantage de l’Agence O" | Les dossiers de l'Agence O (1943) | — |
| "Les Petits cochons sans queue" | Maigret et les petits cochon sans queue (1950) | — |
| "Sous peine de mort" | Maigret et les petits cochon sans queue (1950) | — |
| "Le Petit tailleur et le chapelier" | Maigret et les petits cochon sans queue (1950) | — |
| "Un certain monsieur Berquin" | Maigret et les petits cochon sans queue (1950) | — |
| "L’Escale de Buenaventura" | Maigret et les petits cochon sans queue (1950) | — |
| "Le Deuil de Fonsine" | Maigret et les petits cochon sans queue (1950) | — |
| "Madame Quatre et ses enfants" | Maigret et les petits cochon sans queue (1950) | — |
| "Sept petites croix dans un carnet" | Un Noël de Maigret (1951) | "Seven Small Crosses in a Notebook" in Maigret's Christmas, complete Maigret short stories Vol I. Tr. Stewart, Jean. London: Hamish Hamilton. 1976.; "Seven Small Crosses in a Notebook" in A Maigret Christmas and Other Stories. Translated by Coward, David. UK: Penguin. 2018. ISBN 978-0-241-35674-6. |
| "Le Petit restaurant des Ternes" | Un Noël de Maigret (1951) | "The Little Restaurant in Les Ternes" in A Maigret Christmas and Other Stories. Translated by Coward, David. UK: Penguin. 2018. ISBN 978-0-241-35674-6. |
| "La Femme du pilote" | Le Bateau d’Emile (1954) | — |
| "Le Doigt de Barraquier" | Le Bateau d’Emile (1954) | — |
| "Valérie s’en va" | Le Bateau d’Emile (1954) | — |
| "L’Epingle en fer à cheval" | Le Bateau d’Emile (1954) | — |
| "Le Baron de l’écluse ou la croisière du 'Potam'" | Le Bateau d’Emile (1954) | — |
| "Le Nègre s’est endormi" | Le Bateau d’Emile (1954) | — |
| "L’Homme à barbe" (later republished as "Nicholas") | Le Bateau d’Emile (1954) | — |
| "Le Bateau d’Emile" | Le Bateau d’Emile (1954) | — |
| "La Rue aux trois poussins" | La Rue aux trois poussins (1963) | — |
| "Le Comique du Saint-Antoine” | La Rue aux trois poussins (1963) | — |
| "Le Mari de Mélie" | La Rue aux trois poussins (1963) | — |
| "Le Capitaine du Vasco” | La Rue aux trois poussins (1963) | — |
| "Le Crime du Malgracieux" | La Rue aux trois poussins (1963) | — |
| "Le Docteur de Kirkenes" | La Rue aux trois poussins (1963) | — |
| "La Piste du Hollandais" | La Rue aux trois poussins (1963) | — |
| "Les Demoiselles de Queue-de-Vache" | La Rue aux trois poussins (1963) | — |
| "Le Matin des trois absoutes" | La Rue aux trois poussins (1963) | — |
| "Le Naufrage de l’Armoire à Glace” | La Rue aux trois poussins (1963) | — |
| "Les Mains pleines" | La Rue aux trois poussins (1963) | — |
| "Nicolas" (previously published as "L'Homme à barbe") | La Rue aux trois poussins (1963) | — |
| "Annette et la dame blonde" | La Rue aux trois poussins (1963) | — |
| "La chanteuse de Pigalle" | Tout Simenon, Tome 12 (1990) | — |
| "L’invalide à la tête de bois" | Tout Simenon, Tome 12 (1990) | — |
| "Le gros lot" | Tout Simenon, Tome 12 (1990) | — |
| "La folle d'Itteville" | Tout Simenon, Tome 18 (1991) | — |
| "L’affaire du canal" | Tout Simenon, Tome 18 (1991) | — |
| "Sing-Sing ou La maison des trois marches" | Tout Simenon, Tome 18 (1991) | — |
| "Mademoiselle Augustine" | Tout Simenon, Tome 18 (1991) | — |
| "Moss et Hoch" | Tout Simenon, Tome 18 (1991) | — |
| "L’as de l’arrestation" | Tout Simenon, Tome 18 (1991) | — |
| "Le capitaine Philips et les petits cochons" | Tout Simenon, Tome 20 (1992) | — |
| "L’oranger des îles Marquises" | Tout Simenon, Tome 22 (1992) | — |
| "Monsieur Mimosa" | Tout Simenon, Tome 22 (1992) | — |
| "Les trois messieurs du consortium" | Tout Simenon, Tome 22 (1992) | — |
| "L’homme qui mitraillait les rats" | Tout Simenon, Tome 22 (1992) | — |
| "La tête de Joseph" | Tout Simenon, Tome 22 (1992) | — |
| "Little Samuel à Tahiti" | Tout Simenon, Tome 22 (1992) | — |
| "Le vieux couple de Cherbourg" | Tout Simenon, Tome 22 (1992) | — |
| "La révolte du canari" | Tout Simenon, Tome 22 (1992) | — |
| "Le châle de Marie Dudon" | Tout Simenon, Tome 22 (1992) | — |
| "Le destin de Monsieur Saft" | Tout Simenon, Tome 22 (1992) | — |
| "Les cent mille francs de P’tite Madame" | Tout Simenon, Tome 22 (1992) | — |
| "L’aventurier au parapluie" | Tout Simenon, Tome 22 (1992) | — |
| "La cabane à Flipke" | Tout Simenon, Tome 22 (1992) | — |
| "Les mystères du Grand-Saint-Georges" | Tout Simenon, Tome 24 (2003) | — |

== Autobiographical works ==
| French title | Year of French publication | Selected English translations |
|---|---|---|
| Je me souviens | 1945 | — |
| Quand j'étais vieux | 1970 | When I was Old. Tr. Eustis, Helen. New York: Harcourt Brace Jovanovich. 1971.; When I was Old. Tr. Eustis, Helen. London: Hamish Hamilton. 1972. |
| Lettre à ma mère | 1974 | Letter to My Mother. Tr. Manheim, Ralph. New York: Harcourt Brace Jovanovich. 1976.; Letter to My Mother. Tr. Manheim, Ralph. London: Hamish Hamilton. 1976.; Letter to My Mother. UK: Penguin Classics. 2018. ISBN 978-0-241-33966-4. |
| Un homme comme un autre | 1975 | — |
| Des traces de pas | 1975 | — |
| Les petits hommes | 1976 | — |
| Vent du nord, vent du sud | 1976 | — |
| Un banc au soleil | 1977 | — |
| De la cave au grenier | 1977 | — |
| A l'abri de notre arbre | 1977 | — |
| Tant que je suis vivant | 1978 | — |
| Vacances obligatoires | 1978 | — |
| La main dans la main | 1978 | — |
| Au-delà de ma porte-fenêtre | 1978 | — |
| Je suis resté un enfant du choeur | 1979 | — |
| À quoi bon jurer? | 1979 | — |
| Point-virgule | 1979 | — |
| Le prix d'un homme | 1980 | — |
| On dit que j'ai soixante-quinze ans | 1980 | — |
| Quand vient le froid | 1980 | — |
| Les libertés quíl nous reste | 1980 | — |
| La femme endormie | 1981 | — |
| Jour et nuit | 1981 | — |
| Destinées | 1981 | — |
| Mémoires intimes | 1981 | Intimate memoirs, including Marie-Jo's book. Tr. Salemson, Harold J. San Diego : Harcourt Brace Jovanovich. 1984. |

== Other non- fiction ==
- Mes apprentissages, Vol I: À la découverte de la France (collected journalism, 1976)
- Mes apprentissages, Vol II: À la recherche de l'homme nu (collected journalism, 1976)
- Mes apprentissages, Vol III: À la rencontre des autres (collected journalism, 1989)
- Portrait-souvenir de Balzac et autres textes sur la littérature (collected essays on literature, 1991)

== Works cited ==
Alavoine, Bernard (1998). Georges Simenon Parcours d'une œuvre (in French). Encrage Édition. ISBN 978-2-36058-943-2.

Forshaw, Barry (2022). Simenon, The Man, The Books, The Films, A 21st Century Guide. UK: Oldcastle Books. ISBN 978-0-85730-416-2.

Marnham, Patrick (1994). The Man Who Wasn't Maigret, a portrait of Georges Simenon. Harcourt Brace & Company. ISBN 0-15-600059-8.

Simenon, Georges (1988–1993). Tout Simenon (27 volumes) (in French). Paris: Press de la Cité / Omnibus.

Simenon, Georges (2003–2007). Tout Maigret (10 volumes) (in French). Paris: Omnibus. ISBN 978-2-258-07340-1.

Young, Trudee (1976). Georges Simenon, a checklist of his 'Maigret' and other mystery novels and short stories in French and in English translations. Metuchen, N.J.: The Scarecrow Press. ISBN 0-8108-0964-8.
