= Cecile Is Dead =

Cecile Is Dead may refer to:

- Cecile Is Dead, another name for the detective novel Maigret and the Spinster
- Cecile Is Dead (film), a film based on the novel
