= The Couple from Poitiers =

1946 novel by Georges Simenon

- Title page for Les noces de Poitiers (1960 edition)
- Author: Georges Simenon
- Original title: Les noces de Poitiers
- Translator: Eileen Ellenbogen
- Language: French
- Publisher: Gallimard
- Publication date: 1946
- Publication place: France
- English publication date: 1985

Les noces de Poitiers (1946), translated as The Couple from Poitiers, is a novel by Belgian writer Georges Simenon; it is one of the author's self-described roman durs or "hard novels" to distinguish it from his romans populaires or "popular novels," which are primarily mysteries that usually feature his famous Inspector Maigret character.

The book is divided into eight chapters, and is written using the third person narrative mode.

Les noces de Poitiers was translated into English by Eileen Ellenbogen for Hamish Hamilton in 1985.

== Background and composition ==
In 1922, Georges Simenon became secretary to the writer Binet-Valmer; a frustrating experience that parallels that of the main character Gérard in the novel. It is because of this that Simenon's biographer Pierre Assouline describes The Couple from Poitiers as one of the author's most autobiographical works.

Les noces de Poitiers was written during the winter of 1943-4 at Saint-Mesmin-le-Vieux in the Vendée. It was serialized in Dimanche Paysage during October of 1945, before being published in book form by Gallimard in May 1946.

== Plot summary ==
The story opens in Poitiers at the joyless and drab wedding of Gérard Auvinet and Linette Bonfils, both twenty years old. Their families are unaware that Linette is pregnant, and Gérard's mother, a destitute widow, disapproves of their union and worries that her son's already precarious financial situation will only become worse as a result. The young couple leave Poitiers for Paris to conceal Linette's pregnancy and hope to find success in the city.

Life in Paris for them is difficult, and worries about money are a daily occurrence. Gérard is young and full of ambition, but is indecisive and has few opportunities. Through an acquaintance, he gets a poorly-paid job at The League of Patriotic Frenchman, ostensibly as the private secretary to the head of the association, but in reality he is little more than an office boy who stuffs envelopes. He soon becomes bored with his situation, and to make matters worse, Linette falls seriously ill.

Gérard struggles, alone at first, to provide for them, before accepting help from Pilar, a well-heeled woman he meets in a bar. Pilar, whom he begins an affair with, asks Gérard to sell a valuable emerald ring she has acquired from a wealthy older patron. Gérard learns that man has stolen the ring, along with other items of jewelry, from his estranged daughters. Realizing Pilar's venality, Gérard breaks with her and gives up on the path he has embarked upon.

In the meantime, Linette recovers and gives birth to a daughter. Gérard sees this as a sign of destiny, and is encouraged to take responsibility for himself and his new family. He accepts the prospect of a more regular life thanks to a modest job with a newspaper in Tulle.

== Reception ==
Kirkus Reviews describes The Couple from Poiters as "a small, mild cautionary tale," with an "unconvincing conclusion--but a low-key, grimly effective slice-of-life in the flat, unsentimental Simenon manner."

Publishers Weekly praises Eileen Ellenbogen's translation for retaining "the strength of the author's personality."
