= A Crime in Holland =

1931 novel by Georges Simenon

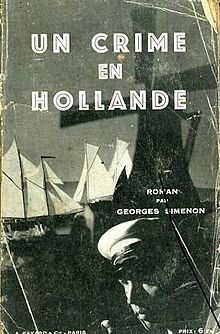
- Author: Georges Simenon
- Original title: Un crime en Hollande
- Language: French
- Series: Inspector Maigret
- Genre: Detective fiction
- Set in: The Netherlands
- Publisher: Fayard
- Publication date: 1931
- Publication place: France
- Preceded by: Night at the Crossroads
- Followed by: The Grand Banks Café

A Crime in Holland (French: Un crime en Hollande) is a 1931 detective novel by the Belgian writer Georges Simenon, featuring Simenon's character Detective Chief Inspector Maigret. The plot involves Maigret's unofficial investigation of the murder of a teacher at the Delfzijl Naval College in the Netherlands. A French university professor is one of the suspects. The novel has been translated into English twice and adapted for television twice.

== Plot ==
The novel is set in the northeasternmost province of the Netherlands, Groningen, in the port city of Delfzij

Detective Chief Inspector Maigret of the French judicial police conducts an unofficial investigation of the murder of Conrad Popinga, a teacher at the Delfzijl Naval College in the Netherlands. A suspect is Jean Duclos, a French university professor who was a guest at Popinga's home.

After Duclos had given a lecture in a local hall, the Popingas had held a small party for him in their home. Afterwards, Conrad had accompanied one of the guests, 18-year-old Beetje Liewens, home on their bicycles. Duclos went upstairs to his room and some time later heard a gunshot. He found a pistol in the upstairs bathroom. Madame Popinga, whose room was also upstairs, saw him holding Conrad's pistol. They went downstairs to investigate and were soon joined by Madame Popinga's sister Any, who slept in the study upstairs. They discovered the dying Conrad near the bicycle shed. The police found a sailor's cap in the bath upstairs; the bath had been covered by a wooden cover which the family used as an ironing board.

Inspector Pijpekam of the Dutch police tells Maigret that the cap belongs to a local man named Oosting, who had been staying on his boat moored near Popinga's house.

On the night of the murder, Madame Popinga, watching from her bedroom window, saw her husband accompanying Beetje to her home. Conrad then cycled back and Beetje followed him from a distance. Another party guest, naval college student Cornelius Barens, returned to the college boat ten minutes after Conrad was shot.

At the Popinga house, Maigret learns that Any could not leave the study without passing through either Madame Popinga's bedroom or the guest bedroom where Duclos was staying. He later sees Cornelius meeting Beetje near her farmhouse and embracing her. Maigret questions Cornelius who admits that he was outside the Popinga house when Conrad was shot. He wants to marry Beetje and is afraid he will be accused of Conrad's murder.

At the Popinga house, Maigret interrupts a tense discussion between Beetje's father, Madame Popinga and Any. Beetje's father has found love letters from Conrad to Beetje. Madame Popinga then produces letters from Beetje to Conrad which show that Beetje was urging Conrad to leave his wife and elope with her to America, and that Conrad thought this was impossible.

Over lunch, Pijpekam tells Maigret he believes a foreign sailor stole Oosting's cap then killed Conrad and left the country. Duclos later tells Maigret that Delfzijl is a conservative town and the Popingas are a respectable family. He urges Maigret not to pursue "truth for truth's sake" but allow the Dutch police to conclude the investigation in their own way.

Beetje meets Maigret at the inn and asks him to help her leave Delfzijl. Beetje's father comes looking for her, and Maigret tells him that the murderer will be arrested that night. Beetje's father immediately tries to shoot himself, but Maigret wrestles the gun from him.

Maigret organises a reconstruction of the events of the night of the murder. As the group walks along the canal from the lecture hall to Popinga's home, they pass Oosting's boat. Maigret finds that Any was the only one in the group who had the opportunity to take Oosting's cap from the deck. Later, Cornelius tries to shoot Maigret from the bathroom window using Conrad's revolver, unaware that Maigret had loaded it with blanks.

Maigret assembles the group in Popinga's parlour. He alleges that Any had fallen in love with Conrad but, suspecting he was having an affair with Beetje, decided to kill him rather than lose him to Beetje. She stole Oosting's cap and later sneaked past her sister while she was spying on Conrad and Beetje from her window. She shot Conrad from the bathroom, then hid in the bath. After Duclos and Madame Popinga went downstairs, she followed them, leaving Oosting's cap in the bath.

Maigret says Beetje's father thought his daughter was the killer and tried to shoot himself when he imagined Maigret was about to expose her. Cornelius thought Madame Popinga was the killer and tried to shoot Maigret to protect her. Maigret leaves for Paris early the next morning. No one thanks him for his investigation or sees him off at the station. He later learns that Any killed herself on the day her murder trial was due to start.

== Background ==
In the spring of 1929, Simenon set off for a tour of northern France, Belgium and Holland in his boat, the Ostrogoth. In September, the boat was laid up for repairs in Delfzijl in the northern tip of the Netherlands. Simenon later stated that it was in Delfzijl that he invented his character Chief Inspector Maigret. A Crime in Holland was written in May 1931. It was the eighth novel Simenon wrote in the Inspector Maigret series but the seventh to be published.

== Publication history ==
The novel was first published in French as Un crime en Hollande by Fayard in Paris in 1931. It was first translated into English by Geoffrey Sainsbury in 1940 and published as A Crime in Holland by George Routledge and Sons in London. In 1980 it was republished as Maigret in Holland. A new translation by Siân Reynolds was published as A Crime in Holland by Penguin books in 2014.

== Adaptations ==
The novel was filmed for television in 1976 as part of the French Antenne 2 series: "Les Enquêtes du Commissaire Maigret", with Jean Richard playing Maigret. It was adapted again for French television in 1996 as "Maigret en Finlande", with Bruno Crémer playing Maigret.

== Bibliography ==
- Forshaw, Barry (2022). Simenon: the Man, the Books, the Films, a 21st Century Guide. Harpenden, UK: Oldcastle Books. ISBN 9780857305145.
- Marnham, Patrick (1994). The Man Who Wasn't Maigret, A Portrait of Georges Simenon. Harcourt Brace & Company. ISBN 0-15-600059-8.
- Simenon, Georges (2014). A Crime in Holland. Translated by Reynolds, Siân. London: Penguin. ISBN 9780141976747.
- Wenger, Murielle; Trussel, Stephen (2017). Maigret's World: A Reader's Companion to Simenon's Famous Detective. Jefferson, North Carolina: McFarland & Company. ISBN 978-1-4766-2925-4.
- Young, Trudee (1976). Georges Simenon, a checklist of his 'Maigret' and other mystery novels and short stories in French and in English translations. Metuchen, N.J.: The Scarecrow Press. ISBN 0-8108-0964-8.
