= To Any Lengths =

1944 novel by Georges Simenon

- Author: Georges Simenon
- Original title: French: Signé Picpus
- Translator: Geoffrey Sainsbury, David Coward
- Language: French
- Series: Inspector Jules Maigret
- Genre: Detective fiction, Crime fiction
- Publisher: Gallimard
- Publication date: 1944
- Publication place: Belgium
- English publication date: 1950
- Media type: Print
- Preceded by: Maigret and the Spinster
- Followed by: Maigret and the Toy Village

To Any Lengths (other English-language titles are Maigret and the Fortuneteller and Signed, Picpus; French: Signé Picpus) is a detective novel by Belgian writer Georges Simenon, featuring his iconic character Inspector Jules Maigret of the French Judicial Police.

== Translations ==
The book has been translated three times into English: in 1950 as To Any Lengths and in 1989 as Maigret and the Fortuneteller translated by Geoffrey Sainsbury and in 2015 as Signed, Picpus translated by David Coward.

== Adaptations ==
The novel has been adapted several times for cinema and television:

In French

- 1968: as Signé Picpus, with Jean Richard in the lead role;
- 2003: as Signé Picpus, with Bruno Cremer;

In Italian

- 1965: as L'affare Picpus, with Gino Cervi in the main role;

In English

- 1962: as The Crystal Ball, with Rupert Davies;

In Japanese

- 1978: as Keishi to satsujin yōkoku, with Kinya Aikawa in Maigret's role;

== Literature ==
- Maurice Piron, Michel Lemoine, L'Univers de Simenon, guide des romans et nouvelles (1931-1972) de Georges Simenon, Presses de la Cité, 1983, p. 298-299 ISBN 978-2-258-01152-6 (in French)
