= Belle (1952 novel) =

1952 novel by Georges Simenon

- Cover of the 1st French edition
- Author: Georges Simenon
- Original title: La Mort de Belle
- Translator: Louise Varèse
- Language: French
- Publisher: Presses de la Cité
- Publication date: 1952
- Publication place: Belgium
- English publication date: 1954
- Media type: Print

Belle (La mort de Belle, 1952) is a novel by Belgian writer Georges Simenon; it is one of the author's self-described roman durs or "hard novels" to distinguish it from his romans populaires or "popular novels," which are primarily mysteries that usually feature his famous Inspector Maigret character.

La mort de Belle was translated into English by Louise Varèse in 1954.

== Composition ==
While residing at Shadow Rock Farm in Lakeville, Connecticut, Simenon wrote La mort de Belle over the course of ten days in December 1951. In the novel, the town of Litchfield is clearly meant to represent the town of Lakeville.

== Plot summary ==
Spencer Ashby is a history teacher at Crestview School in the small town of Litchfield, New York. One snowy evening, his wife Christine goes to play bridge with friends, but Spencer decides to remain at home where he grades some students' papers and then works at his lathe in his basement workshop.

The Ashbys are a childless couple in their forties, but are temporarily allowing eighteen-year-old Belle Sherman, the troubled daughter of one of Christine's college roommates, to stay with them. Spencer almost completely ignores the girl to such an extent that she is barely even described to the reader. Belle, too, is away that evening at the movies, but arrives home early and unexpectedly, though Spencer is indifferent to her, and cannot hear what she says to him over the sound of his lathe. Christine returns home later, and everyone in the household apparently goes to bed for the night as usual.

The next morning, having just made his usual drive from his home to Crestview, Spencer receives an urgent call and is summoned back home. Belle has been found inexplicably strangled to death in her room. An investigation begins, bringing Spencer into contact with coroner Bill Ryan, his secretary Anna Moeller, and Lieutenant Averell of the State Police. Spencer is subjected to intense questioning by the authorities, and feels even more humiliated when the school principal asks him to stay home from his classes.

Information gathered by the FBI in Virginia, where Belle lived, reveals that she has had several love affairs and is far from the well-behaved young girl that the Ashbys had imagined her to be. It is also established that Belle had not been to the cinema, and that she had been seen the same evening in the company of a man. While Ryan suspects Spencer, Averell is more of a psychologist, and understands that his naiveté is the best indication of his innocence. Meanwhile, the investigation reaches a dead end. Despite Christine's sympathy, and the kindness of a policeman, Mr. Holloway, Spencer's mood begins to fray as public opinion begins to turn against him. His house is tarred with the letter "M," the neighborhood children become suspicious of him, and he feels excluded from the community. He is summoned to be re-examined by Ryan. He expects to be charged with Belle's murder, but is not, at least for the moment.

On the way home from being questioned, he stops at a bar and orders a drink. Because his father committed suicide due to alcoholism, Spencer has always considered drinking to be something forbidden to him, but succumbs to temptation and begins to unravel. Afterwards, he ends up at a cafeteria where, by chance, he runs into Ryan's secretary Anna Moeller, and a conversation with her quickly becomes intimate. The two impulsively decide to go to a bar near Hartford, and Spencer's drinking continues. They leave to have sex in Spencer's car, but there he finds himself to be impotent, and Anna ridicules him; as a result, Spencer suddenly becomes frantic and strangles her.

Returning to the bar by himself with his face smeared with Anna's lipstick, some of the bar's other patrons quickly discover that there is a dead woman in his car, and realizing what has happened, beat Spencer savagely before Lieutenant Averell arrives to arrest him. As he loses consciousness, Spencer realizes that everyone will now believe that he is Belle's killer; everyone, that is, except for the guilty man, whose identity he will never know.

== Reception ==
When Belle was published in English in 1954, many of the citizens of Lakeville were displeased at how they and their town had been depicted in the novel, though a few were amused to recognize themselves in some of the characters. Some of the townsfolk went so far as to let Simenon know of their displeasure, causing a rift between him and his neighbors.

A reviewer in The Lakeville Journal wrote “ . . . [Belle] takes place in a town so similar to Lakeville that the post office and Hugo's store are recognizable . . . But how many Americans will see themselves in these scenes?”

Henry Miller found the depiction of New England in Belle to be very accurate, and added in a letter to Simenon that "New England gives me the shudders."

== Adaptations ==
In France, Belle was filmed twice, first as La Mort de Belle in 1961 (known as The Passion of Slow Fire in the US), and then as a TV movie entitled Jusqu'à l'Enfer in 2009. A TV movie was also made of the book in Germany as Bellas Tod in 1979, and was filmed in Lakeville, twenty-three years after Simenon and his family had lived there.

Another French adaptation of the novel, Belle, scheduled for release in 2024, is directed by Benoît Jacquot and stars Guillaume Canet and Charlotte Gainsbourg. however due to sexual abuse allegations against Jacquot, Canet distanced from the film and it remains unreleased.
