= The Disappearance of Odile =

Novel by Georges Simenon

- Cover of the 1st French edition
- Author: Georges Simenon
- Original title: La disparition d'Odile
- Translator: Lyn Moir
- Language: French
- Set in: Lausanne, Paris
- Publisher: Club français du livre
- Publication date: 1971
- English publication date: 1972

La disparition d'Odile (translated as The Disappearance of Odile, 1971) is a novel by Belgian writer Georges Simenon; it is one of the author's self-described roman durs, or more literary "hard novels," to distinguish it from his romans populaires or "popular novels," which are primarily mysteries that usually feature his famous Inspector Maigret character.

La disparition d'Odile was translated into English by Lyn Moir for Hamish Hamilton and Harcourt Brace Jovanovich in 1972.

== Background and composition ==
The character of Odile was clearly inspired by Simenon's daughter, Marie-Jo, who suffered from manic depression, and was deeply affected by the violent quarrels that frequently flared up between her mother and father. Despite the novel's optimistic ending—a definite rarity within the author's oeuvre—Marie-Jo committed suicide two years later after a number of other unsuccessful attempts.

The book was completed in Epalinges on 4 October 1970.

Before appearing in book form in editions by Club français du livre and Presses de la Cité, the work was serialized in La Gazette de Lausanne over the course of forty issues, from 5 December 1970 to 23 January 1971.

== Plot summary ==
Odile Pointet is an eighteen-year-old girl from Lausanne who feels uncomfortable in her own skin. She has had many empty and meaningless love affairs, and is tired of living with her father, a successful writer who only thinks about his books, and her mother, who does nothing but drink and host bridge parties.

Odile decides to leave Lausanne for Paris, but is not merely running away: she takes with her her father's revolver and some sleeping pills, intending to commit suicide. She leaves a letter for her brother Bob explaining her intentions, and after reading it he sets off in search of his sister.

In Paris, Odile stays in a number of hotel rooms of varying quality. She sleeps most of the day, and at night frequents the Saint-Germain-des-Prés district. Odile has an intense but short-lived affair, after which she decides the time has come for her to end her life. She writes a second letter to Bob in which she explains her inability to form a lasting relationship with a man. She then slits her wrist in the bathtub.

She is saved by a medical student named Albert Galabar, who hears Odile screaming as she is cutting her wrist. Comforted by the young man's tenderness and care, she regains a taste for life. Suspecting that her brother has been searching for her, Odile meets him at a hotel on the Rue Gay-Lussac, where her family used to stay. Bob contacts his parents to let them know he has found his sister, and the two return to Lausanne.

But Odile still feels ill at ease at home. She finds the family atmosphere to be oppressive, and once again she leaves for Paris, where she returns to her hotel room and Albert Galabar, to whom she entrusts her father's revolver. Odile looks forward to finding a job and having a life of her own.

== Reception ==
In his biography of Simenon, Pierre Assouline writes: "La Disparition d’Odile is a frightful portrait of father and daughter, especially in view of the context in which it was written and its fictionalized self-criticism."

An anonymous reviewer writing for Kirkus Reviews opines: "A very frugal psychological study, not lackadaisical so much as listless . . . M. Simenon recites all this in a flatly declarative fashion as if his heart weren't in it and his very good mind were elsewhere."
