= Madame Maigret's Own Case =

1950 novel by Georges Simenon

- Author: Georges Simenon
- Original title: French: L'Amie de madame Maigret
- Translator: Helen Sebba, Howard Curtis
- Language: French
- Series: Inspector Jules Maigret
- Genre: Detective fiction, crime fiction
- Publisher: Presses de la Cité
- Publication date: 1950
- Publication place: Belgium
- English publication date: 1959
- Media type: Print
- Preceded by: Maigret and the Old Lady
- Followed by: Maigret's Memoirs

Madame Maigret's Own Case (French: L'Amie de madame Maigret) is a 1950 detective novel by Belgian writer Georges Simenon, featuring his character inspector Jules Maigret. The novel was written between December 13 and 22, 1949 in Carmel-by-the-Sea, California. The book was published the following year by Presses de la Cité publishers.

== Translations ==
The book was translated into English by Helen Sebba in 1959 as Madame Maigret's Own Case. The novel was also published in 1960 and in 2003 under the titles Madame Maigret's Friend and The Friend of Madame Maigret, respectively. The book was translated again in 2016 by Howard Curtis as Madame Maigret's Friend .

The first German translation by Hansjürgen Wille and Barbara Klau was published by Kiepenheuer & Witsch in 1954. A new translation by Roswitha Plancherel was published by Diogenes Verlag in 1979.

== Reception ==
The New York Times found the novel to be "more police procedure than usual" with Inspector Maigret acting "less like a lone wolf and more like a police executive". The plot was also said to be "intricate" and "hard to follow; but... one of the better Simenons in tone and color."

== Adaptations ==
The novel has been adapted several times:

In English

- 1962: The White Hat, starring Rupert Davies;

In Dutch

- 1965: De vriendin van mevrouw Maigret, starring Kees Brusse.

In French

- 1977: L'Amie de Madame Maigret, with Jean Richard in the lead role;

In Japanese

- 1978: Keishi to kōen no onna (警視と公園の女: Woman in the Park), starring Kinya Aikawa

== Bibliography ==
- Maurice Piron, Michel Lemoine, L'Univers de Simenon, guide des romans et nouvelles (1931–1972) de Georges Simenon, Presses de la Cité, 1983, p. 320-321 ISBN 978-2-258-01152-6 (in French)
