= The Grand Banks Café =

1931 detective novel by Georges Simenon

- Author: Georges Simenon
- Original title: (Fr.) Au Rendezvous des Terre-Neuvas
- Language: French
- Series: Inspector Jules Maigret
- Genre: Detective fiction
- Publisher: A. Fayard
- Publication date: 1931
- Publication place: France
- Media type: Print
- Preceded by: A Crime in Holland
- Followed by: A Man's Head

The Grand Banks Café (French: Au rendezvous des Terre-Neuvas, "The Meeting-place of the Newfoundlanders" (Note: The term Terre-nuevas, (fr) "Newfoundlanders", refers to the fishermen who worked France's deep-sea trawlers to the Grand Banks fishery off the coast of Newfoundland up to the end of the 20th century.)) is a detective novel by Belgian writer Georges Simenon, featuring his character Detective Chief Inspector Maigret of the Paris judicial police. First published in French in 1931, it has been translated into English twice and adapted for television three times. The novel concerns Maigret's unofficial investigation of the murder of the captain of a fishing trawler in Fécamp.

== Plot summary ==
A childhood friend asks Detective Chief Inspector Maigret of the Paris judicial police to conduct an unofficial investigation of a murder in Fécamp. The victim is Octave Fallut, captain of the trawler the Océan, that has just returned from a fishing expedition to the Grand Banks off Newfoundland. Soon after docking, Captain Fallut had let the crew go ashore. When he disembarked some time later, he was strangled and thrown into the water. Pierre Le Clinche, the Océan's young wireless operator, was the only crew member at the scene and was arrested for the murder.

Maigret, who is on holiday, goes to Fécamp with Madame Maigret. He visits The Grand Banks Café, where the crew of the Océan drink, and learns that the trawler's voyage was dogged by trouble, including the erratic behaviour of the captain and the drowning of the cabin boy after three days at sea. There was also tension between the captain and Le Clinche.

Le Clinche's fiancée, Marie Léonnec, goes with Maigret to visit Le Clinche in jail. Le Clinche admits that he was at the scene and claims that he saw a man with tan shoes fighting the captain. Maigret questions others and learns that the captain probably had a secret lover in Le Havre. A photograph of a young woman is found in Le Clinche's belongings. The woman's head has been scratched out.

While drinking at a hotel, Maigret witnesses a man named Gaston arguing with a woman named Adèle, and he recognises the woman's figure and clothing from the photograph. The couple leave in a car, and Maigret asks the local police to find them. Later, Maigret and Marie investigate the Océan, where Marie finds evidence that a woman had been hidden in the captain's cabin.

Maigret questions Gaston and Adèle. Adèle says she is Gaston's girlfriend and was the captain's lover. The captain insisted she hide in his cabin for the fishing expedition. Le Clinche found out she was there and they had sex once. When the Océan returned to Fécamp, the captain told her to wait in the cabin until he could safely bring her out. Gaston was on the dock waiting for Adèle and saw a man attack the captain. Le Clinche arrived and let her out the cabin and off the ship when no one was looking.

Le Clinche is brought in to confront Gaston and Adèle but he refuses to identify Gaston, who is wearing tan shoes, as the killer. On his way back to his cell, he snatches a policeman's pistol but is prevented from shooting himself. All three are soon released on condition they remain in Fécamp until the case is closed. That afternoon, the Maigrets, Le Clinche and Marie are having drinks when Gaston and Adèle arrive and sit at the next table. After Adèle taunts Le Clinche and Marie, Le Clinche shoots himself with a pistol he had hidden in his pocket. He is taken to hospital in a critical condition.

Maigret goes to The Grand Banks Café where Canut, the father of the dead cabin boy, curses the crew of the Océan and wishes them all dead. Maigret visits Le Clinche in hospital. Le Clinche admits that on the third day of the voyage he saw the captain arguing with the cabin boy because the cabin boy had discovered Adèle on board and threatened to tell someone. The captain accidentally killed the cabin boy then threw the body overboard.

The tension between the captain and Le Clinche increased when Le Clinche slept with Adèle the following day and the captain found out about it. Le Clinche became obsessed with Adèle, and when the Océan arrived in Fécamp, he told Canut that the captain had killed his son. He saw Canut kill the captain then he went aboard to let Adèle out of the cabin. When she disembarked, she embraced Gaston who was waiting for her at the dock. Thinking that he had lost both Adèle and Marie, Le Clinche fell into despair.

Maigret does not reveal the identity of the killer and the Le Havre police close the investigation. Le Clinche and Marie eventually marry and have children.

== Other titles ==
The novel was originally published in French in 1931 under the title Au Rendez-vous des Terre-Neuvas by Fayard in Paris. The book has been translated twice into English: In 1940, by Margaret Ludwig as The Sailor's Rendezvous (and reprinted as Maigret Answers a Plea in 1942) and again in 2014 by David Coward as The Grand Banks Café.

== Adaptations ==
The story has been adapted for television three times: in English in 1963, with Rupert Davies in the main role; in Dutch in 1967 with Jan Teulings as Maigret and in French in 1977 with Jean Richard in the lead role.

== Works cited ==
- Young, Trudee (1976). Georges Simenon, a checklist of his 'Maigret' and other mystery novels and short stories in French and in English translations. Metuchen, N.J.: The Scarecrow Press. ISBN 0-8108-0964-8.

== Notes and references ==
Notes

Citations
