= Maigret Has Scruples =

Novel by Georges Simenon

- First edition
- Author: Georges Simenon
- Language: French
- Publisher: Presses de la Cite
- Publication date: 25 June 1958

Maigret Has Scruples (French: Les Scrupules de Maigret) is a detective novel by the Belgian writer Georges Simenon featuring his character Jules Maigret.

== Synopsis ==
On one of those rare days when all is quiet at the Quai des Orfèvres Maigret receives a visit from the mild-mannered toy salesman (at the Magasins du Louvre) Xavier Marton. Marton thinks that either his wife is trying to poison him or he is just crazy. Then Mme. Marton also shows up leaving Maigret rather bemused. Worried about his own wife's health and musing over his marriage, Maigret decides to investigate despite an order from the public prosecutor not to. When a body finally shows up, the reality is a surprise to everyone.

== Publication history ==
The French title was first published by Presses de la Cite in Paris on 25 June 1958.

The first English version appeared in 1959 as Maigret has scruples and was published by Hamish Hamilton. Robert Eglesfield was the translator for this and all subsequent English versions.

The first American version appeared in a two-book volume (with Maigret and the Reluctant Witness) entitled Versus Inspector Maigret published by Doubleday.

== Adaptations ==
A French film version of the book with Bruno Cremer and directed by Pierre Joassin appeared in 2003.

An English language TV version was broadcast on 7 November 1960 with Rupert Davies as Maigret.

A TV version was first broadcast on 27 November 1976 with Jean Richard as Maigret. The episode was a part of the series Les Enquêtes du Commissaire Maigret.

An English BBC Radio play based on the book was first broadcast on 4 September 1976. Maurice Denham played Maigret.
