= Maigret and the Mad Woman =

1970 novel by Georges Simenon

- First edition
- Author: Georges Simenon
- Original title: La folle de Maigret
- Language: French
- Series: Inspector Jules Maigret
- Release number: 72
- Genre: Detective fiction
- Publisher: Presses de la Cité
- Publication date: 1970
- Media type: Print
- Preceded by: Maigret and the Wine Merchant
- Followed by: Maigret and the Loner

Maigret and the Mad Woman (French title: La Folle de Maigret is a 1970 detective novel by the Belgian writer Georges Simenon featuring his character Jules Maigret. Written in Épalinges, Switzerland, it was translated by Eileen Ellenbogen. Published by Presses de la Cité on 7 May 1970, it is the 100th in the series.

== Synopsis ==
Maigret regrets his folly in dismissing an old lady whom he had taken to be paranoid. She claims she was about to be murdered by someone who had surreptitiously entered her apartment. Her claim proves correct. It has been considered one of the better of the derivative late Maigrets for its particularly evocative atmosphere and sense of place.

== Adaptations ==
=== Television ===
- Jean Richard, Dir. Claude Boissol Antenne 2, 17 March 1975.
- Michael Gambon, Dir. John Glenister, Granada TV, 2 March 1992.

== Gallery ==
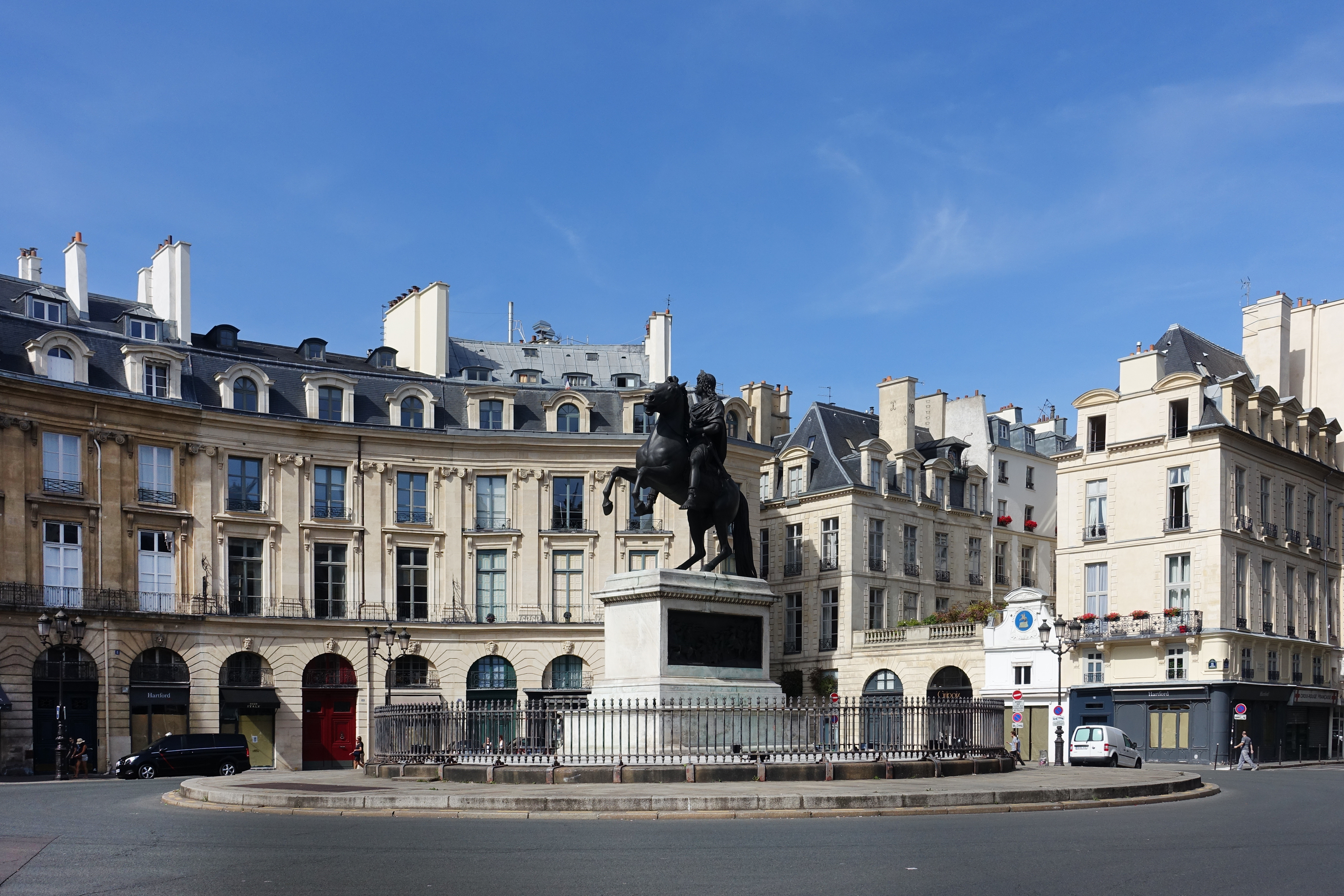
Place des Victoires

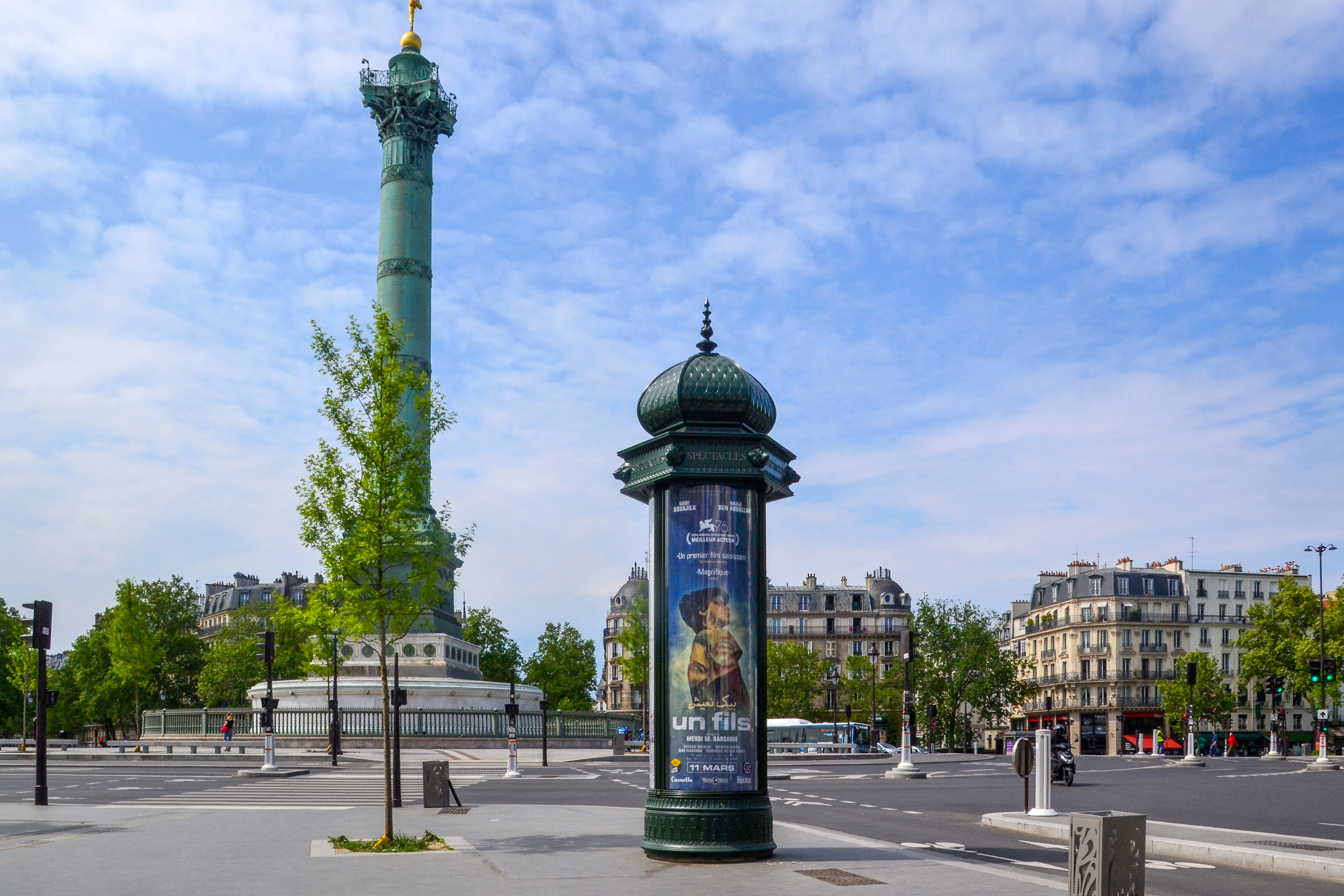
Place de la Bastille

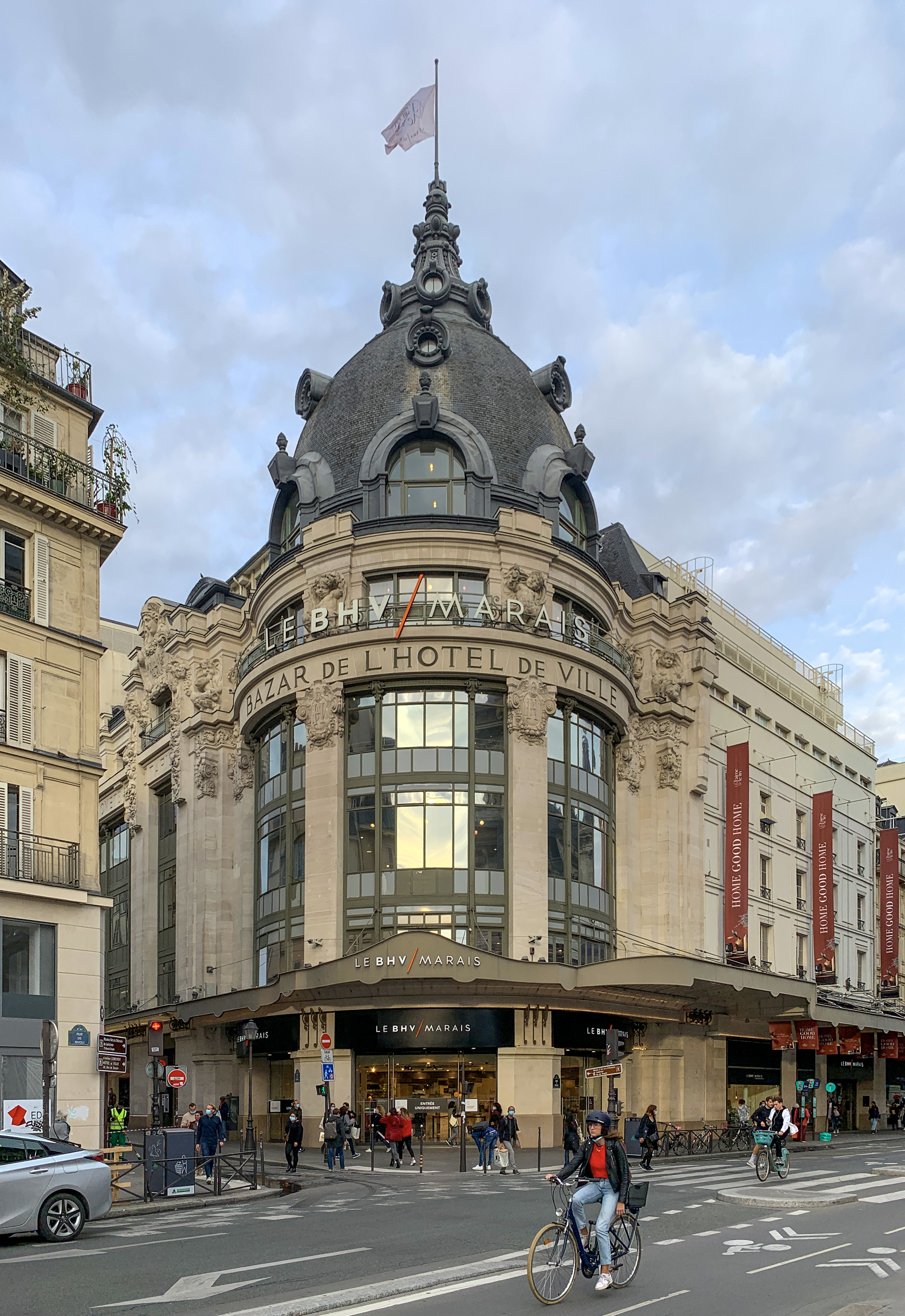
Bazar de l'Hôtel de Ville

Pont Neuf

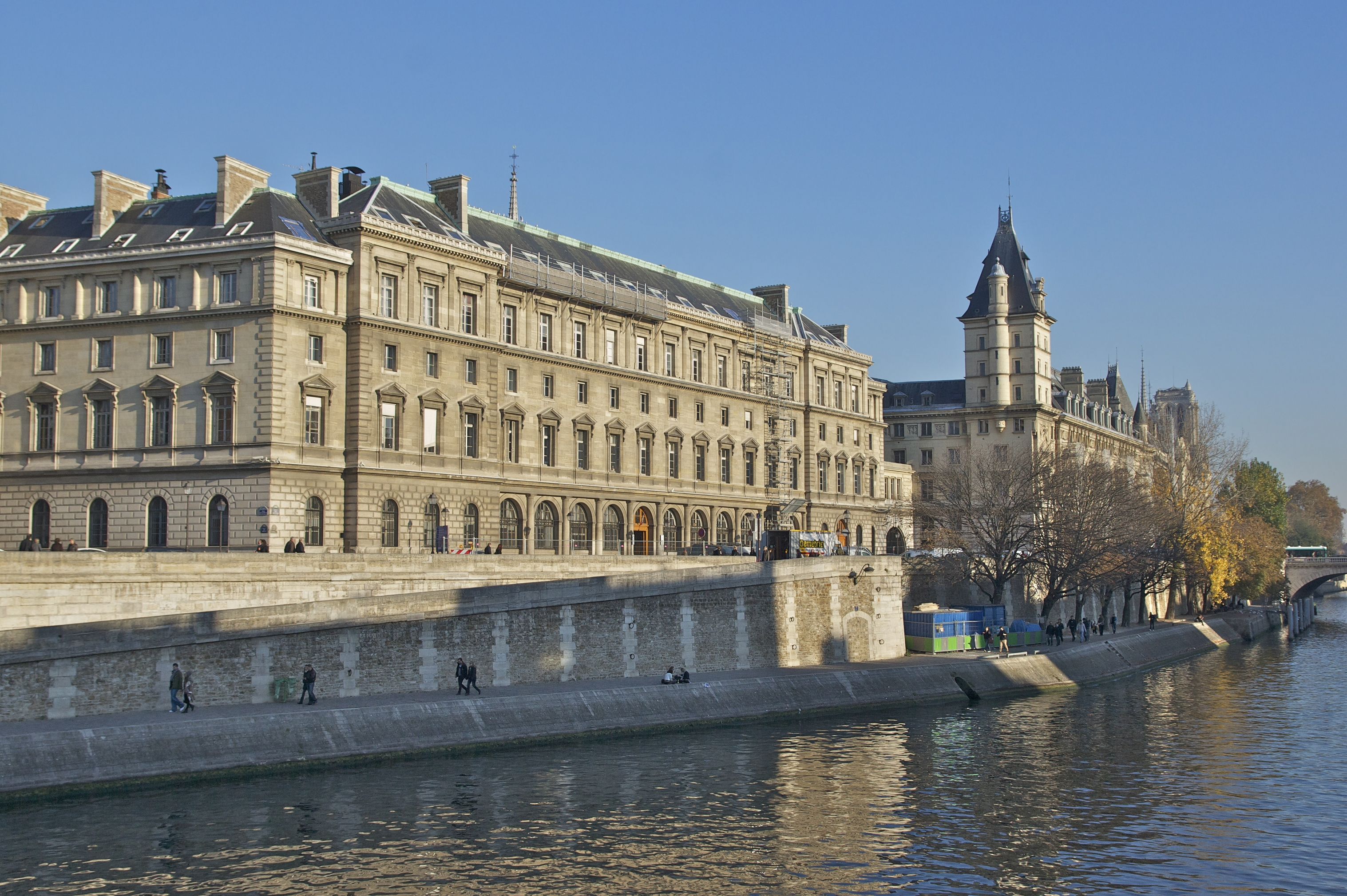
36 Quai des Orfèvres

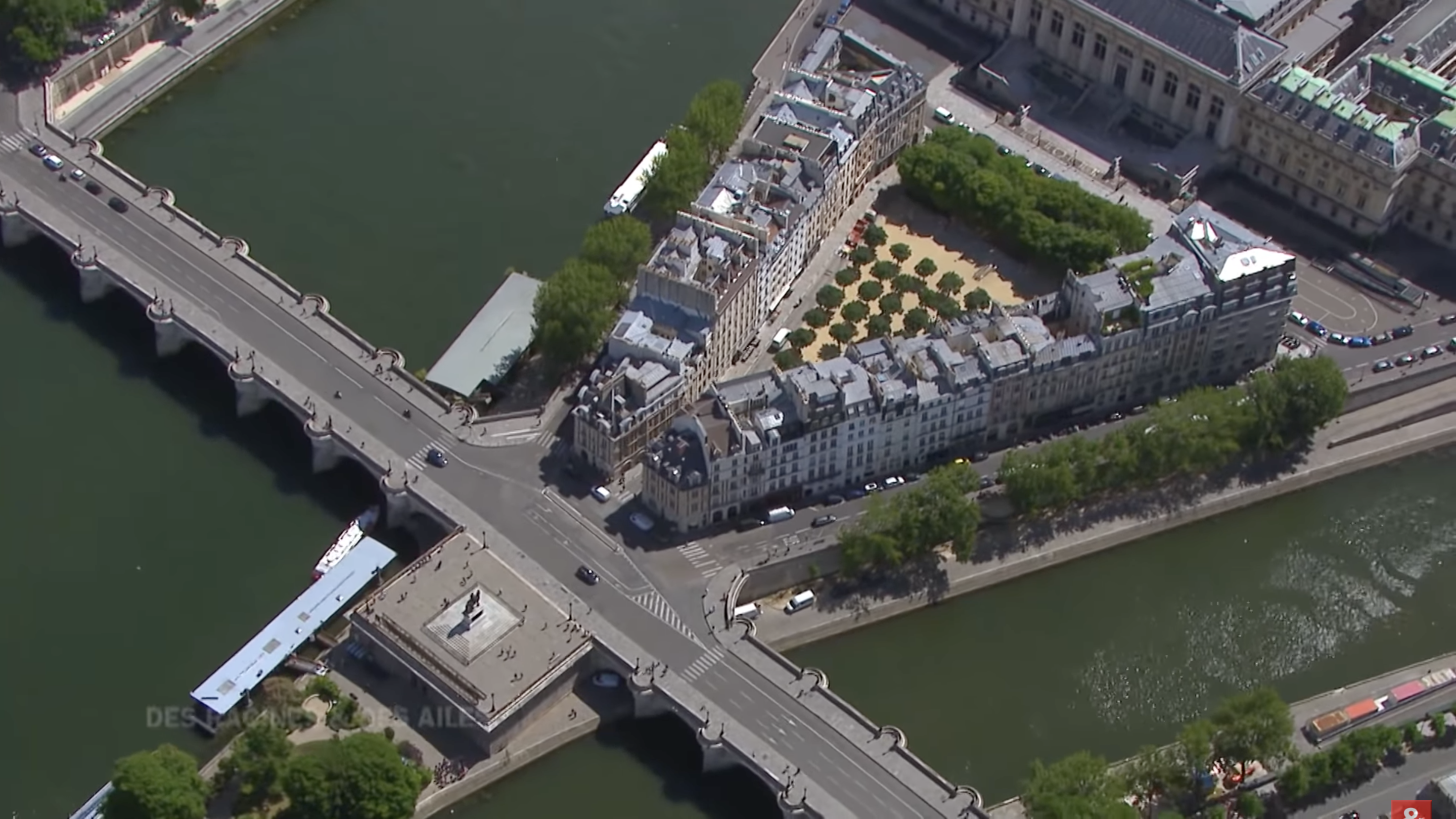
Place Dauphine

== See also ==
- Analyses (English & French)
