= Maigret and the Loner =

1971 novel

- Author: Georges Simenon
- Original title: Maigret et l'homme tout seul
- Translator: Howard Curtis
- Language: French
- Genre: Detective fiction
- Publication date: 1971
- Media type: Print
- Preceded by: Maigret and the Mad Woman
- Followed by: Maigret and the Informer

Maigret and the Loner (French: Maigret et l'homme tout seul) is a 1971 detective novel by the Belgian writer Georges Simenon featuring his character Jules Maigret. The book has been translated into English by Howard Curtis and Eileen Ellenbogen. Written at a time of severe family crises, it explores the nature of solitude and the whys and wherefores of those who chose to live outside society, common themes for Simenon. Maigret and the Loner shares the distinction of being one of only three novels in the Maigret canon which include explicit dates, the others being The Late Monsieur Gallet and Maigret's First Case. It was written at Épalinges, Switzerland 24-30 January 1968.

== Synopsis ==
A male vagrant is found shot dead in a condemned house in Les Halles, the central fresh fish market in the 1st arrondissement of Paris. He proves to be one Marcel Vivien, who had abruptly abandoned his family thirty years before for a twenty-year-old woman, leaving them destitute. Six months later he strangles her for being unfaithful. Another man, Louis Mahossier, knowing he had killed her, vows revenge. Marcel Vivien goes totally incommunicado, an anonymous, almost mute drifter until Mahossier comes crosses paths with him by chance and carries out his decades-old vow. After sleeping rough for thirty years and maintaining almost total social isolation, Vivien appears much older than his 55 years. Maigret solves the case both by interviewing numerous elderly throughout Montmartre for a week, and with the help of an anonymous tip.

== Adaptations ==
=== Television ===
- Kinya Aikawa, 警視とひとりぼっちの男 (Solitary Man), Dir. Fukumoto Yoshito, ABC, 28 July 1978
- Jean Richard, Antenne 2, 8 February 1982
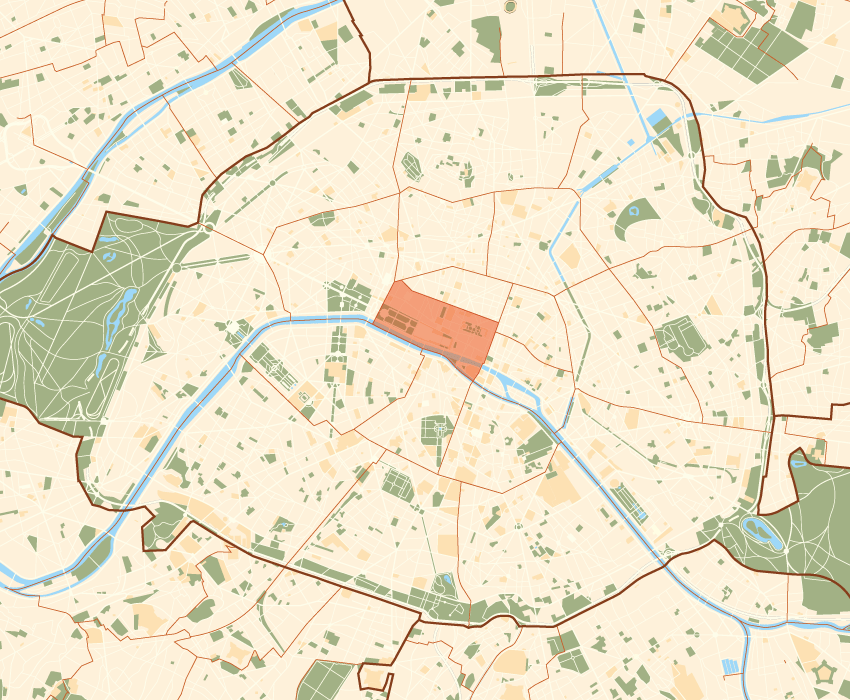
1st arrondissement

Quarters

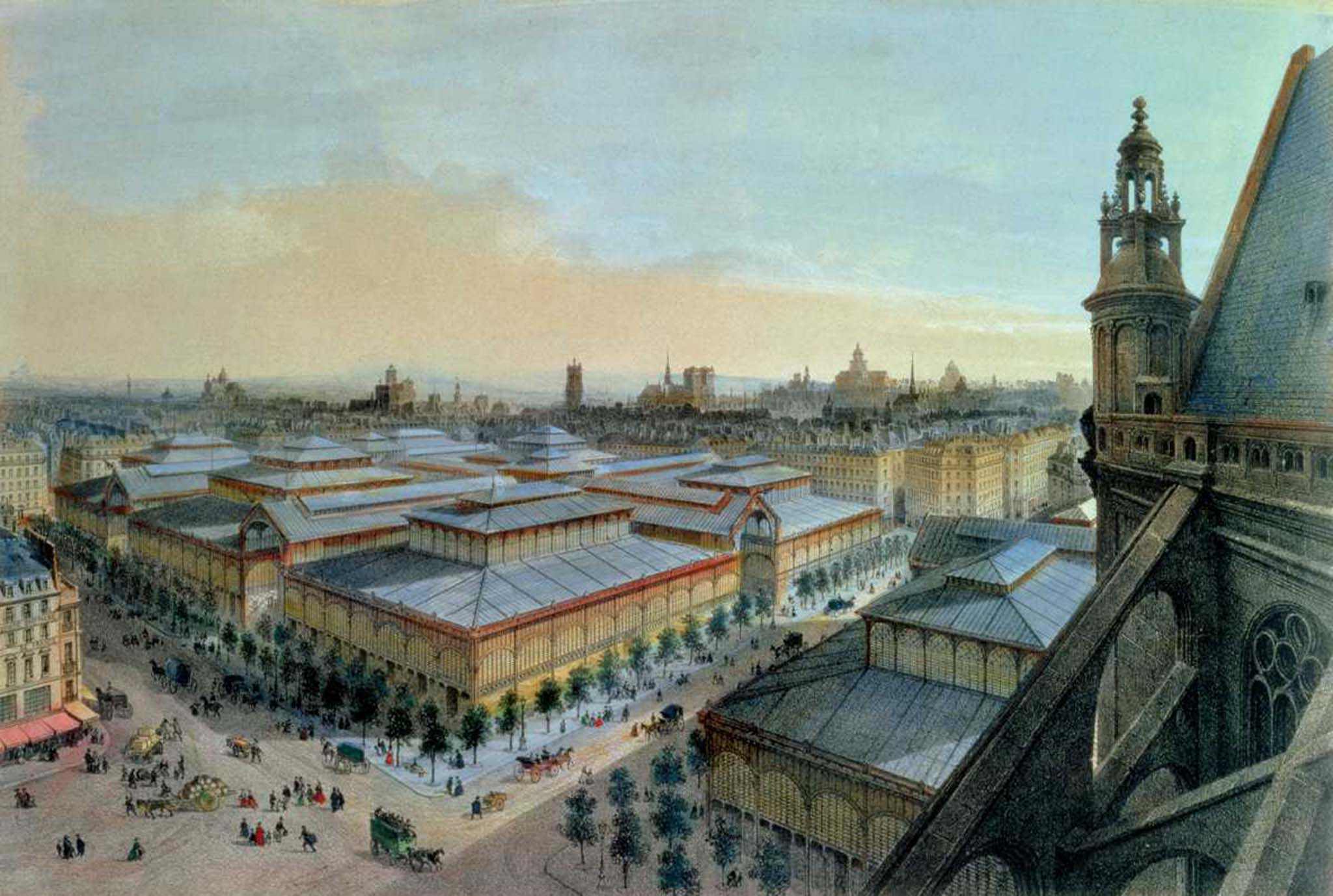
Southeast view from Saint-Eustache cathedral, 1870
