= Maigret and the Hotel Majestic =

1942 detective novel by Georges Simenon

- Author: Georges Simenon
- Original title: Les caves du majestic
- Translator: Caroline Hillier
- Language: French
- Series: Inspector Jules Maigret
- Genre: Detective fiction
- Publication date: 15 October 1942
- English publication date: 1977
- Media type: Print
- Preceded by: Cecile is Dead
- Followed by: Maigret in Exile

Maigret and the Hotel Majestic (French: Les Caves du Majestic) is a 1942 detective novel by the Belgian writer Georges Simenon featuring his character Jules Maigret.

The novel was first published in serial form in the weekly magazine Marianne in 1940. It first appeared in book form in the collection Maigret Returns (French: Maigret Revient) in October 1942 published by Gallimard.

This novel was first published in English in 1977 by Hamish Hamilton (London) and Harcourt Brace Jovanovich (New York), translated by Caroline Hillier, later also published under the title The Hotel Majestic. In 2015, this novel was reissued in English under the title The Cellars of the Majestic, newly translated by Howard Curtis (ISBN 9780241188446).

== Synopsis ==
The body of a rich woman is found hidden in an employee locker at the upscale Hotel Majestic. While she has been murdered, none of her expensive belongings have been taken and there are few clues to be found. As detective Jules Maigret begins investigating her death, his interviews with hotel staff start to reveal the secret double life the woman was leading. As more information is revealed, Maigret suspects that one of these employees holds the clue that will unlock the mystery of her death.

== Adaptations ==
It has one major big-screen adaptation. It was filmed in 1945 as Majestic Hotel Cellars starring Albert Préjean as Maigret.

It has been adapted for television on four occasions: In 1963 it was made into an episode of BBC's Maigret starring Rupert Davies (It aired as the fourth episode of the fourth season).

In 1987 it was made into an episode of the long-running French series Les Enquêtes du commissaire Maigret starring Jean Richard. (It aired as episode No. 73.)

In 1993 it was adapted twice, first for the French-language international production of Maigret starring Bruno Cremer, airing in its second season. Also in 1993, it was featured on British TV as an episode of the ITV drama Maigret starring Michael Gambon. (It aired as the second episode of the second season.)
