= The Judge's House (novel) =

1942 detective novel by Georges Simenon

- Author: Georges Simenon
- Original title: La maison du juge
- Translator: Eileen Ellenbogen
- Language: French
- Series: Inspector Jules Maigret
- Genre: Detective fiction
- Publication date: 1942
- Media type: Print
- Preceded by: Maigret and the Hotel Majestic
- Followed by: Maigret and the Spinster

The Judge's House (French: La maison du juge), also known as Maigret in Exile, is a 1942 detective novel by the Belgian writer Georges Simenon, featuring his character Detective Chief Inspector Maigret of the French Judicial Police. Maigret launches an investigation following the discovery of a dead man in the home of a retired judge in a small coastal village in the Vendée region of France. First published in French, the novel has been translated into English twice and adapted for television three times.

== Plot ==
Detective Chief Inspector Maigret of the French Judicial Police has been transferred to Luçon in the Vendée region. He travels to the coastal village of L'Augillon to investigate reports of a corpse seen in the home of Judge Forlacroix, a retired justice of the peace from Versailles. That night he sees Forlacroix trying to dispose of a body.

Forlacroix explains that he did not kill the man: he found the body in his home and has no idea who he was. He had been playing cards with friends in the library downstairs. When he went upstairs to go to bed he found his son, Albert, sitting at the top of the stairs. They had a brief conversation before Albert went home. The following morning Forlacroix found a body in a room upstairs he calls "the fruitery". The fruitery adjoins the bedroom of his daughter, Lise, who he locks in her room at night because she is a sleepwalker. He decided to throw the body into the sea to avoid complications.

Maigret finds fresh muddy footprints in Lise's room, which Albert says are those of Marcel Airaud, a fellow mussel farmer. Marcel admits that he was at Forlacroix's home the previous night but not on the night of the murder.

Forlacroix tells Maigret that Lise has bouts of madness, and he is afraid people will let their imaginations run wild. Marcel flees to the marshes around Marans, and Maigret orders the police to search for him. A local woman tells Maigret that Marcel is in love with Lise but does not take advantage of her the way other men do. She explains that men can easily get into Lise's room by climbing the terrace and entering through the window of the fruitery.

The dead man is identified as Dr Janin, a psychiatrist from Nantes. Forlacroix denies knowing Janin but confesses that 15 years earlier he killed his own wife's lover and cemented the body into a disused well on his property in Versailles. Maigret and Forlacroix take Lise to a nursing home. Maigret then arrests Forlacroix and goes to the property in Versailles where he finds a skeleton in the well.

Maigret learns that Marcel had known Janin in the navy. He tells the examining magistate that Forlacroix consulted doctors about his daughter's condition and was told that it was likely to get worse and it would be wise to marry her off. Forlacroix and Marcel agreed Marcel would marry Lise in two month's time. Maigret speculates that Marcel wanted to be certain about Lise's mental health, so he consulted Janin.

Maigret learns that Albert has given Marcel shelter on his property, so he puts Marcel under surveillance. Albert tells Maigret he has long been estranged from Forlacroix and knew from the age of 16 that he was not his biological father. Marcel was once his friend, but they had a falling out when he discovered Marcel was having sex with his sister.

Maigret suggests to Albert that he and Marcel arranged for Janin to secretly examine Lise, sneaking upstairs while Forlacroix was playing cards in the library. Albert admits that he has keys to Forlacroix's front door and Lise's room but says he was only at Forlacroix's home for five to ten minutes on the night of the murder.

Maigret discovers that Lise is pregnant and that Marcel had been seen waiting outside Forlacroix's house just before midnight on the night of the murder. He has Marcel arrested and questions him, telling him he knows that Albert went to Lise's room with Janin, leaving Marcel waiting outside Forlacroix's home. He suggests the doctor examined Lise then told Albert in the fruitery that Lise was pregnant and incurably insane.

Maigret calls Albert back in to confront Marcel. Albert denies killing Janin, saying it was Lise. But Maigret accuses Albert of killing Janin in a rage and suggests he is mad like his sister. Albert charges at Maigret, but Marcel wrestles him to the ground. The police handcuff Albert. Marcel confirms that Albert had told him that Lise had killed Janin, so he had fled to divert suspicion from her.

== Publication history ==
The novel was first published in French in 1942 as La maison du juge (the judge's house) in a collection of three Maigret novels entitled Maigret revient (Maigret returns). The collection also included Cecile est morte (Maigret and the Spinster) and Les caves du Majestic (Maigret and the Hotel Majestic). These were the first new Maigret novels published in eight years, and the first published by the Nouvelle Revue Française (Gallimard).

The novel was first translated into English by Eileen Ellenbogen and published in 1978 as Maigret in Exile by Hamish Hamilton in the United Kingdom. A new translation by Howard Curtis was published in 2015 as The Judge's House by Penguin Books in the United Kingdom and in 2026 by Macmillan Publishers in the United States.

== Background ==
Simenon intended that his novel Maigret, published in 1934, would be the final one featuring the detective. However, at the insistence of Gallimard, his new publisher, he revived the character in a series of short stories written from 1936 to 1939. He began a new Maigret novel, Les caves du Majestic (Maigret and the Hotel Majestic) in December 1939. La maison du juge (The Judge's House) followed in January 1940, although it was not published as a book until October 1942.

== Adaptations ==
The novel has been adapted for television three times. An episode entitled "The Judge's House" for BBC's television program Maigret aired on 26 November 1963, with Rupert Davies playing Maigret. A French television version with Jean Richard as Maigret aired on 1 February 1969. A second French television version with Bruno Cremer in the lead role aired on 15 March 1992.
