= Maigret and the Toy Village =

1944 novel by Georges Simenon

- Author: Georges Simenon
- Original title: French: Félicie est là
- Translator: Eileen Ellenbogen, David Coward
- Language: French
- Series: Inspector Jules Maigret
- Genre: Detective fiction, Crime fiction
- Publisher: Gallimard
- Publication date: 1944
- Publication place: Belgium
- English publication date: 1978
- Media type: Print
- Preceded by: To Any Lengths
- Followed by: Maigret's Rival

Maigret and the Toy Village (other English-language title is Félicie; French: Félicie est là) is a detective novel by Belgian writer Georges Simenon, featuring his character inspector Jules Maigret.

== Translations ==
The book has been translated two times into English: in 1978 as Maigret and the Toy Village by Eileen Ellenbogen and in 2015 as Félicie by David Coward.

== Adaptations ==
The novel has been adapted several times for cinema and television:

In French

- 1968: as Félicie est là, Season 2, Episode 4 of the television series Les Enquêtes du commissaire Maigret, directed by Claude Barma, with Jean Richard as Inspector Maigret;
- 2002: as La Maison de Félicie, with Bruno Cremer;

In English

- 1962: as Love from Felicie, with Rupert Davies;
- 1993: as Maigret and the Maid with Michael Gambon

In Japanese

- 1978: as Keishi to gārufurendo (警視とガールフレンド), with Kinya Aikawa in Maigret's role;

In Dutch

- 1968: as Maigret en het meisje voor dag en nacht, with Jan Teulings.

== Literature ==
- Maurice Piron, Michel Lemoine, L'Univers de Simenon, guide des romans et nouvelles (1931-1972) de Georges Simenon, Presses de la Cité, 1983, p. 302-303 ISBN 978-2-258-01152-6 (in French)
