= Maigret and the Old Lady =

1950 novel by Georges Simenon

- Author: Georges Simenon
- Original title: French: Maigret et la Vieille Dame
- Translator: Robert Brain, Ros Schwartz
- Language: French
- Series: Inspector Jules Maigret
- Genre: Detective fiction, crime fiction
- Publisher: Presses de la Cité
- Publication date: 28 February 1950
- Publication place: Belgium
- English publication date: 1958
- Media type: Print
- Preceded by: Maigret and the Coroner
- Followed by: Madame Maigret's Own Case

Maigret and the Old Lady (French: Maigret et la vieille dame) is a detective novel by Belgian writer Georges Simenon, featuring his character inspector Jules Maigret. The novel was written between November 29 to December 8, 1949, in Carmel-by-the-Sea, United States. The book was published the following year by Presses de la Cité.

== Translations ==
The book was translated into English by Robert Brain in 1958 and by Ros Schwartz in 2016 under the title Maigret and the Old Lady.

The first German translation by Hansjürgen Wille and Barbara Klau was published by Kiepenheuer & Witsch in 1954. The new translation by Renate Nickel was published by Diogenes Verlag in 1978.

== Reception ==
In 1958 literature magazine Time and Tide wrote about the novel: "The plot of Maigret and the Old Lady […] might not amount to much if it were handled by another, but Maigret's methods and Simenon's gift for creating and evoking local atmosphere combine to hold the reader captive."

== Adaptations ==
The novel was adapted several times:

In French

- 1977: Maigret et la dame d'Etretat, with Jean Richard in the lead role;
- 1995: Maigret et la vieille dame, starring Bruno Cremer;

In English

- 1960: The Old Lady, starring Rupert Davies;

In Japanese

- 1978: Keishi to rōfūfu no nazo (警視と老夫婦の謎)), starring Kinya Aikawa;

In Russian

- 1974: Maigret i staraya dama, starring Boris Tenin.

== Stage Play 1965 ==
Maigret and the Lady, Strand Theatre, London (now Novello Theatre, London), Opera House, Manchester, and other locations. August 23 – November 6, 1965. [John Gale Productions Ltd., https://theatricalia.com/play/eq3/maigret-and-the-lady/production/y4w ]

== Bibliography ==
- Maurice Piron, Michel Lemoine, L'Univers de Simenon, guide des romans et nouvelles (1931–1972) de Georges Simenon, Presses de la Cité, 1983, p. 318-319 ISBN 978-2-258-01152-6 (in French)
