= Maigret and the Spinster =

1942 novel by Georges Simenon

- Author: Georges Simenon
- Original title: French: Cécile est morte
- Translator: Eileen Ellenbogen, Anthea Bell
- Language: French
- Series: Inspector Jules Maigret
- Genre: Detective fiction, Crime fiction
- Publisher: Gallimard
- Publication date: 1942
- Publication place: Belgium
- English publication date: 1977
- Media type: Print
- Preceded by: Maigret in Exile
- Followed by: To Any Lengths

Maigret and the Spinster (other English-language title is Cécile is Dead; French: Cécile est morte) is a detective novel by Belgian writer Georges Simenon, featuring his character inspector Jules Maigret.

== Plot ==
For six months Cècile tells the police that belongings in her rich spinster aunt's bedroom have been subtly moved, indicating tresspass. Maigret dutifully takes down these reports, but deems that there is nothing to investigate. Until one day he leaves her in the hall of the police station unseen, and the next day she is found dead.

== Other titles ==
The book has been translated two times into English: in 1977 as Maigret and the Spinster translated by Eileen Ellenbogen and in 2015 as Cécile is Dead translated by Anthea Bell.

== Adaptations ==
The novel has been adapted seven times for cinema and television:

In French

- 1944: as Cécile est morte, with Albert Prejean in the main role;
- 1955: as Maigret dirige l'enquête, with Maurice Manson;
- 1967: as Cécile est morte, with Jean Richard in the lead role;
- 1994: as Cécile est morte, with Bruno Cremer;

In Italian

- 1964: as Un'ombra su Maigret, with Gino Cervi in the main role;

In English

- 1963: as Poor Cecile!, with Rupert Davies;

In Russian

- 1969: as Смерть Сесили, with Boris Tenin in the lead role.

== Literature ==
- Maurice Piron, Michel Lemoine, L'Univers de Simenon, guide des romans et nouvelles (1931-1972) de Georges Simenon, Presses de la Cité, 1983, p. 292-293 ISBN 978-2-258-01152-6 (in French)
