= The Carter of 'La Providence' =

Novel by Georges Simenon

- Author: Georges Simenon
- Original title: French: Le Charretier de la Providence
- Language: French
- Series: Inspector Jules Maigret
- Genre: Detective fiction
- Publisher: A. Fayard
- Publication date: 1931
- Publication place: France
- Media type: Print
- Preceded by: The Hanged Man of Saint-Pholien
- Followed by: The Yellow Dog

The Carter of 'La Providence' (Fr. Le Charretier de La Providence) is a detective novel by the Belgian writer Georges Simenon featuring his character Detective Chief Inspector Maigret of the judicial police. The novel involves Maigret's investigation of the murder of a woman found strangled in a stable near a lock on the Marne Canal.

The novel was the second of Simenon's Inspector Maigret series to have been written, and the third to have been published as a book. It has been translated into English three times and adapted for film and television four times.

== Plot summary ==
Detective Chief Inspector Maigret of the Paris judicial police is called to a crime scene at Lock 14 on the Marne Canal, near Dizy, when a woman's body is found in the stable of an inn near the lock. She had been strangled and was wearing expensive jewellery and stylish clothing. The woman is identified as Mary Lampson, wife of Sir Walter Lampson, an Englishman travelling through France on his yacht, the Southern Cross. Sir Walter does not appear upset by his wife's murder and says that he last saw her four days earlier at Meaux before she left the yacht without explanation. He did not report her disappearance because she sometimes did this. After waiting two days for her, he continued sailing the canals with his mistress Gloria and his crew members Vladimir and Willy.

Forensic analysis finds horsehairs and resin in Mary's hair. Maigret questions the crew of a barge, La Providence, that arrived at Lock 14 on the night Mary was killed. Monsieur and Madame Canelle own the barge and employ Jean, the carter who tends the two horses that tow the barge along the towpaths. Jean speaks little and reminds Maigret of a "village idiot". Maigret is told that Jean did not notice anything unusual on the night of the murder. Maigret notes that Jean sleeps with the horses in the stable that is treated with resin.

Two days later, Willy's body is found floating in the canal. He has been strangled to death. A Yacht Club de France badge belonging to Sir Walter is found in the grass where the body was thrown into the water. Maigret finds Vladimir's sailor's cap in the inn's stables and one of Willy's cufflinks nearby.

Maigret bicycles to Vitry-le-François where La Providence is now moored. He questions Jean and finds evidence that he had stolen a bicycle the night before and had ridden it a long distance. The following morning, Jean is found floating in the lock. He is rescued, but his ribs have been crushed between the barge and the wall of the lock. He is taken to hospital where the doctors expect him to die of his injuries within hours.

Jean disappears from the hospital overnight and Maigret finds him the following morning in the stable of La Providence. Maigret takes the dying man's fingerprints, and they are quickly matched to Jean Évariste Darchambeau, a medical doctor who was convicted of murdering his rich aunt and served 15 years in a penal colony in French Guiana. His wife, Céline Mornet, did not live up to her promise to follow him to Guiana. There he suffered a mental decline leaving him almost unable to speak

Maigret questions Jean who confirms that Mary was his former wife, Céline Mornet. He saw her on The Southern Cross at Meaux and took her aboard the barge, hiding her in the stable. When she tried to escape at Dizy he strangled her. After Maigret began questioning him, he stole a bicycle and rode back to Dizy to plant evidence incriminating the crew of The Southern Cross. Willy saw him planting the evidence, so he strangled Willy. Madame Canelle stays with Jean in the stable and talks to him as he dies. The Canelles go into town to buy clothes to wear to his funeral.

== Background ==
In the spring of 1929, Simenon set off for a tour of the rivers and canals of northern France, Belgium and Holland in his custom-built boat, the Ostrogoth. On his return to Paris in April 1930, Simenon completed Pietr-le-Letton, the first novel in which inspector Maigret of the Paris mobile crime brigade was a fully developed character. Simenon wrote the second official Inspector Maigret novel, Le charretier de 'La Providence', in the summer of 1930 when the Ostrogoth was moored at Morsang. The novel was the third of the series to be published as a book, following Monsieur Gallet, décédé and Le pendu de Saint-Pholien.

== Other titles ==
The novel was first published in French as Le charretier de 'La Providence' in Paris in 1931 by Fayard. The book has been translated three times into English: in 1934 by Anthony Abbot as The Crime at Lock 14, in 1963 by Robert Baldick as Maigret meets a Milord (reissued in 2003 as Lock 14), and in 2014 by David Coward as The Carter of 'La Providence'.

== Adaptations ==
The story has been adapted four times for film and television: in English in 1963 as The Crime at Lock 14, with Rupert Davies in the main role; in Japanese in 1978 as Keishi to Minami Jūjisei ("the Southern Cross") with Kinya Aikawa; in French in 1980 as Le Charretier de "La Providence" with Jean Richard, and again in 2001 as Maigret et la croqueuse de diamants ("Maigret and the gold-diggers (lit. "diamond eaters")", with Bruno Cremer.

== Bibliography ==
- Simenon, Georges (2014). The Carter of 'La Providence'. Translated by Coward, David. London: Penguin. ISBN 978 0 141 39346 9.
- Marnham, Patrick (1994). The Man Who Wasn't Maigret, A Portrait of Georges Simenon. Harcourt Brace & Company. ISBN 0-15-600059-8.
- Wenger, Murielle; Trussel, Stephen (2017). Maigret's World: A Reader's Companion to Simenon's Famous Detective. Jefferson, North Carolina: McFarland & Company. ISBN 978-1-4766-2925-4.
- Young, Trudee (1976). Georges Simenon, a checklist of his 'Maigret' and other mystery novels and short stories in French and in English translations. Metuchen, N.J.: The Scarecrow Press. ISBN 0-8108-0964-8.
