= Maigret's Memoirs =

1951 novel by Georges Simenon

- Author: Georges Simenon
- Original title: Les Mémoires de Maigret
- Translator: Jean Stewart
- Language: French
- Series: Inspector Jules Maigret
- Published: 1951 (France); 1963 (GB)
- Media type: Print

Maigret's Memoirs is a novel by the Belgian writer Georges Simenon. Unlike other Maigret novels, there is no plot; Jules Maigret himself writes about his life and work, and about his relation with the novelist Georges Simenon.

It was written from 19 to 26 September 1950 in Lakeville, Connecticut USA. Simenon had recently remarried and had invited his new mother-in-law to stay for a while. In his autobiography Intimate Memoirs (published in the UK and USA in 1984) he wrote that in the circumstances he could not write a demanding novel: "I was looking for an easy subject... and that was when I got the idea of writing Maigret’s Memoirs. To me, it was something like writing a letter to a friend, and therefore entertaining".

The original French version, Les Mémoires de Maigret, appeared in 1951, and it was first published in Great Britain in 1963. It was included, with Maigret and the Headless Corpse and Maigret and the Saturday Caller, in Maigret Victorious (1975).

It has been described as "a book about writing, about distinctions between art and reality: a fictional character talks about himself as though he were real, and the real author is introduced as a character in this fiction".

== Summary ==
The work is written in the first person by Maigret, who has retired; he writes it in order to present the reality of police work, and of his life, which he thinks may differ from the impressions given by Georges Simenon in his Maigret novels. He writes that he is trying "to size up one image against another image, one character against its double...."

He describes his meeting with Simenon, introduced to him, originally as Georges Sim, by his boss Guichard; he was a self-assured young novelist, and had already read Hans Gross's books and other books about criminology. He wanted to know how Police Headquarters worked and what its atmosphere was like.

Sim then published a popular novel in which Maigret is a character, but, wanting to go further and produce novels in which the police are shown in their true light, he asked to follow Maigret in his work. The first results were The Hanged Man of Saint-Pholien and The Late Monsieur Gallet. Simenon (as he called himself by then), expecting criticism after Maigret had read them, said: "Truth never seems true.... If you don't dress it up, it'll seem incredible, artificial. Dress it up, and it'll seem more real than life."

Maigret and Simenon have become good friends, and Maigret has visited him several times in the various places where the novelist has lived.

Maigret describes his early life in central France where his father was an estate manager. He studied medicine but gave it up and moved to Paris. Meeting at his hotel a man who worked for the police, he chose to become a policeman. He describes how he met his wife Louise, and his life on the beat dealing with pickpockets, prostitutes, patrolling big stores and the Gare du Nord; and his later promotion to the Special Squad. He writes about his understanding of criminals; "You have to know the milieu in which a crime has been committed...." He mentions the sort of crime about which Simenon has written most, committed suddenly in an unlikely setting, a result of something secretly building up for a long time.

He corrects some inaccuracies in the books, which his wife has reminded him about: details about Maigret's colleagues Torrence and Janvier; and the sloe gin, which Simenon mentions that he drinks at home, is actually raspberry brandy.
