= Diego Valverde Villena =

Spanish poet

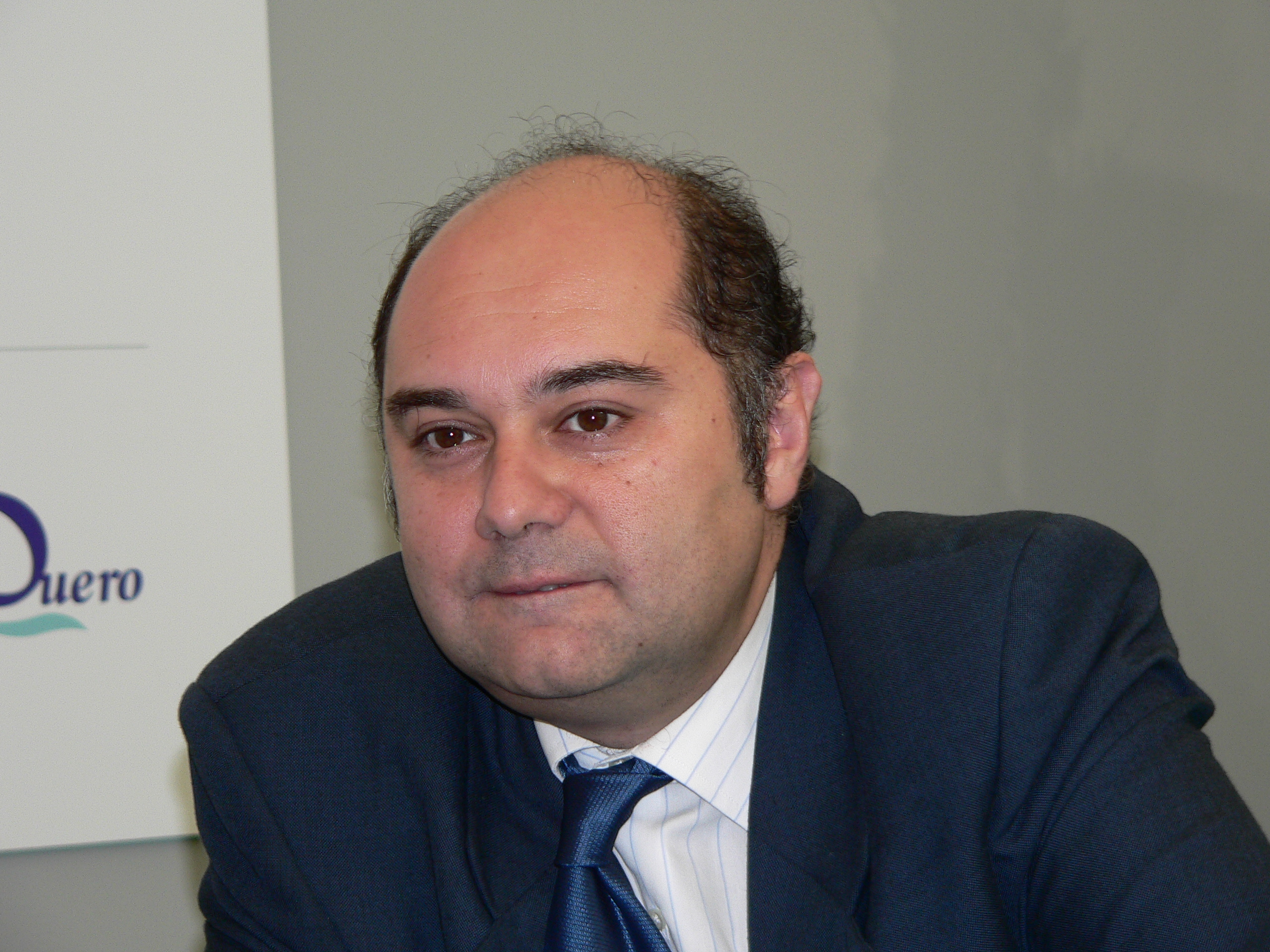
Diego Valverde Villena

Diego Valverde Villena, born on April 6, 1967, is a poet, essayist and polyglot who holds triple-citizenship. He is Peruvian by birth to Spanish and Bolivian parents.

== Life ==
Villena was born on April 6, 1967, in Lima, Peru. In 1971, when he was four, his family left Peru for Spain. Like numerous other writers with a Catholic background, he received a Jesuit education, at San Jose (St Joseph), in Valladolid. From 1985 to 1991 he earned three BLitts (in Spanish, English and German letters) at the University of Valladolid. During this time he also attended courses on language and literature at the University of Salamanca (in Scandinavian languages), University of Edinburgh (in Modernism), University College Dublin (in Irish literature and culture) and at the University of Wroclaw (in Polish language and literature). Afterwards he undertook doctoral studies in Medieval English Literature at the University of Oxford, the University of Heidelberg, the University of Tübingen, the University of Chicago and the Complutense University of Madrid, where he earned a MLitt in English Literature.

Valverde Villena worked as a lecturer in several universities, mainly at the Universidad Mayor de San Andres in La Paz, Bolivia, where he taught Medieval Lyric, Baroque Lyric and Poetry between 1996-1998 and after 2010. From 2002 to 2004 he worked in the staff of the Secretary of State for Culture in Spain. He currently resides in Bolivia, but travels frequently to Spain.

He has translated into Spanish a wide assortment of literary works, by authors which include Arthur Conan Doyle, Rudyard Kipling, John Donne, Edmund Spenser, George Herbert, Ezra Pound, Emily Dickinson, Mikolaj Sep Szarzynski, Paul Éluard, Joachim du Bellay, Valery Larbaud, Nuno Júdice, Jorge Sousa Braga, E.T.A. Hoffmann and Paul Celan.

== Style ==
According to the poet Julio Martínez Mesanza, Valverde Villena's intricately allusive poetry comes from "a perfect mixture of life and culture". His cultural allusions serve as proper devices to show the poet's deepest feelings in a way which resembles the conceit used by the Metaphysical poets. Martínez Mesanza points to John Donne and Ausias March as major influences on Valverde Villena.

Valverde Villena's short poems have been called "flash poems" or "spark poems" by some critics, because they concentrate so many ideas into a few lines of verse. In the words of the poet Ahmed Higazi, "it's like having a big lion in a little cage".

Valverde Villena's poetry multiplies allusions not only to the literary traditions of several languages, but also to history, anthropology, religion, music and cinema.

== Works ==
Poetry

- El difícil ejercicio del olvido, La Paz, Bolivia, 1997.
- Chicago, West Barry, 628, Sueltos de la Selva Profunda, Logroño, 2000.
- No olvides mi rostro, Huerga y Fierro, Madrid, 2001.
- Infierno del enamorado, Valladolid, 2002.
- El espejo que lleva mi nombre escrito, Cairo, 2006.
- Shir Hashirim, Ediciones del Caracol Descalzo, Madrid, 2006.
- Iconos, a three-part poem -a triptych of icons- released with the music composed for it by Juan Manuel Ruiz, 2008.
- Un segundo de vacilación, La Paz, Bolivia, 2011.
- Panteras, Madrid, 2015

Anthologies

- 33 de Radio 3, Calamar/RNE 3, Madrid, 2004.
- Antología de poesía española y egipcia contemporánea, Instituto Egipcio de Estudios Islámicos, Madrid, 2005.
- Diez poetas, diez músicos, Calambur, Madrid, 2008.

Essays

- Para Catalina Micaela: Álvaro Mutis, más allá del tiempo, UMSA, La Paz, Bolivia, 1997.
- Varado entre murallas y gaviotas. Seis entradas en la bitácora del Maqroll el Gaviero, Gente Común, La Paz, Bolivia, 2011
- Dominios inventados, Plural, La Paz, Bolivia, 2013.
- "Poesía boliviana reciente" en La Jornada Semanal, Mexico, June 27, 1999.
- "El espejo de la calle Gaona: los pasadizos entre ficción y realidad en Jorge Luis Borges", Clarín, 30, Nov.-Dec. 2000, pp. 5–10.
- "Don Álvaro ante el rey, tantos años después", Clarín, 32, March–April 2001, pp. 3–8.
- "Mujeres de mirada fija y lento paso: el eterno femenino en la poesía de Álvaro Mutis", Excelsior, Mexico, June 7, 2002.
- "Hechos de armas bajo la bandera de Álvaro Mutis", Letras Libres, 10, July 2002, pp. 46–48.
- "Spain: Agape and conviviality at the table", in Culinary Cultures of Europe, Council of Europe Publishing, Strasbourg, 2005.
- "Al amparo de Isis (un viaje a Egipto)", in Clarín, 63, May–June 2006, pp. 66–68.
- "Cuando Stonewall Jackson conoció al General Lee: una semblanza de José María Álvarez", introduction to Los prodigios de la cera, by José María Álvarez, Caracas, 2008, pp. 13–17.
- "Los caminos de T. S. Eliot", in Renacimiento, Seville, 2008, pp. 106–108.

Prose translations

- Nuestro visitante de medianoche y otras historias, by Arthur Conan Doyle, Valdemar, Madrid, 2001.
- La vida imperial de Rudyard Kipling (The Long Recessional), by David Gilmour, Seix Barral, Barcelona, 2003.
- En interés de la Hermandad (In the Interests of the Brethren), by Rudyard Kipling, in Conde de Aranda, 3, 2007, pp. 91–110.

Editions

- Alvaro Mutis, La voz de Alvaro Mutis, edited by Diego Valverde Villena, Poesía en la Residencia, Residencia de Estudiantes, Madrid, 2001.
- Luis Alberto de Cuenca, De amor y de amargura, edited, selected and with a preface by Diego Valverde Villena, Renacimiento, Seville, 2005.
- Gaviero. Ensayos sobre Álvaro Mutis, edited, selected and with a preface by Diego Valverde Villena, Verbum, Madrid, 2014.

== Sources ==
- Martinez Mesanza, Julio, "Diego Valverde Villena: palabras cultas, palabras vivas", in Nueva revista, 79, Jan.-Feb. 2002, pp. 162–163.
- Gomez Villegas, Nicanor, "La materia Valverdiana", Ojos de papel, April, 2008
- Sayed Mohamed Sayed Qutb, "Retoques incompletos, meta del poeta entre Diego Valverde Villena y Ali Mansour", in Medio siglo de hispanismo en Egipto (1957-2007), Cairo, Darat al-Karaz, 2008, pp. 163–170 and 217–221.
