= Tayibe =

Tayibe: טייבה; الطَّيِّبَة
- City (from 1990)

Hebrew transcription(s)
  - Also spelled: Tayiba (unofficial)
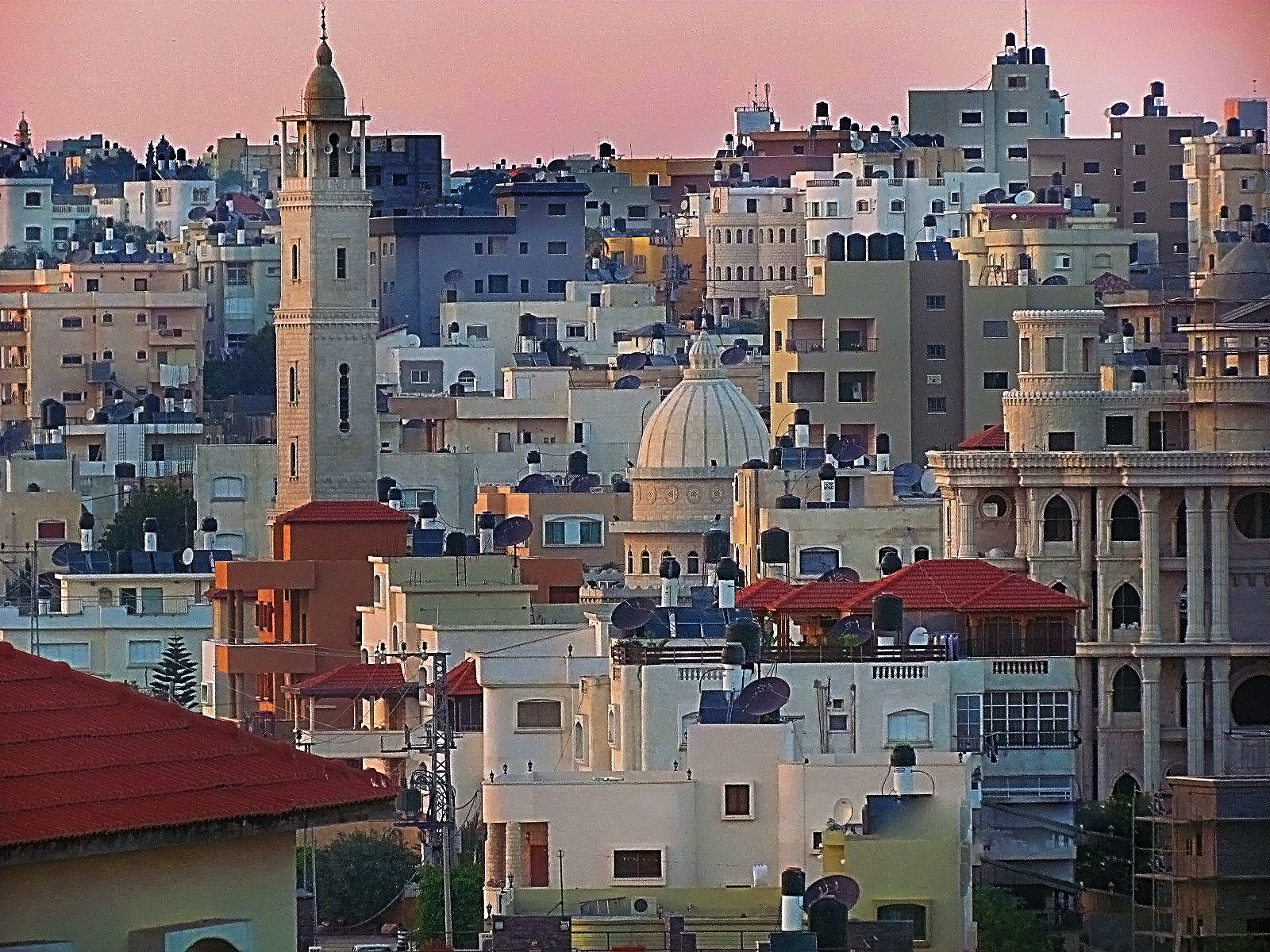

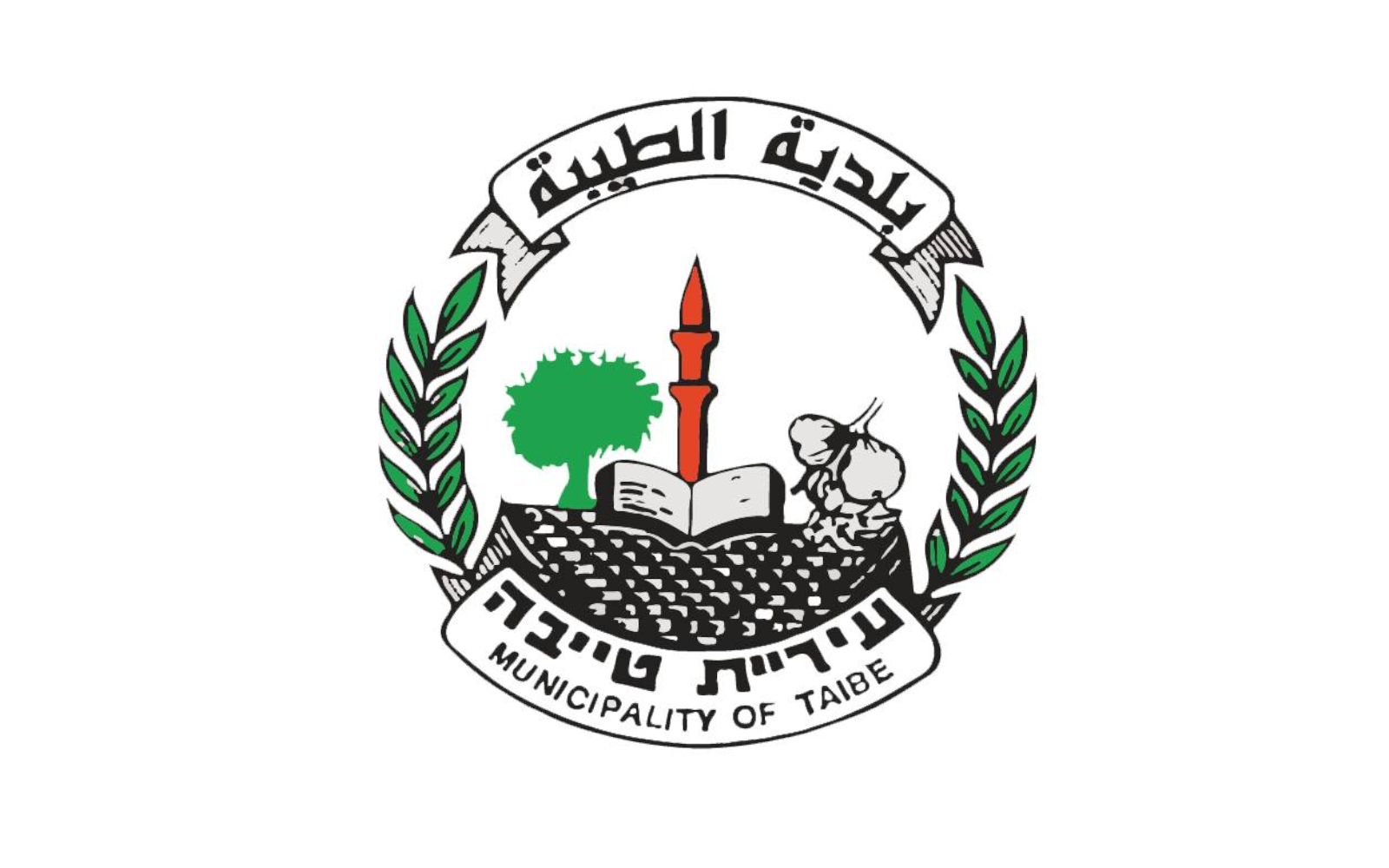
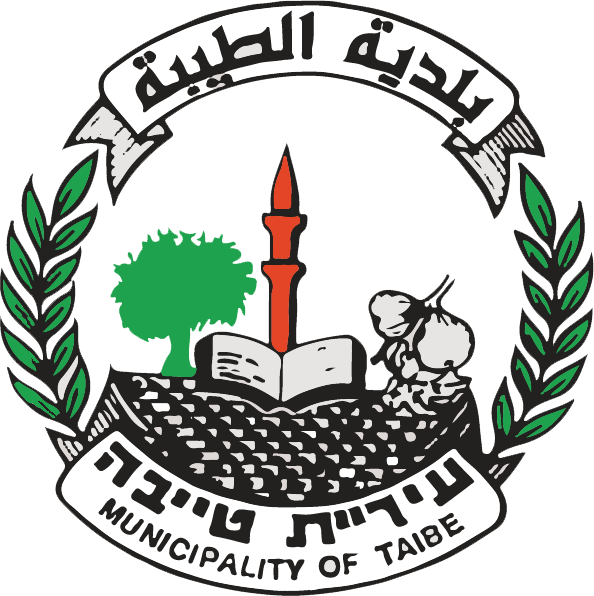
- Flag

- Location within Central Israel Location within Israel
- Coordinates: 32°16′0″N 35°00′37″E
- Grid position: 151/185 PAL
- Country: Israel
- District: Central
- Subdistrict: HaSharon
- Natural Region: Eastern Sharon

Area
  - Total: 18,662 dunams (18.662 km^{2}; 7.205 sq mi)

Population (2024)
  - Total: 46,870
  - Density: 2,512/km^{2} (6,505/sq mi)
- Name meaning: The Goodly

Tayibe, also spelled Taibeh or Tayiba, (Arabic: الطَّيِّبَة, romanized: eṭ-Ṭayyibe, lit. 'the kind/benevolent', South Levantine pronunciation: [etˈtˤɑjbe]; Hebrew: טַיִּבֶּה) is an Arab city in central Israel, 12 km (7 mi) north east of Kfar Saba. Part of the Triangle region, in 2024 it had a population of 46,870.

== History ==
It has been suggested that the village is identical with Tivatha (טיבתה), a settlement mentioned in the Talmud. According to the Jerusalemite Talmud (Demai 22c), the inn of this settlement (Pundeqâ de Tibetah) marked the territorial limit of Caesarea.

Tayyibat al-Ism, as the site was known, was allocated by sultan Baibars to his amirs in 663 AH (1265–1266 CE), about five centuries after the Arab conquest of Palestine. In Mamluk times, the village name appeared on documents referring to the waqf of the mosque in Hebron. The endowment deed, dated to the reign of Sultan Qalawun (d. 1290) records the village's lands using ancient landmarks like milestones, paved roads, and oil presses.

=== Ottoman Empire ===
Under Ottoman rule after 1517, a sijill (royal order) from 941/1535 gave 1/3 of the revenue from Tayyibat al-Ism to Ribat al-Mansuri; a hospital in Jerusalem established by Al-Mansur Qalawun in 1282. The tax register of 1596 shows the village was under the administration of the nahiya of Bani Sab. A population of 50 households ("khana") and 5 bachelors, all Muslim, paid a fixed tax rate of 33,3% on wheat, barley, summer crops ( melons, beans, vegetables), olive trees, beehives and goats; a total of 19,800 akçe. All of the revenue went to a waqf. Pierre Jacotin called the village Taibeh on his map in 1799.

In the 1860s, the Ottoman authorities granted the village agricultural plots of land called Ghabat al-Taiyiba al-Shamaliyya and Ghabat al-Taiyiba al-Qibliyya in the former confines of the Forest of Arsur (Ar. Al-Ghaba) in the coastal plain, west of the village.

In 1870/1871 (1288 AH), an Ottoman census listed the village in the nahiya (sub-district) of Bani Sa'b.

The French explorer Victor Guérin described it as a village south of Fardisya, while in the 1882 "Survey of Western Palestine", Tayibe was described as: "a large straggling village on the end of a slope, principally built of stone. It is supplied by cisterns and surrounded with olives."

=== British Mandate ===
In the 1922 census of Palestine, Taibeh had a population of 2,350, all Muslims, increasing in the 1931 census, to 2,944, all Muslim, living in 658 houses. The count may have included two nearby Bedouin tribes.

In the 1945 statistics the population was 4,290 Muslims, while the land area was 32,750 dunams, according to an official land and population survey. This included some nearby Arab communities. Of this, 559 were allocated for citrus and bananas, 3,180 plantations and irrigable land, 23,460 for cereals, while 281 dunams were classified as built-up areas.

The Gazetteer of the Palestinian Rural History Project records several rural dependencies of Taiyibe, including Khirbat al-'Amarir (خربة العمارير), Khirbat Tikla/Tikli (خربة تكلة), Ghabat al-Tawil, Rabi' and al-Nuseirat (غابة الطويل، ربيع والنصيرات), and al-Jalama (الجلمة).

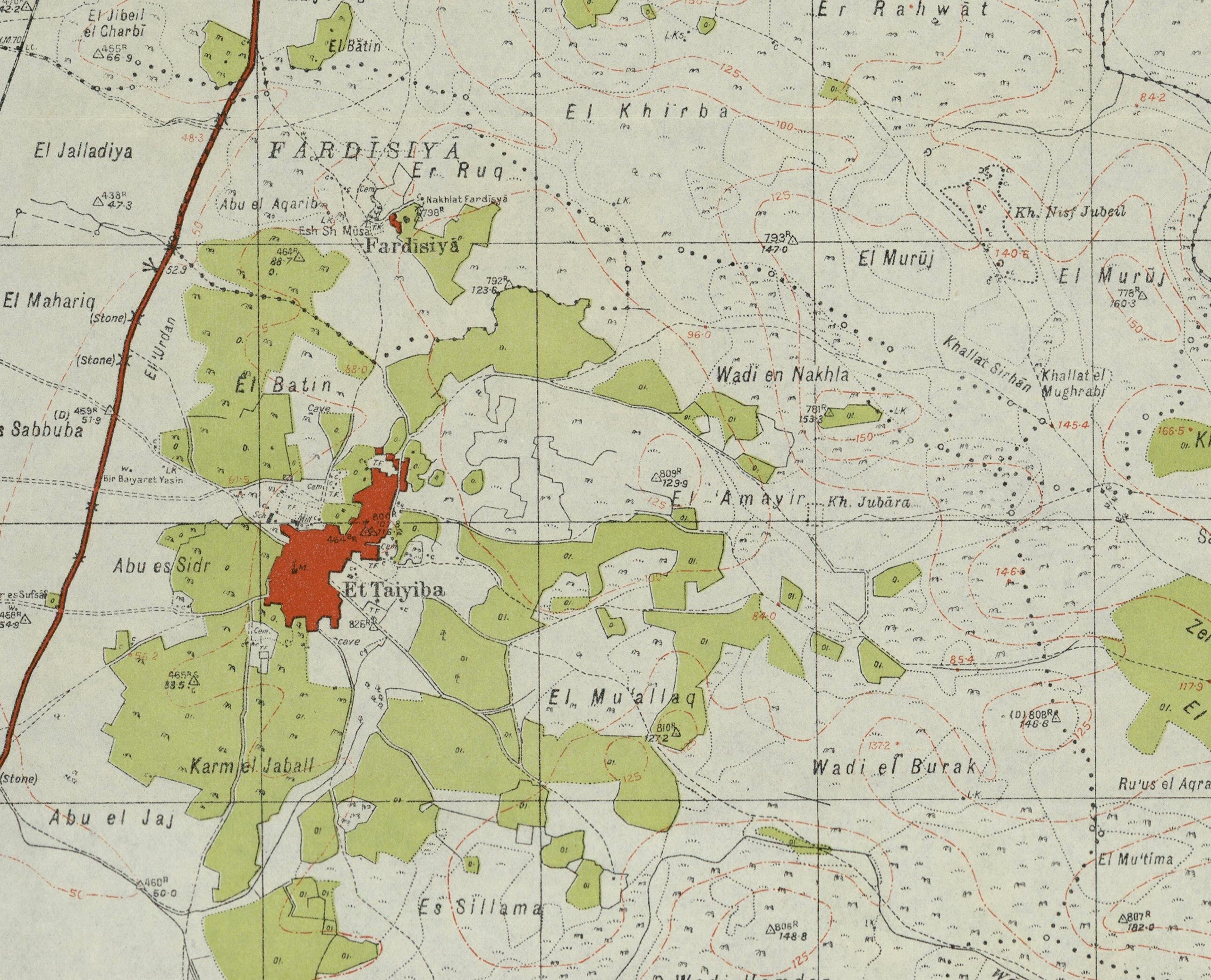
Tayibe 1942 1:20,000

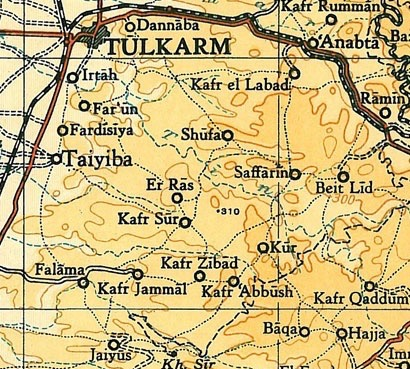
Tayibe 1945 1:250,000

=== Israel ===
During the 1948 Arab–Israeli War, Israeli forces captured land near the town, but not the town itself. Tayibe was transferred to Israel as part of the 1949 cease-fire agreement with Jordan. According to David Gilmour, "the inhabitants were furious that Abdullah I of Jordan had simply handed them over to Israel but were relieved that they were to be reunited with their land. However, the Law of Acquisition of Absentee Property, which was passed in 1950 but made retroactive, was specially devised to take care of cases like this. Although they had not moved from their village, the inhabitants were declared 'absentees' and their land 'abandoned property'. According to the villagers, they lost 8,000 acres (3,237.49 ha) of their 11,000 acres (4,451.54 ha)."

Tayibe achieved local council status in 1952. In 1990, it was declared a city.

In 2022, the Supreme Court ruled that the 2017 seizure of 7.5 acres (3.04 ha) by the same legal device was permitted and charged costs to the petitioners. The families involved were refused access to the maps on which the ruling was based on "national security" grounds. Haaretz described the move as "legalized theft", "in defiance of both the spirit of the law and its rationale".

On 11 October 2024, five residents of Tayibe were indicted for allegedly pledging allegiance to Islamic State, viewing the group's social media content, and having watched "instructional videos on preparing explosives and bombs." with one suspect accused of stating his intent to "blow up Azrieli" a skyscraper complex in Tel Aviv.

On May 19, 2026, Prime Minister Benjamin Netanyahu and Transport Minister Miri Regev opened the Shomron-Tayibe station outside the city of Tayibe. At the ceremony, they spoke of opening the entire Eastern Railway for passenger service by the end of 2026.

== Demographics ==
Historical population
Year	Pop.	±%
1972	12,900	—
1983	17,700	+37.2%
1995	24,300	+37.3%
2008	35,700	+46.9%
2022	45,071	+26.2%
2024	46,870	+4.0%

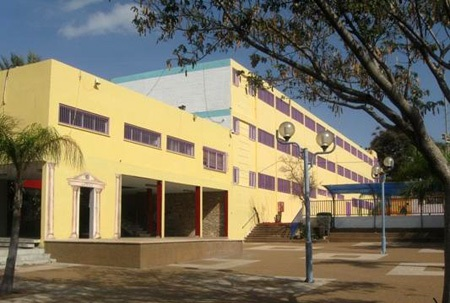
Amal College, Tayibe

According to CBS, the Israeli Central Bureau of Statistics, in 2001 the ethnic makeup of the city was 100.0% Arab (99.7% Muslim), with no significant Jewish population. In 2001 the population was 29,600 with 15,100 males and 14,500 females. 47.5% of the population was 19 years of age or younger, 17.4% between 20 and 29, 20.3% between 30 and 44, 9.6% from 45 to 59, 2.0% from 60 to 64, and 3.3% 65 years of age or older. The population growth rate in 2001 was 3.2%. In 2011, it had a population of 38,575.

Tayibe had an estimated population of 40,200 in 2014, up from 35,700 in the 2008 census.

The population of Tayibe, one of the largest and most developed Arab localities in Israel, is made up of 20 extended families, all Muslim.

== Landmarks ==
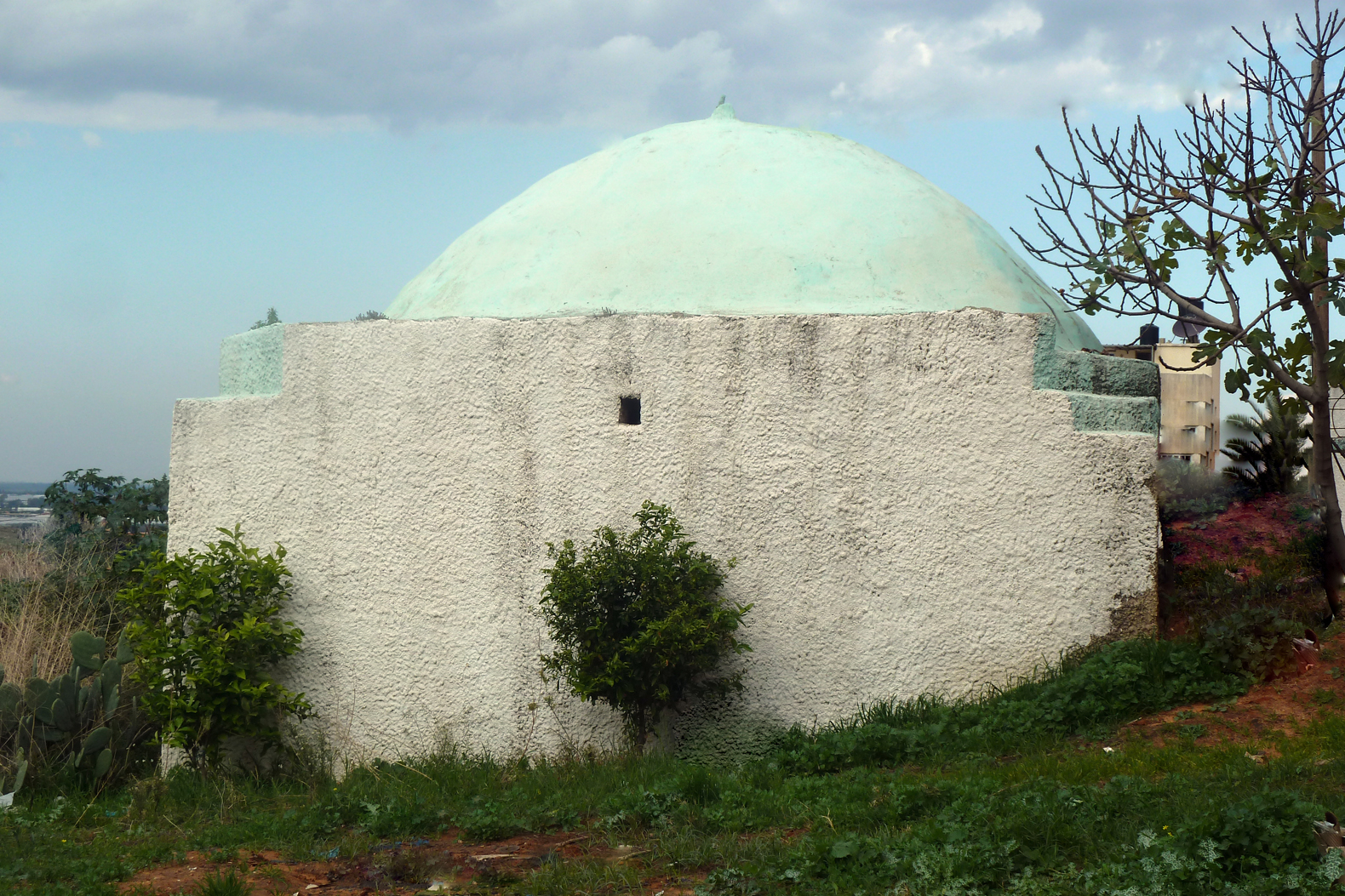
Maqam of Sheikh Mas‘ud

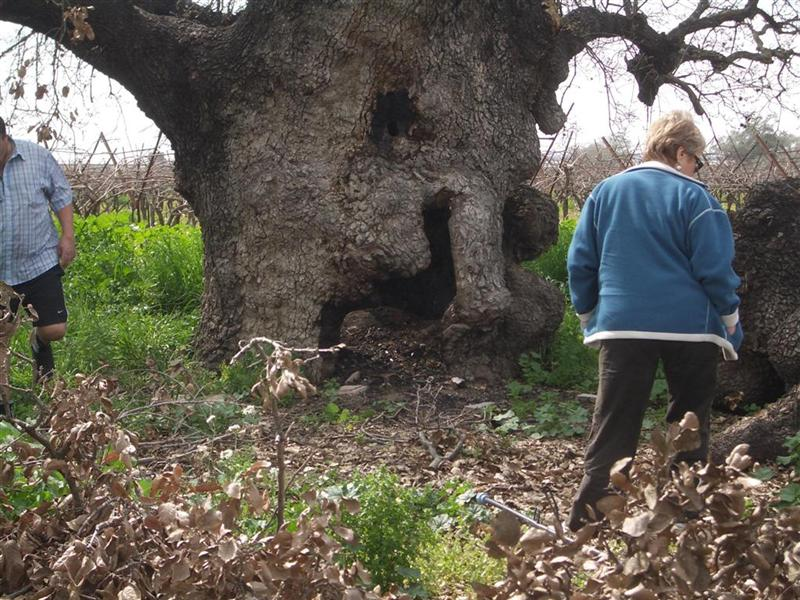
Tayibe oak tree

An ancient oak tree in Tayibe was declared the largest in Israel. The oak has a trunk circumference of 690 centimeters. According to local legend, there is an angel that watches over the tree and avenges any damage to it. It is said to be 1,400 years old, although this has not been scientifically proven.

== Education ==
In 2001, there were 13 schools with a total enrollment of 6,970 students: 9 elementary schools (3,984 students) and 4 high schools (2,986 students). Nearly half of all 12th graders completed their Bagrut matriculation exams.

An educational empowerment project has been operating in Tayibe since 2006 to reduce the dropout rate among Bedouin students. The students receive extra help in Arabic, Hebrew, English and math, and attend special enrichment workshops in inter-personal communication. Following the success of this project, the project has been expanded to nearby Qalansawe and other Arab villages in Israel.

The Tayibe Women Against Violence organization was established to work against violence in the community. The organization offers seminars and workshops that increase women's awareness of their rights and helps them find jobs.

== Sports ==
The now-defunct Hapoel Tayibe F.C. were the first Israeli Arab club to play in the top division of Israeli football. The town is currently represented by Shimshon Bnei Tayibe F.C..

== Voting Patterns ==
In the 2022 election, 97 percent of voters in Tayibe voted for the Arab parties, while 2 percent voted for the parties of the center-left coalition led by Yair Lapid and 1 percent voted for the parties of the right-wing coalition led by Benjamin Netanyahu. Among the voters for the Arab parties, 65 percent voted for the Hadash–Ta'al list, while 18 percent voted for Balad and 17 percent voted for Ra'am.

In the 2026 election, 98 percent of voters in Tayibe voted for the Arab parties, while 2 percent voted for the parties of the center-left coalition led by Gadi Eisenkot and 0.2 percent voted for the parties of the right-wing coalition led by Benjamin Netanyahu. Among the voters for the Arab parties, 86 percent voted for the Joint List, while 14 percent voted for Ra'am. Voter turnout increased 55 percent from the 2022 election.

== Notable people ==
- Senan Abdelqader, architect and urban planner
- Hussniya Jabara, member of the Knesset, Meretz
- Abdallah Jaber (born 1993), footballer for Israeli Premier League club Hapoel Hadera
- Kais Nashef, actor
- Mahmud A-Nashaf (1906–1979), member of the Knesset
- Ahmad Tibi, member of the Knesset, Ta'al
- Abdul Latif Tibawi (1910–1981), historian and educationalist
- Rafik Haj Yahia (1949–2000), member of the Knesset
- Walid Haj Yahia, member of the Knesset, Meretz

== See also ==
- Demographics of Israel
- Arab localities in Israel

== Bibliography ==
- Barron, J.B., ed. (1923). Palestine: Report and General Abstracts of the Census of 1922. Government of Palestine.
- Burgoyne, Michael Hamilton (1987). Mamluk Jerusalem. ISBN 090503533X.
- Conder, C.R.; Kitchener, H.H. (1882). The Survey of Western Palestine: Memoirs of the Topography, Orography, Hydrography, and Archaeology. Vol. 2. London: Committee of the Palestine Exploration Fund.
- Department of Statistics (1945). Village Statistics, April, 1945. Government of Palestine.
- Gilmour, David (1983): Dispossessed. The Ordeal of the Palestinians. Sphere books, Great Britain, ISBN 0-7221-3842-3
- Guérin, V. (1875). Description Géographique Historique et Archéologique de la Palestine (in French). Vol. 2: Samarie, pt. 2. Paris: L'Imprimerie Nationale.
- Hadawi, S. (1970). Village Statistics of 1945: A Classification of Land and Area ownership in Palestine. Palestine Liberation Organization Research Center.
- Hütteroth, W.-D.; Abdulfattah, K. (1977). Historical Geography of Palestine, Transjordan and Southern Syria in the Late 16th Century. Erlanger Geographische Arbeiten, Sonderband 5. Erlangen, Germany: Vorstand der Fränkischen Geographischen Gesellschaft. ISBN 3-920405-41-2.
- Karmon, Y. (1960). "An Analysis of Jacotin's Map of Palestine" (PDF). Israel Exploration Journal. 10 (3, 4): 155–173, 244–253. Archived from the original (PDF) on 22 December 2019.
- Mills, E., ed. (1932). Census of Palestine 1931. Population of Villages, Towns and Administrative Areas. Jerusalem: Government of Palestine.
- Palmer, E.H. (1881). The Survey of Western Palestine: Arabic and English Name Lists Collected During the Survey by Lieutenants Conder and Kitchener, R. E. Transliterated and Explained by E.H. Palmer. Committee of the Palestine Exploration Fund.
- Petersen, Andrew (2001). A Gazetteer of Buildings in Muslim Palestine (British Academy Monographs in Archaeology). Vol. I. Oxford University Press. ISBN 978-0-19-727011-0.
