= John Coffey (historian) =

British historian

John Coffey (born 1969) is a British historian who works on religion, politics and ideas in the Protestant Atlantic world, c. 1600-1850. He studied history at Cambridge and completed a PhD under the supervision of Mark Goldie at Churchill College, Cambridge, where he held a Junior Research Fellowship, before taking up a British Academy Postdoctoral Fellowship at University College London. He has taught the University of Leicester. since 1999, serving as Head of History from 2013 to 2016. He has written monographs on Samuel Rutherford and John Goodwin and was an editor on the critical edition of Richard Baxter's Reliquiae Baxterianae. His Persecution and Toleration in Protestant England, 1558–1689 is the first overview work on the topic since W. K. Jordan's four-volume work The Development of Religious Toleration in England (1932–1940).

== Recent publications ==
- Politics, Religion and the British Revolutions: The Mind of Samuel Rutherford, Cambridge University Press, 1997
- Persecution and Toleration in Protestant England, 1558–1689, Longman, 2000
- John Goodwin and the Puritan Revolution, Boydell and Brewer, 2006
- The Cambridge Companion to Puritanism, ed. John Coffey and Paul C-H. Lim, Cambridge University Press, 2008
- Seeing Things their Way: Intellectual History and the Return of Religion, ed. Alister Chapman, John Coffey and Brad Gregory, University of Notre Dame Press, 2009
- Exodus and Liberation: Deliverance Politics from John Calvin to Martin Luther King Jr., Oxford University Press 2014
- Heart Religion: Evangelical Piety in Britain and Ireland, 1690-1850, ed. John Coffey, Oxford University Press, 2016
- Politics, Religion and Ideas in Seventeenth and Eighteenth-Century Britain, ed. Justin Champion, John Coffey, Tim Harris and John Marshall, Boydell, 2019
- The Oxford History of Protestant Dissenting Traditions, vol. I: The Post-Reformation Era, c.1559-1689, ed. John Coffey, Oxford University Press, 2020
- Reliquiae Baxterianae, ed. N. H. Keeble, John Coffey, Tim Cooper, and Tom Charlton, 5 vols, Oxford University Press, 2020
