= The Hanged Man of Saint-Pholien =

Novel by Georges Simenon

- Author: Georges Simenon
- Original title: Le Pendu de Saint Pholien
- Language: French
- Series: Inspector Jules Maigret
- Genre: Detective fiction
- Publisher: A. Fayard
- Publication date: 1931
- Media type: Print
- Preceded by: The Late Monsieur Gallet
- Followed by: The Carter of 'La Providence'

The Hanged Man of Saint-Pholien is a novel by the Belgian writer Georges Simenon. The original French-language version, Le Pendu de Saint-Pholien, appeared in 1931. It was the second novel featuring Detective Chief Inspector Jules Maigret of the Paris judicial police to be published as a book. It has been translated into English three times and adapted for television twice.

Maigret unintentionally provokes the suicide of a man who had been acting suspiciously in Bremen, Germany. His investigation leads him to a group of men who had known each other when they were students in Liège, Belgium, but who deny any connection to the dead man. The plot was inspired by events leading to the suicide of a friend of Simenon's when he was a young man in Liège.

== Plot ==
While in Brussels on police business, Detective Chief Inspector Maigret of the Paris judicial police notices a sickly and impoverished-looking man, who counts a large quantity of banknotes and posts them as "Printed Matter" to an address in Paris. Intrigued, he follows the man by train via Amsterdam to Bremen in Germany. At the German frontier town of Neuschanz, the man goes to a buffet where Maigret switches his cheap suitcase with a substitute he had bought. In a hotel room in Bremen, the man kills himself when he finds his suitcase has been switched. The original suitcase contains an old suit made in Liège: it is not the dead man's size, and analysis shows that it has large bloodstains that are years old. The dead man was travelling with a false passport under the name Louis Jeunet.

At the mortuary Maigret meets Joseph Van Damme, a Belgian with an import-export business in Bremen, who seems to be interested in the dead man. In Paris Maigret finds that Jeunet posted the banknotes to his own address, a cheap hotel. Maigret goes to Rheims, where Jeunet's photograph, printed in newspapers, has been recognised. He was seen with Émile Belloir, the vice-director of a bank. Visiting Belloir, Maigret again meets Van Damme, along with Gaston Janin, a sculptor in Paris, and Jef Lombard, who has a photoengraving business in Liège. They tell Maigret that they were once students together in Liège. They look alarmed when Maigret shows them the photograph but deny knowing the dead man.

Maigret finds that Jeunet's real name was Jean Lecocq d'Arneville. He visits Jef Lombard's workshop in Liège and finds Van Damme is also there. When Maigret mentions Lecocq d'Arneville's name, Lombard and Van Damme are disconcerted. On the wall of Lombard's office are numerous sketches showing hanged men, drawn by Lombard, he says, when he was nineteen. Some show the old church of Saint Pholien (L'église Saint-Pholien) in the city.

Maigret finds a police report dating from ten years earlier: Émile Klein, a young house painter, had been found hanged on the door of the church of Saint Pholien. At Klein's old address near the church, Maigret encounters Van Damme, Belloir and Lombard, who unsuccessfully try to bribe him to delay the investigation for two months when the statute of limitations will make prosecution impossible. Belloir tells Maigret that as young men he, Van Damme, Lombard, Janin, Klein and Lecocq d'Arneville were members of a group calling themselves "The Companions of the Apocalypse", who met in that room, a studio rented by Klein. The group mostly drank to excess and discussed radical intellectual ideas. After debating the idea of killing someone, Klein stabbed a wealthy young Jewish acquaintance who despised the group, and Belloir strangled the dying man, leaving blood stains on his own suit. Van Damme, Belloir and Lombard threw the dead man into the Meuse, which was in flood; the body was never found. Klein hanged himself two months later, and the group dispersed.

Lecocq d'Arneville was broken and tormented by the affair. He began binge drinking and was unable to hold down a job. Three years ago he started blackmailing the others, using Belloir's blood-stained suit as evidence. He burnt the banknotes he extorted from them because he only wanted to reduce them to poverty like himself. Maigret, aware that three of the men have children, ultimately does not take any action against them.

== Background ==
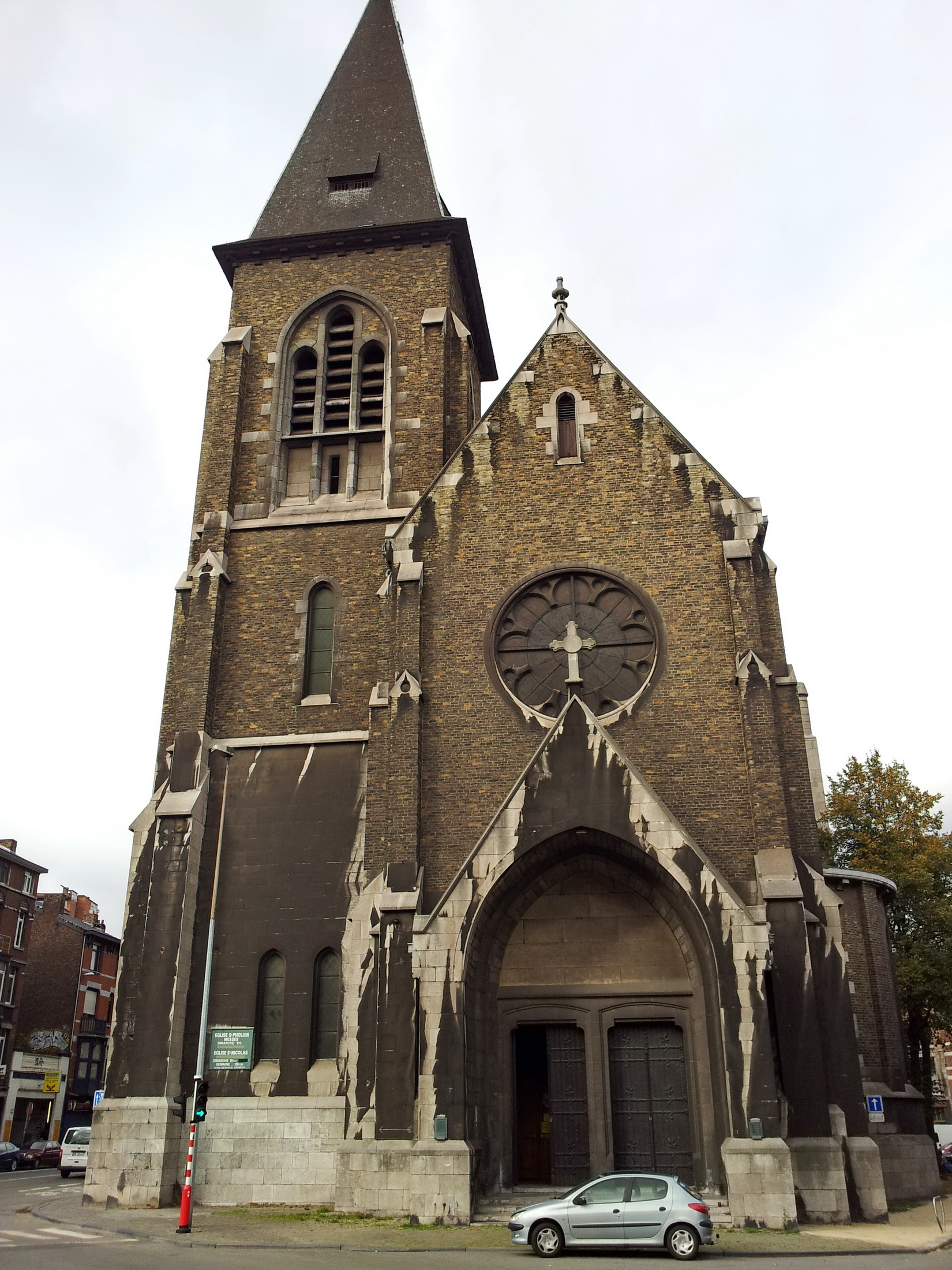
St Pholien's Church, Liège, built in 1914.

The story is based on Simenon's experiences as a young adult in Liège. He was one of a group calling themselves "La Caque" whose members led a bohemian lifestyle and questioned conventional morality. The group was close knit – "La Caque" refers to a fisherman's barrel used for closely packing and transporting herring – and the painters in the group frequently portrayed hanged men. One member, a painter and friend of Simenon named Joseph Kleine, was found hanging from the door of the church of St Pholien. It was apparently suicide, but the police did not rule out murder.

== Publication history ==
The novel was first published in French as Le Pendu de Saint-Pholien by Fayard in Paris in 1931. It was the second novel featuring Detective Maigret of the Paris judicial police to be published in book form. The first English translation, by Anthony Abbot, entitled The Crime of Inspector Maigret, appeared in 1933, published by Hurst and Blackett in London and by Covici, Friede in New York. In 1963 a translation by Tony White, Maigret and the Hundred Gibbets, was published by Penguin Books. A translation by Linda Coverdale, The Hanged Man of Saint-Pholien, was published by Penguin Classics in 2014 and by Macmillan in the United States in 2025.

== Adaptations ==
The novel has been adapted for television twice: by BBCTV in 1961 as The Children's Party, starring Rupert Davies as Maigret; and for French television (Antenne 2) in 1981 as Maigret et le pendu de Saint-Pholien, starring Jean Richard in the lead role.

== Bibliography ==
- Marnham, Patrick (1994). The Man Who Wasn't Maigret, A Portrait of Georges Simenon. Harcourt Brace & Company. ISBN 0-15-600059-8.
- Simenon, Georges (2014). The Hanged Man of Saint-Pholien. Translated by Coverdale, Linda. London: Penguin. ISBN 9780141393452.
- Young, Trudee (1976). Georges Simenon, a checklist of his 'Maigret' and other mystery novels and short stories in French and in English translations. Metuchen, N.J.: The Scarecrow Press. ISBN 0-8108-0964-8.
