= Mark Goldie =

English historian

Mark Goldie FRHistS
- Born: c. 1952 (age c. 73)
- Spouse: Clare Jackson

Academic background
- Education: University of Sussex; Corpus Christi College, Cambridge
- Doctoral advisor: Quentin Skinner

Academic work
- Discipline: History
- School or tradition: Cambridge School (intellectual history)
- Institutions: Gonville and Caius College, Cambridge; Churchill College, Cambridge
- Doctoral students: Justin Champion; John Coffey; Timothy Harris; Clare Jackson
- Main interests: Intellectual history; political theory; Age of Enlightenment; John Locke

Mark Goldie (born c. 1952) is an English historian and Emeritus Professor of Intellectual History at Churchill College, Cambridge. He has written on the English political theorist John Locke and is a member of the Early Modern History and Political Thought and Intellectual History subject groups at the Faculty of History in Cambridge.

He was educated at the University of Sussex and obtained his PhD from Corpus Christi College, Cambridge. In 1979, he was appointed college lecturer at Churchill College and a university lecturer in 1993. He is a Fellow of the Royal Historical Society. Upon his retirement in 2019 he became an honorary professor of history at the University of Sussex.

== Personal life ==
Goldie is married to fellow historian Clare Jackson, who was once his doctoral student.

== Works ==
- "The Roots of True Whiggism 1688-94", History of Political Thought, 2.1 (1980), 195-236.
- "John Locke and Anglican Royalism", Political Studies, 31.1 (1983), 61-85.
- (editor, with Tim Harris and Paul Seaward), The Politics of Religion in Restoration England (Oxford: Blackwell, 1990).
- (editor, with J. H. Burns), The Cambridge History of Political Thought, 1450-1700 (Cambridge University Press, 1991).
- (editor), John Locke: Two Treatises of Government (London: Dent, Everyman Library; and Vermont: Charles E. Tuttle, 1993).
- (editor), John Locke: Political Essays (Cambridge University Press, 1997).
- (editor), The Reception of Locke's Politics, 6 vols. (London: Pickering and Chatto, 1999).
- "The Unacknowledged Republic: Officeholding in Early Modern England", in The Politics of the Excluded, ed. by Tim Harris, (Palgrave: Basingstoke, 2001), pp. 153–94.
- (editor), John Locke: Selected Correspondence (Oxford University Press, 2002).
- (editor, with Robert Wokler), The Cambridge History of Eighteenth-Century Political Thought (Cambridge University Press, 2006).
- (general editor), The Entring Book of Roger Morrice, 1677-1691, 6 vols. (Woodbridge: Boydell, 2007). 7th (Index) volume, 2009. Author of volume one: Roger Morrice and the Puritan Whigs.
- (editor, with Geoffrey Kemp), Censorship of the Press, 1696-1720 (London: Pickering and Chatto, 2009).
- (editor), John Locke: A Letter Concerning Toleration and Other Writings (Indianapolis: Liberty Fund, 2010).
- Contesting the English Polity, 1660-1688, (Woodbridge: Boydell, 2023).
