= Champagne-Ardenne =

Former region of France

Coordinates: 49°00′N 4°30′E

- Former region of France
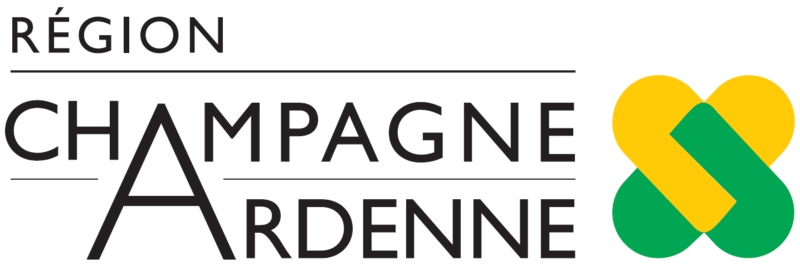
- Flag Coat of arms

- Country: France
- Disbanded: 31 December 2015
- Prefecture: Châlons-en-Champagne
- Departments: 4: Ardennes (08); Aube (10); Haute-Marne (52); Marne (51)

Area
  - Total: 25,606 km^{2} (9,887 sq mi)

Population (2012-01-01)
  - Total: 1,339,270

GDP
  - Total: €49.671 billion (2024)
  - Per capita: €38,326 (2024)
- ISO 3166 code: FR-G
- NUTS Region: FR2

Champagne-Ardenne (French pronunciation: [ʃɑ̃paɲaʁdɛn]) is a former administrative region of France, located in the northeast of the country, bordering Belgium. Mostly corresponding to the historic province of Champagne, the region is known for its sparkling white wine of the same name.

== History ==
The administrative region was formed in 1956, consisting of the four departments Aube, Ardennes, Haute-Marne, and Marne. On 1 January 2016, it merged with the neighboring regions of Alsace and Lorraine to form the new region Grand Est, thereby ceasing to exist as an independent entity.

== Geography ==
Its rivers, most of which flow west, include the Seine, the Marne, and the Aisne. The Meuse flows north.

== Transportation ==
=== Highways ===
- A4 connecting Paris and Strasbourg and serving the Reims metropolitan area
- A5 connecting Paris and Dijon and serving Troyes and Chaumont
- A26 connecting Calais and Troyes and serving Reims and Châlons-en-Champagne
- A34 connecting Reims and the Belgian border and serving Charleville-Mézières

=== Rail ===
The rail network includes the Paris–Strasbourg line, which follows the Marne Valley and serves Épernay, Châlons-en-Champagne, and Vitry-le-François. The LGV Est TGV line also connecting Paris and Strasbourg opened in 2007 and serves Reims with a train station in the commune of Bezannes.

=== Water ===
The region's canals include the Canal latéral à la Marne and Marne-Rhine Canal, the latter connecting to the Marne at Vitry-le-François. These are petit gabarit canals.

=== Air ===
The Vatry International Airport, primarily dedicated to air freight, has a runway 3,650 m (11,980 ft) long. The airport is in a sparsely populated area just 150 km (93 mi) from Paris.

== Economy ==
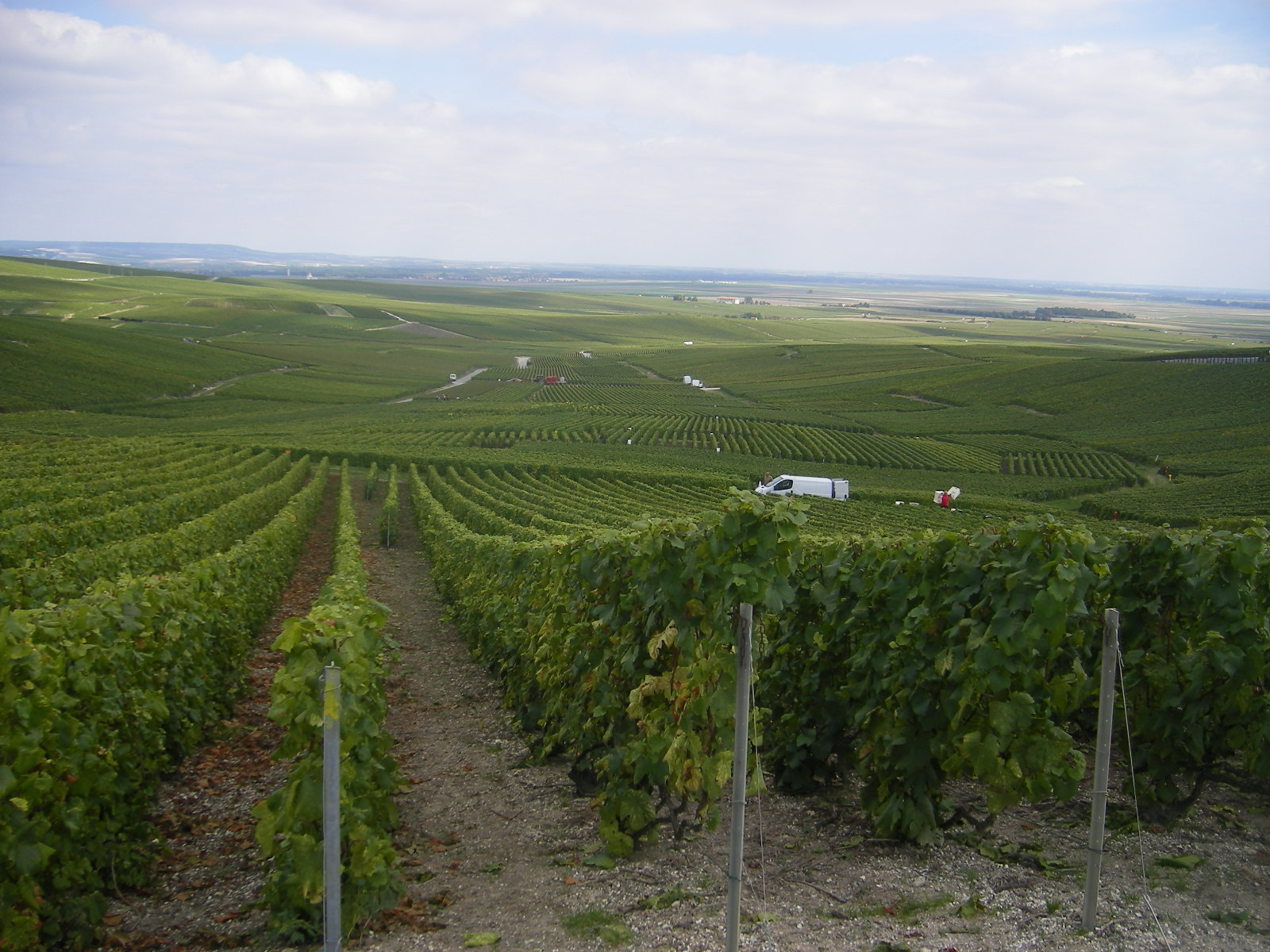
Vineyard in Champagne-Ardenne

- 61.4% of its land is dedicated to agriculture
- 1st in France for the production of barley and alfalfa
- 2nd in France for the production of beets, onions, and peas
- 3rd in France for the production of tender wheat and rapeseed.
- 282.37 km^{2} of vineyards
- Champagne sales in 2001: 263 million bottles (4% increase from 2000) of which 37.6% were exported.
- 25% of French hosiery production
- 3rd metallurgic region in France

=== Businesses ===
- Verreries Mécaniques de Champagne
- Produits Métallurgiques à Reims
- Vallou

=== Food processing ===
- Champagne-Céréales
- France-Luzerne
- Béghin-Say

== Demographics ==
The population of Champagne-Ardenne has been in steady decrease since 1982 due to a rural exodus. With 1.3 million people and a density of 52/km^{2}, it is one of France's least populated regions. After a brief period of stabilization in the 1990s, the region's population is now among the fastest "dying" in Europe, with several municipalities losing people at a faster rate than many Eastern European areas, especially in the department of Haute-Marne. The region is among the oldest in France, has a weak fertility rate, and its immigrant population is minimal compared to the national average.

== Major communities ==
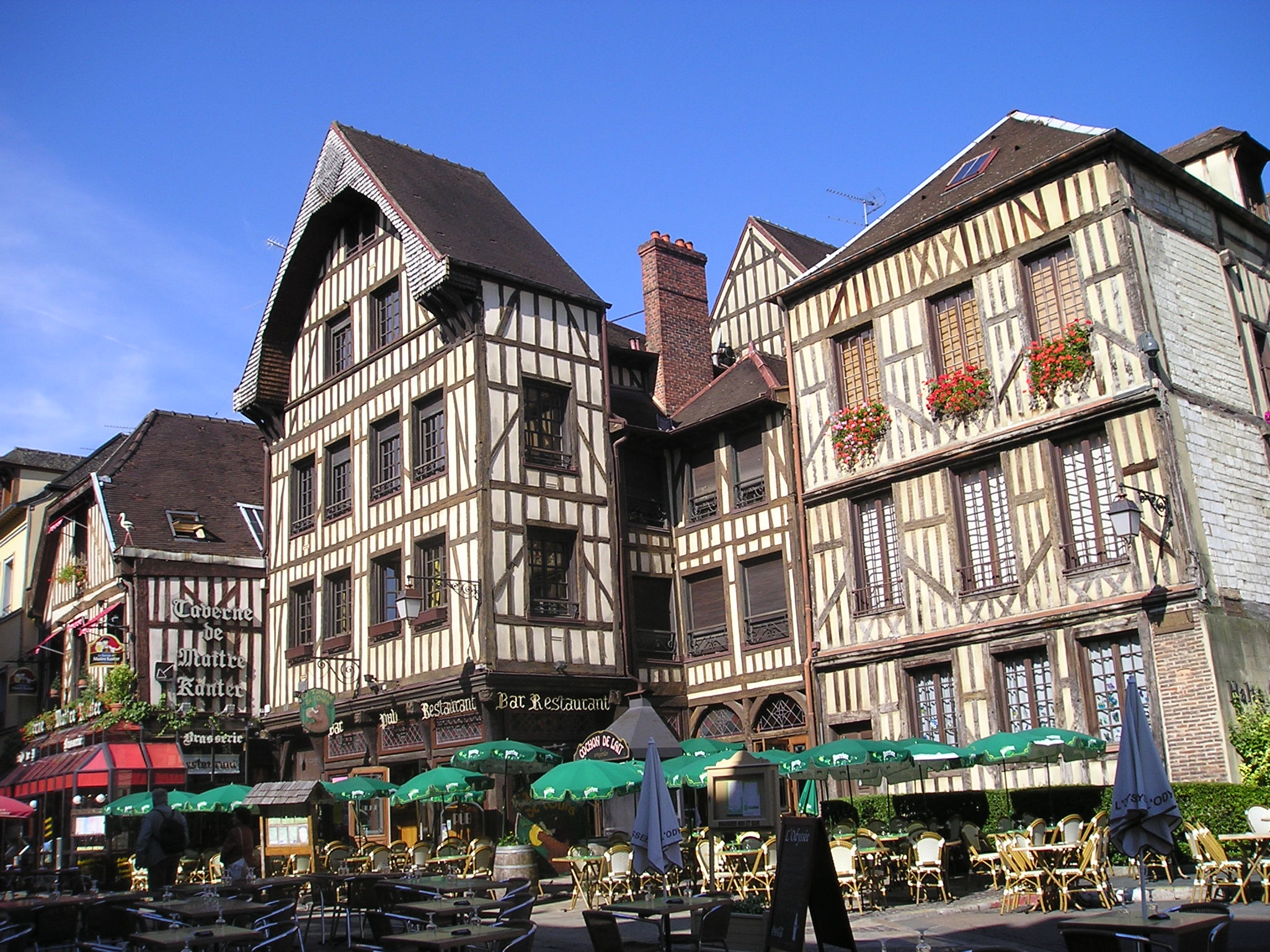
City center, Troyes

- Châlons-en-Champagne
- Charleville-Mézières
- Chaumont
- Épernay
- Reims
- Saint-Dizier
- Sedan
- Troyes

== See also ==
Coat of arms of the ancient county of Champagne.

- Ardennes
- Champagne Riots
- Champagne (historical province)
