= The British in India: A Social History of the Raj =

2018 book by David Gilmour

- Editors: David Gilmour
- Language: English
- Subject: History
- Genre: Nonfiction
- Published: 13 November 2018
- Publisher: Farrar, Straus and Giroux
- Media type: Hardcover
- Pages: 640
- ISBN: 978-0374116859

The British in India: A Social History of the Raj is a nonfiction book by David Gilmour, a British historian.

== Background ==
The book paints a vivid picture of British people living in India from the seventeenth century until the country's independence in 1947.

== Reception ==
Isaac Chotiner, writing for The New York Times suggests, "With [The Book], Gilmour, metaphorical microscope in hand, has written a broad-ranging but precise and intimate examination of the British men and women who served and lived on the subcontinent."

Lomarsh Roopnarine, a Professor of Latin American and Caribbean Studies at Jackson State University in his review of the book wrote at The Historian (journal), "The author navigates the social lives of about 150,000 servicemen and women without replicating the previously explored themes of British Raj."
