= Curzon: Imperial Statesman =

1994 book by David Gilmour

- Author: David Gilmour
- Language: English
- Subject: George Curzon
- Genre: biography
- Publisher: John Murray
- Publication date: 1994
- Publication place: United Kingdom
- Pages: 684
- ISBN: 0719548349

Curzon: Imperial Statesman is a 1994 book by the British historian David Gilmour. It is a biography about the politician George Curzon.

The book received the Duff Cooper Prize.
