= Kenneth Rose =

Journalist and royal biographer in the United Kingdom

- Born: 15 November 1924
- Died: 28 January 2014 (aged 89)
- Occupations: Journalist; Biographer

Kenneth Vivian Rose CBE FRSL (15 November 1924 – 28 January 2014) was a British journalist and royal biographer. The son of Ada and Jacob Rosenwige, a Bradford Jewish surgeon, Rose was educated at Repton and New College, Oxford. He served in the Welsh Guards 1943–6 and was attached to Phantom, 1945. He did a brief spell of teaching as an Assistant Master at Eton College, 1948. His journalistic career began when he joined the Editorial Staff of the Daily Telegraph, a position he held from 1952 to 1960. He founded and wrote the Albany Column, 1961–97, for the Sunday Telegraph.

Rose won the Whitbread Book Award in the biography category in 1983 for his book, King George V. He shared that award with Victoria Glendinning, who won for her book Vita. He was appointed CBE in the 1997 New Year Honours.

Two well-regarded volumes of Rose's journals edited by DR Thorpe were published in 2018 and 2019. A review in The Spectator by biographer Philip Ziegler said: 'He was, of course, a snob — nobody could write a social column in the Sunday Telegraph for more than 50 years without some snobbish instincts — but he was an intelligent one, singularly well-informed, and capable from time to time of administering a sharp bite to the noble hands that fed him his material. It might reasonably be said that his contribution to social history is limited in its parameters, but it is a real contribution for all that. It is also great fun to read'.

== Selected works ==
- Superior Person: A Portrait of Curzon and His Circle in late Victorian England (Weidenfeld & Nicolson, London 1969)
- The Later Cecils (Weidenfeld & Nicolson, 1975)
- William Harvey 1578-1657 (The Gilbey Jubilee Collection, 1978), a monograph
- King George V (Weidenfeld & Nicolson, 1983), awarded the Wolfson History Prize ISBN 0-297-78245-2
- Kings, Queens & Courtiers: Intimate Portraits of the Royal House of Windsor from its Foundation to the Present Day (Weidenfeld & Nicolson, 1985); US edition: Who’s Who in the Royal House of Windsor (Crescent, 1985)
- Elusive Rothschild: The Life of Victor, Third Baron (Weidenfeld & Nicolson, 2003)
- Who's In, Who's Out. The Journals of Kenneth Rose. Vol. 1, 1944–1979. Edited by D. R. Thorpe (Weidenfeld & Nicolson, London 2018) ISBN 978-1-47-460154-2
- Who Wins, Who Loses. The Journals of Kenneth Rose. Vol. 2, 1979–2014. Edited by D. R. Thorpe (Weidenfeld & Nicolson, London 2019) ISBN 978-1-47-461058-2
