= Marsh Biography Award =

British literary award

The Marsh Biography Award was a British literary award, given to the author of the best biography written in the previous two years by a British author. It was established in 1987 and was presented biennially until 2011. The Marsh Christian Trust and the English Speaking Union presented this award in partnership.

== Winners ==
- 1987 - Roland Huntford - Shackleton
- 1989 - David Gilmour - The Last Leopard
- 1991 - Hugh & Mirabel Cecil - Clever Hearts
- 1993 - Patrick Marnham - The Man Who Wasn't Maigret
- 1995 - Selina Hastings - Evelyn Waugh: A Biography
- 1997 - Jim Ring - Erskine Childers
- 1999 - Richard Holmes - Coleridge: Darker Reflections
- 2001 - Anthony Sampson - Mandela: The Authorised Biography
- 2003 - Brenda Maddox - Rosalind Franklin: The Dark Lady of DNA
- 2005 - John Guy - My Heart is My Own: The Life of Mary Queen of Scots
- 2007 - Maggie Fergusson - George Mackay Brown: A Life
- 2009 - Rosemary Hill - God’s Architect: Pugin and the Building of Romantic Britain
- 2011 - D.R. Thorpe - Supermac: The Life of Harold Macmillan
