= Helen H. Carr =

British historian, presenter and author (born 1988)

Helen H. Carr FRHistS
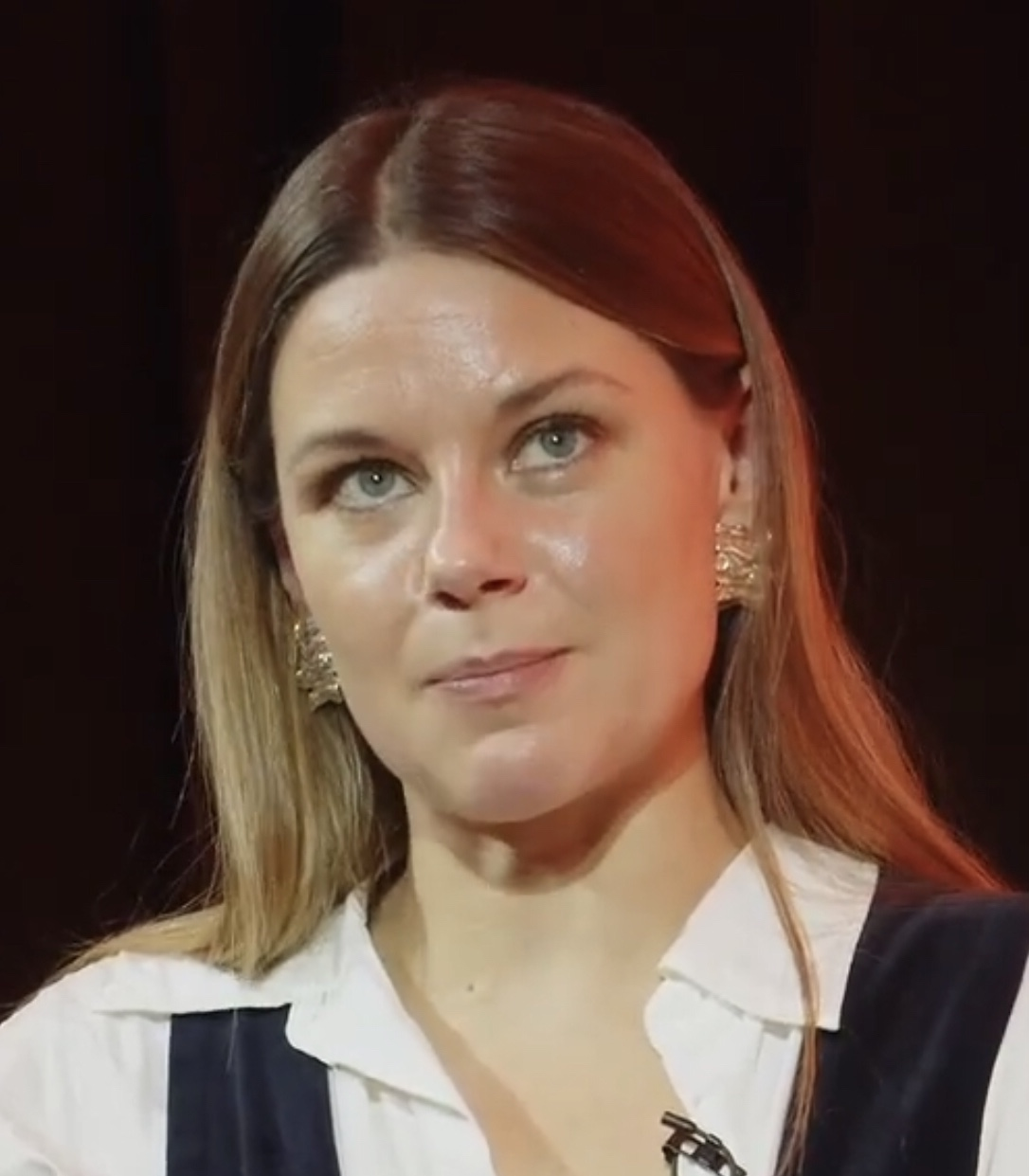
- Carr in 2024
- Born: Helen Maria Hallett Carr; 18 December 1988 (age 37); Peterborough, England
- Education: University of York; University of Reading; Queen Mary University of London (current)
- Occupation: Historian
- Spouse: Henry Charlton-Weedy
- Relatives: E. H. Carr (great-grandfather)
- Writing career
- Genre: Non-fiction
- Subject: Medieval England

Helen Maria Hallett Carr (born 18 December 1988) is a writer and historian of Medieval England.

== Early life and education ==
Carr was born in Peterborough. She has an undergraduate degree in History of Art from the University of York, graduating in 2010 and a Research Master's degree in Medieval History from the University of Reading graduating in 2014. She is currently working on a PhD at Queen Mary University London under the supervision of Professor Miri Rubin. She is married to Henry Charlton-Weedy.

== Career ==
=== Writer/producer ===
Carr has presented several documentaries for HistoryHit TV, including Captain Cook's Endeavour and The Trail of Guy Fawkes.

Carr has appeared as an expert on Richard II as part of the Medieval Kings series and presented a documentary for Cambridge University on its history, shared globally.

She has produced history documentaries for BBC4, BBC2, SkyArts, Discovery, CNN and HistoryHit TV and has worked on BBC Radio 4’s In Our Time.

Carr is a regular features writer for BBC History magazine and History Extra. She has also contributed to the New Statesman, The TLS, The Spectator and History Today.

Between 2019 and 2021, Carr produced and presented the podcast Hidden Histories.

Carr covered the death and funeral of Queen Elizabeth II for Sky News Australia and City News TV Canada in September 2022 and the coronation of King Charles III for CNN, NBC and CityNews in May 2023.

=== Author ===
In April 2021, Carr published her first book, The Red Prince: John of Gaunt Duke of Lancaster (Oneworld, 2021). This title was featured as a Times and Sunday Times best book of 2021 and became a Times best-seller in March 2022.

The Red Prince: John of Gaunt Duke of Lancaster was shortlisted for the 2022 Elizabeth Longford Prize for Historical Biography in May 2022.

Carr is the co-author and editor of What Is History, Now? (W&N), alongside Professor Suzannah Lipscomb. This book, published in September 2021 by Weidenfeld & Nicolson was a follow-up to What Is History? (1961), the seminal work by her great-grandfather, the historian and diplomat E. H. Carr. According to historian Dan Snow:

"Helen Carr is one of the most exciting and talented young historians out there. She has a passion for medieval history which is infectious and is always energetic and engaging, whether on the printed page or the screen."

Carr's next book, This England, will be published by Hutchinson Heinemann (Penguin Random House) in 2024.

In July 2022, Carr was elected a fellow of the Royal Historical Society
