= Timothy J. G. Harris =

Historian and academic

- Born: 1958 (age 67–68)
- Occupations: Historian and academic
- Title: Munro-Goodwin-Wilkinson Professor of European History
- Children: 2

Academic background
- Education: University of Cambridge
- Doctoral advisor: Mark Goldie

Academic work
- Discipline: History
- Sub-discipline: Early modern Britain; Stuart period; Political history
- Institutions: Emmanuel College, Cambridge; Brown University

Timothy J. G. Harris (born 1958) is a British historian of later Stuart Britain and the Munro-Goodwin-Wilkinson Professor of European History at Brown University.

== Life and career ==
A native of London, Tim Harris was educated at the University of Cambridge, from which he received a BA (1980), MA (1984), and PhD (1985). From 1983 to 1986, he was a fellow at Emmanuel College, Cambridge. His doctoral dissertation was published by Cambridge University Press as London Crowds in the Reign of Charles II in 1987. Mark Goldie was his doctoral supervisor.

Since 1986, Harris has been a member of the faculty of the Department of History at Brown University. There, he was an assistant professor from 1986 to 1990; an associate professor from 1990 to 1995; a full professor from 1995; and has been the Munro-Goodwin-Wilkinson Professor in European History from 2004 to the present. In 2000, while on sabbatical leave from Brown, Harris held a Charter visiting fellowship at Wolfson College, Oxford.

Harris' work has focused on the intersection of high politics with popular politics; popular protest; popular religion; and politics in the Kingdom of England, the Kingdom of Ireland, and the Kingdom of Scotland. His work has mainly focused on the reigns of Charles II of England, James VII and II of Scotland and England, William III of England and Mary II of England, and Anne, Queen of Great Britain.

Harris is an editor of the book series Studies in Early Modern Cultural, Political and Social History for Boydell & Brewer, and sits on the editorial board of the journal The European Legacy.

== Personal life ==
Harris has two children with his wife, Beth.

== Publications ==
=== Books ===
- London Crowds in the Reign of Charles II (Cambridge University Press, 1987).
- Ed., The Politics of Religion in Restoration England 1660-1688, editor with Mark Goldie and Paul Seaward (Basil Blackwell, 1990)
- Politics under the Later Stuarts: Party Conflict in a Divided Society, 1660-1715 (Longman, 1993).
- Ed., Popular Culture in England, c. 1500-1850 (Macmillan / St. Martin's Press, 1995).
- Ed., The Politics of the Excluded, c. 1500-1850 (Palgrave, 2001).
- Restoration: Charles II and His Kingdoms, 1660-1685 (Allen Lane, 2005).
- Revolution: The Great Crisis of the British Monarchy, 1685-1720 (Allen Lane, 2006).
- Ed., The Entring Book of Roger Morrice, 1677-1691, 7 vols., editor with Mark Goldie (Boydell Press, Woodbridge, 2007, 2009)
- Ed., The Final Crisis of the Stuart Monarchy: The Revolutions of 1688-91 in their British, Atlantic and European Contexts, editor with Stephen Taylor (Boydell, 2013).
- Rebellion: Britain's First Stuart Kings, 1567-1642 (Oxford University Press, 2014)
- Politics Under the Later Stuarts: Party Conflict in a Divided Society 1660-1715 (Routledge, 2015)

=== Articles & contributions ===
- "The Bawdy House Riots of 1668", Historical Journal, 29, 3 (1986), pp. 537–556.
- "Was the Tory Reaction Popular?: Attitudes of Londoners toward the Persecution of Dissent, 1681-1686", London Journal, 13, 2 (1988), pp. 106–120.
- "Talking with Christopher Hill", in G. Eley and W. Hunt, eds., Reviving the English Revolution: Reflections and Elaborations on the Work of Christopher Hill (Verso, 1988), pp. 99–103, 343–345.
- "The Problem of 'Popular Political Culture' in Seventeenth-Century London", History of European Ideas, Vol. 10, No. 1 (1989), pp. 43–58.
- "London Crowds and the Revolution of 1688", in Eveline Cruickshanks, ed., By Force or By Default? The Revolution of 1688 (John Donald, 1989), pp. 44–64.
- "Enrico VIII", Storia e Dossier (October, 1991), pp. 67–97.
- "From Rage of Party to Age of Oligarchy? Re-thinking the later Stuart and early Hanoverian Period", Journal of Modern History, 64 (1992), pp. 700–720.
- "Un Parlamento Contro Il Re: Alle origini della guerra civile inglese", Storia e Dossier (November, 1992), pp. 67–97.
- "Tories and the Rule of Law in the Reign of Charles II", The Seventeenth Century, 8, 1 (1993), pp. 9–27.
- "Party Turns? Or, Whigs and Tories Get Off Scott Free", Albion, 25, 4 (1993), pp. 581–590.
- "Sobering Thoughts, But the Party is Not Yet Over: A Reply", Albion, 25, 4 (1993), pp. 645–647.
- "Propaganda and Public Opinion in Seventeenth-Century England", in Jeremy Popkin, ed., Media and Revolution: Comparative Perspectives (University of Kentucky Press, 1995), pp. 48–73.
- "The Civil War and its Aftermath", The European Legacy, I, 8 (December, 1996), pp. 2284–2289.
- "What’s New About the Restoration?", Albion, 29, 2 (1997), pp. 187–222.
- "The Parties and the People: The Press, the Crowd and Politics 'Out-of-Doors' in Restoration England" in Lionel Glassey, ed., The Reigns of Charles II and James VII and II (Macmillan, 1997), pp. 125–51.
- "Reluctant Revolutionaries? The Scots and the Revolution of 1688-9", in Howard Nenner, ed., Politics and the Political Imagination in Later Stuart Britain: Essays Presented to Lois Green Schwoerer (University of Rochester Press / Boydell and Brewer, 1997), pp. 97–117.
- "The British Dimension, Religion, and the Shaping of Political Identities during the Reign of Charles II", in Tony Claydon and Ian McBride, eds., Protestantism and National Identity: Britain and Ireland, c. 1650-c.1850 (Cambridge University Press, 1998), pp. 131–56.
- "The People, the Law and the Constitution in Scotland and England: A Comparative Approach to the Glorious Revolution", Journal of British Studies, 38 (January, 1999), pp. 28–58.
- "The Autonomy of English History?", in Glenn Burgess, ed., The New British History c. 1500-1707: A Reader (I. B. Tauris, 1999), pp. 266–86.
- "The Legacy of the English Civil War: Rethinking the Revolution", The European Legacy, 5 (2000), pp. 501–14.
- "Understanding Popular Politics in Restoration Britain", in Alan Houston and Steven C. A. Pincus, eds, A Nation Transformed: England after the Restoration (Cambridge University Press, 2001), pp. 125–53.
- "The Leveller Legacy: From the Restoration to the Exclusion Crisis", in Michael Mendle, ed., The Putney Debates of 1647: The Army, the Levellers, and the English State (Cambridge University Press, 2001), pp. 219–40.
- "Perceptions of the Crowd in later-Stuart London", in J. F. Merritt, ed., Imagining Early Modern London: Perceptions and Portrayals of the City from Stow to Strype, 1598-1720 (Cambridge University Press, 2001), pp. 250–72.
- "Incompatible Revolutions?: The Established Church and the Revolutions of 1688-89 in Ireland, England and Scotland", in Allan I. Macinnes and Jane Ohlmeyer eds., The Stuart Kingdoms in the Seventeenth Century (Four Courts Press, Dublin, 2002), pp. 204–225.
- "The Augustan House of Commons", Parliamentary History, 23 (2004), pp. 375–85.
- "The Reality Behind the Merry Monarchy", History Today, 55 (June 2005), 40–45.
- "In Search of a British History of Political Thought", in David Armitage ed., British Political Thought in History, Literature and Theory, 1500-1800 (Cambridge University Press, 2006), pp. 89–108.
- "Politics, Religion and Community in Later Stuart Ireland", in Robert Armstrong, ed., Community in early modern Ireland (Four Courts Press, Dublin, 2006), pp. 51–68.
- "James II, the Glorious Revolution, and the Destiny of Britain", Historical Journal, 51, 3 (2008), 763–75.
- "'There is none that loves him but drunk whores and whoremongers': Popular Criticisms of the Restoration Court", in Julia Marciari-Alexander and Catherine Macleod, eds., Politics, Transgression, and Representation at the Court of Charles II (Yale University Press, New Haven, 2008), pp. 33–56.
- "Restoration Ireland: Themes and Problems", in Coleman Dennehy, ed., Restoration Ireland: Always Settling and Never Settled (Ashgate, 2008), pp. 1–17.
- "'A Sainct in Shewe, a Devill in Deede': Moral Panics and anti-Puritanism in Seventeenth-Century England", in David Lemmings, ed., Moral Panics, the Press and the Law in Early Modern England (Palgrave, 2009), pp. 97–116.
- "The Ends of Life and the Rise of Modernity", Journal of Interdisciplinary History, 41:3 (2010–11), 421–33.
- "Popular, Plebeian, Culture: Historical Definitions", in Joad Raymond, ed., The Oxford History of Popular Print Culture, Volume 1: Beginnings to 1660 (Oxford University Press, 2011), pp. 50–8.
- "England’s 'little sisters without breasts': Shaftesbury and Scotland and Ireland", in John Spurr, ed., Anthony Ashley Cooper, The First Earl of Shaftesbury 1621-1683 (Ashgate, 2011), pp. 183–205.
