= Elizabeth Longford Prize =

British biography award

The Elizabeth Longford Prize for Historical Biography was established in 2003 in memory of Elizabeth Longford (1906-2002), the British author, biographer and historian. The £5,000 prize is awarded annually for a historical biography published in the preceding year.

The Elizabeth Longford Prize is sponsored by Flora Fraser and Peter Soros and administered by the Society of Authors.

== Winners ==
=== 2020s ===
2026

- Winner: Clare Jackson for The Mirror of Great Britain: A Life of James VI & I (Allen Lane)

Shortlist:

- Richard Bassett for Maria Theresa: Empress: The Making of the Austrian Enlightenment (Yale Press)
- Matthew Cobb for Crick: A Mind in Motion - from DNA to the Brain (Profile Books)
- Andrew Graham-Dixon for Vermeer: A Life Lost and Found (Allen Lane)
- Ann Schmiesing for The Brothers Grimm: A Biography (Yale Press)

2025

- Winner: Augustus the Strong: Tim Blanning for A Study in Artistic Greatness and Political Fiasco (Allen Lane)

Shortlist:

- Stephen Alford for All His Spies: The Secret World of Robert Cecil (Allen Lane)
- Helen Castor for The Eagle and the Hart: The Tragedy of Richard II and Henry IV (Allen Lane)
- Dan Jones for Henry V: The Astonishing Rise of England’s Greatest Warrior King (Apollo)
- Adam Shatz for The Rebel’s Clinic: The Revolutionary Lives of Frantz Fanon (Apollo)

2024

- Winner: Jackie Wullschläger for Monet: The Restless Vision (Allen Lane)

Shortlist:

- Deborah E. Lipstadt for Golda Meir: Israel’s Matriarch (Yale Press)
- Kal Raustiala The Absolutely Indispensable Man: Ralph Bunche, the United Nations, and the Fight to End Empire (Oxford University Press)
- M.W. Rowe for J.L. Austin:Philosopher and D-Day Intelligence Officer (Oxford University Press)
- Jackie Uí Chionna for Queen of Codes: The Secret Life of Emily Anderson, Britain’s Greatest Female Code Breaker (Headline)

2023

- Winner: Ramachandra Guha for Rebels Against the Raj: Western Fighters for India’s Freedom (William Collins)

Shortlist:

- Leanda de Lisle for Henrietta Maria: Conspirator, Warrior, Phoenix Queen (Chatto & Windus) Vintage Books
- Michael Broers for Napoleon: The Decline and Fall of an Empire 1811-1821 (Pegasus Books)
- Ruth Harris for Guru to the World: The Life and Legacy of Vivekananda (Harvard University Press)
- Daisy Hay for Dinner With Joseph Johnson: Books and Friendship in a Revolutionary Age (Vintage Books)

2022

- Winner: Andrew Roberts for George III: The Life and Reign of Britain’s Most Misunderstood Monarch (Allen Lane)

Shortlist:

- Timothy Brennan for Places of Mind, A Life of Edward Said (Bloomsbury)
- Helen Carr for The Red Prince: The Life of John of Gaunt, the Duke of Lancaster (Oneworld Publications)
- Jonathan Petropoulos for Göring's Man in Paris: The Story of A Nazi Art Plunderer and His World (Yale University Press)
- Jane Ridley for George V: Never a Dull Moment (Chatto & Windus)

2021

- Winner: Fredrik Logevall for JFK: Vol 1 (Penguin Books)

Shortlist:

- Sudhir Hazareesingh for Black Spartacus: The Epic Life of Toussaint Louverture (Allen King)
- Sarah LeFanu for Something of Themselves: Kipling, Kingsley, Conan Doyle and the Anglo-Boer War (Hurst)
- Samanth Subramanian for A Dominant Character: The Radical Science and Restless Politics of J.B.S Haldane (Atlantic)

2020

- Winner: D W. Hayton for Conservative Revolutionary: The Lives of Lewis Namier

Shortlist:

- Andrew S. Curran for Diderot and the Art of Thinking Freely
- Richard J. Evans for Eric Hobsbawm: A Life in History
- Oliver Soden for Michael Tippett: The Biography
- A. N. Wilson for Prince Albert: The Man Who Saved the Monarchy

=== 2010s ===
2019

- Winner: Julian Jackson for A Certain Idea of France: The Life of Charles de Gaulle

Shortlist:

- Diarmaid MacCulloch for Thomas Cromwell: A Life
- Andrew Roberts for Churchill: Walking with Destiny
- Jeffrey C. Stewart for The New Negro: The Life of Alain Locke

2018

- Giles Tremlett for Isabella of Castile: Europe's First Great Queen

2017

- John Bew for Citizen Clem: A Biography of Attlee

2016

- Andrew Gailey for The Lost Imperialist: Lord Dufferin, Memory and Mythmaking in an Age of Celebrity

2015

- Ben Macintyre for A Spy Among Friends: Kim Philby and the Great Betrayal

2014

- Charles Moore for Margaret Thatcher: The Authorized Biography. Volume 1

2013

- Anne Somerset for Queen Anne: The Politics of Passion

2012

- Frances Wilson for How to Survive the Titanic or The Sinking of J. Bruce Ismay

2011

- Philip Ziegler for Edward Heath (bio of Edward Heath)

2010

- Tristram Hunt for The Frock-Coated Communist - The Revolutionary Life of Friedrich Engels

=== 2000s ===
2009

- Mark Bostridge for Florence Nightingale. The Woman and Her Legend

2008

- Rosemary Hill for God's Architect: Pugin and the Building of Romantic Britain

2007

- Jessie Childs for Henry VIII's Last Victim: The Life and Times of Henry Howard, Earl of Surrey

2006

- Charles Williams for Petain: How the Hero of France Became a Convicted Traitor and Changed the Course of History

2005

- Ian Kershaw for Making Friends with Hitler: Lord Londonderry, the Nazis, and the Road to War

2004

- Katie Whitaker for Mad Madge: Margaret Cavendish, Duchess of Newcastle, Royalist, Writer and Romantic

2003

- David Gilmour for The Long Recessional: The Imperial Life of Rudyard Kipling
