= Giles Tremlett =

British journalist

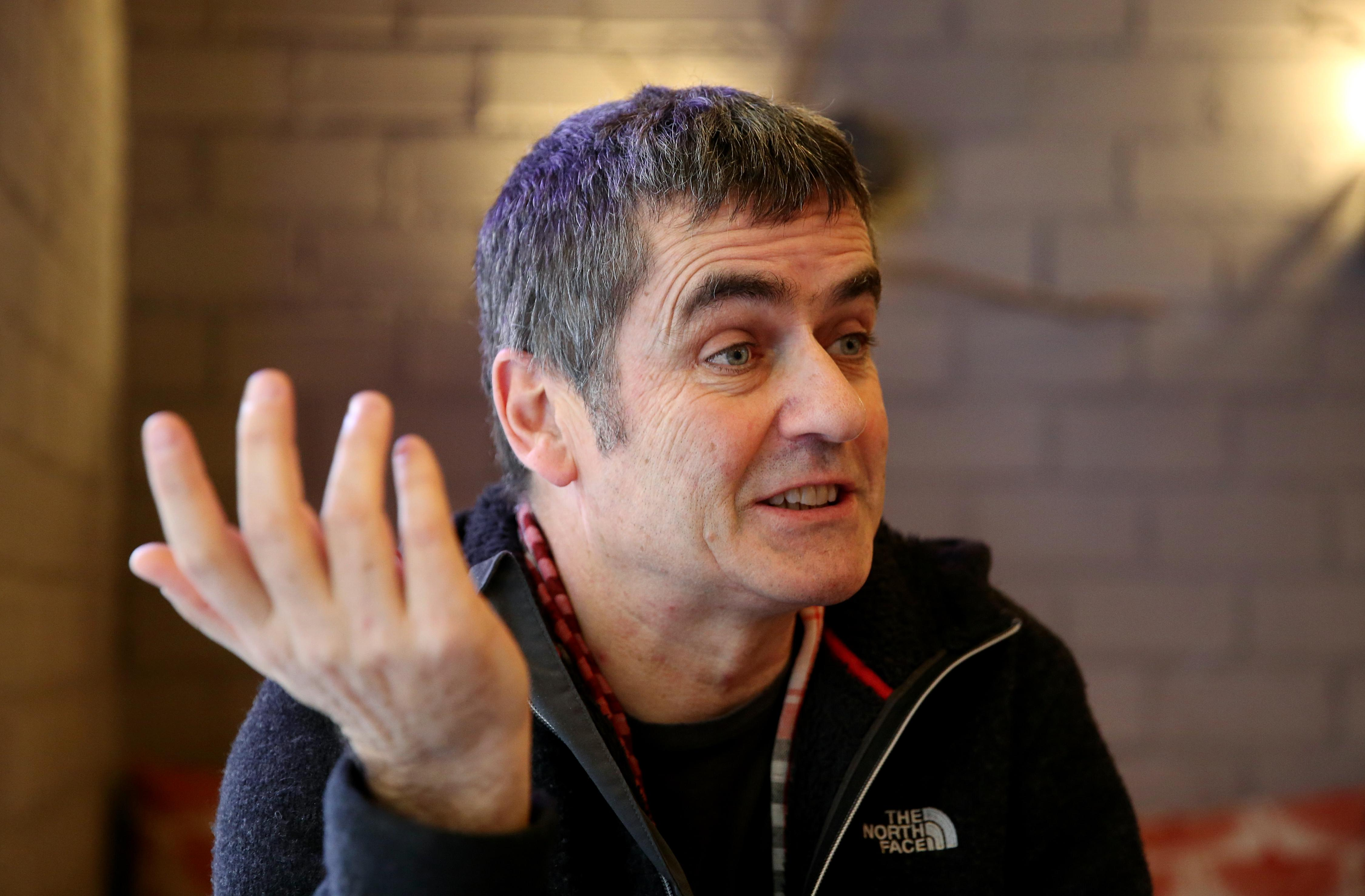
Tremlett in 2017

Giles E.H. Tremlett (born 1962 in Plymouth) is a historian, author and journalist based in Madrid, Spain.

Tremlett is author of five works of history and non-fiction that have been translated into half a dozen languages. He won the Elizabeth Longford Prize for Historical Biography in 2018. He has held various roles for The Guardian, including as chief correspondent in Iberia and as a Long Reads writer. He previously wrote for The Economist. He was a Visiting Fellow at the London School of Economics for five years from 2016.

== Biography ==
He graduated in Human Sciences at the University of Oxford in 1984 and has also studied at the Universities of Barcelona and Lisbon.

He lived in Barcelona for two years in the mid-1980s. After a period in London he returned to Spain in the mid-1990s. He was The Guardian's correspondent for Spain, Portugal and the Maghreb for a dozen years. He was Madrid correspondent for The Economist for a decade until 2016. In 2012 he was voted Correspondent of the Year by the Madrid International Press Club. He has been a regular current affairs commentator for Spanish broadcasters, including state-owned TVE television, La Sexta and the country's biggest radio station, Cadena SER, as well as contributing to newspapers like El País or El Mundo. He was co-founder and curator of the Docubeats documentary project at The Guardian and El País.

He has been a guest lecturer on journalism or contemporary Spanish history and participant in seminars at numerous universities, including Oxford, MIT and Stanford.

== Major works ==
His book Ghosts of Spain: Travels through a country's hidden past (2007) was translated into five languages.

In 2010 he published a biography of Catherine of Aragon, the Spanish infanta who became Henry VIII's first wife, with Faber and Faber in London and Walker in New York. Catherine of Aragon was BBC Radio 4's "Book of the Week" and was short-listed for the HW Fisher Best First Biography Prize. It has been translated into Spanish, Russian and Polish.

His biography of Isabella of Castile – the Spanish queen who sent Columbus to the Americas – was published in 2017. It won the Elizabeth Longford Prize in 2018. It was a top-selling history book in Spain in 2018 and has also been translated into Portuguese and Chinese.

In October 2020 he published The International Brigades: Fascism, Freedom and the Spanish Civil War, which was a Guardian newspaper "book of the Day". It draws on archive material held in Moscow and recently made available to historians. According to the historian Sir Paul Preston, it provides "in lucid and compelling prose, the overall history of the Brigades that has been lacking". In popular media opinions differ from generally favourable though warning that the volume might seem "overly sympathetic to the Brigades", to the statement that "this book is as close to a definitive history as we are likely to get".

== Bibliography ==
El Generalisimo. Franco. Power, violence and the Quest for Greatness

Bloomsbury Publishing

ISBN 978--1-5266-5195-2

- Ghosts of Spain Faber and Faber. ISBN 978-0-571-22169-1
- Catherine of Aragon Walker & Company. ISBN 978-0-8027-7916-8
- Isabella of Castile Bloomsbury ISBN 978-1408853979
- The International Brigades: Fascism, Freedom and the Spanish Civil War Bloomsbury ISBN 978-1408854006
- España: A Brief History Head of Zeus ISBN 978-1789544381
