= The Last Leopard =

1988 biography by David Gilmour

- Author: David Gilmour
- Language: English
- Subject: Giuseppe Tomasi di Lampedusa
- Genre: biography
- Publisher: Quartet Books
- Publication date: 1988
- Publication place: United Kingdom
- Pages: 223
- ISBN: 0704325640

The Last Leopard: A Life of Giuseppe Tomasi di Lampedusa is a biography of the Italian writer Giuseppe Tomasi di Lampedusa, written by the English historian David Gilmour. It was published by Quartet Books in 1988.

Herbert Mitgang of The New York Times described the book as well-researched and fascinating. He wrote that its only flaw is that it "avoids any real critical judgment of Lampedusa's dilettantism, his approval of Mussolini's military adventures, and his desire for a revival of the moribund Italian monarchy". The book received the 1989 Marsh Biography Award.
