= D. R. Thorpe =

British historian and biographer (1943–2023)

David Richard Thorpe, MBE, FRHistS (12 March 1943 – 2 February 2023) was a British historian and biographer of three Prime Ministers of the United Kingdom during the mid-20th century; Sir Anthony Eden, Alec Douglas-Home and Harold Macmillan.

== Biography ==
Thorpe was educated at Fettes College, Edinburgh and Selwyn College, Cambridge. He taught history at Charterhouse, a public school in Surrey, for over 30 years. Among other academic appointments, he was an Archives Fellow of Churchill College, Cambridge, and a fellow of St Antony's College, Oxford and Brasenose College, Oxford.

== Works ==
Thorpe's first book, The Uncrowned Prime Ministers (1980), examined the careers of Austen Chamberlain, Lord Curzon and R. A. Butler, three men who came close to reaching the "top of the greasy pole" (Disraeli's phrase, applied by Thorpe to Home's ascent to the premiership). He was subsequently the official biographer of the former Foreign Secretary, Chancellor of the Exchequer and Speaker of the House of Commons Selwyn Lloyd (1989) and of Alec Douglas-Home (1996) and Anthony Eden (2003).

As with Sir Robert Rhodes James's earlier official biography of Eden (1986), Thorpe's, which was undertaken at the invitation of Eden's widow, Clarissa, in 1991, did much to restore Eden's reputation, which had suffered considerably in the aftermath of the Suez Crisis of 1956. Indeed, a feature of Thorpe’s biographical trilogy was that all three subjects, though having each held two of the three great offices of the British state (Eden and Home, in addition to being prime minister, both served more than one term as Foreign Secretary), tended, in retrospect, to be underestimated. Lloyd was remembered as Eden’s compliant Foreign Secretary at the time of Suez who, as chancellor, was dismissed ignominiously by Harold Macmillan in a major Cabinet reshuffle (the so-called "Night of the Long Knives") in 1962; Home, then a hereditary peer, seemed to many an unlikely choice to succeed Macmillan as prime minister in 1963 and narrowly lost a general election less than a year later; and Eden, though widely admired for his work at the Foreign Office, attracted, after his short, but momentous premiership, the famous judgement of Tacitus on the Roman Emperor Galba, Omnium consensu capax imperii nisi imperasset ("All would have pronounced him worthy of empire if he had never been emperor").

After completing Eden, Thorpe began work on a biography of Harold Macmillan, which was published by Chatto & Windus in 2010. It was described by Vernon Bogdanor, Professor of Government at Oxford University, as 'the best biography of a post-war British Prime Minister yet written.' The book was one of the six books (from a record 213 entries) shortlisted for the prestigious Orwell Prize for political writing in 2010, and in 2011 was awarded the biennial English Speaking Union Marsh Biography Award.

== Awards and honours ==
- 2011 Marsh Biography Award, Supermac: A Life of Harold Macmillan
- 2013 Fellow of the Royal Historical Society (FRHistS).

== Bibliography ==
- The Uncrowned Prime Ministers (1980)
- Selwyn Lloyd (1989)
- Alec Douglas-Home (1996)
- Eden: The Life and Times Of Anthony Eden, First Earl of Avon 1897–1977 (2003)
- Supermac: The Life of Harold Macmillan (2010)
- Who's In, Who's Out. The Journals of Kenneth Rose. Vol. 1, 1944–1979, editor (2018)
- Who Wins, Who Loses. The Journals of Kenneth Rose. Vol. 2, 1979–2014, editor (2019)
