= The Late Monsieur Gallet =

1931 novel by Georges Simenon

- Author: Georges Simenon
- Original title: French: Monsieur Gallet, décédé
- Language: French
- Series: Inspector Jules Maigret
- Genre: Detective fiction, Crime fiction
- Publication date: 1931
- Publication place: France
- Media type: Print
- Preceded by: Pietr the Latvian
- Followed by: The Hanged Man of Saint-Pholien

The Late Monsieur Gallet (French: Monsieur Gallet, décédé) is a detective novel by Belgian writer Georges Simenon. It is the first novel featuring Detective Chief Inspector Jules Maigret of the Paris judicial police to have been published in book form. The novel involves Maigret's investigation of the murder of a travelling salesman who had been leading a double life. It has been translated into English three times and adapted for film and television three times.

== Plot ==
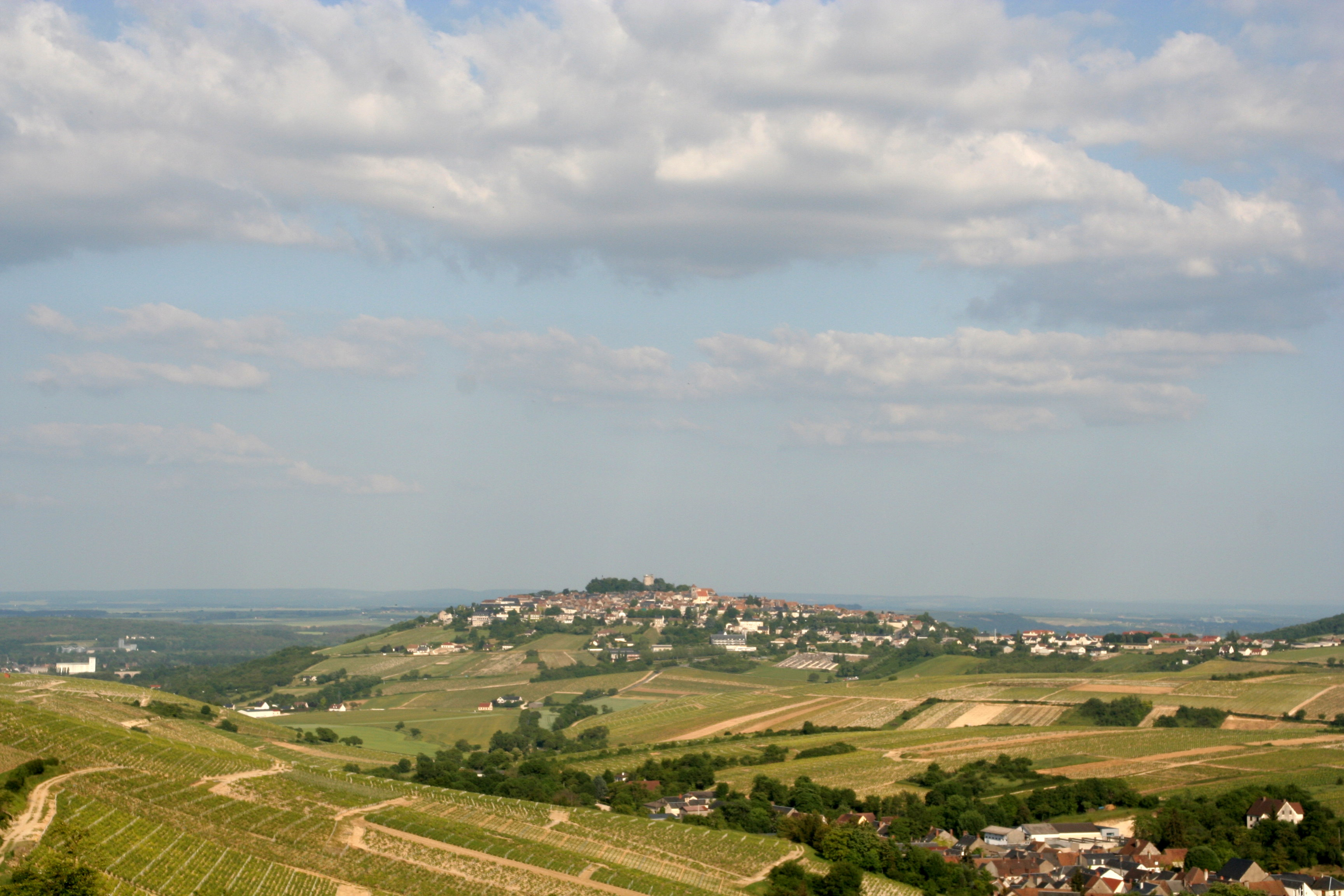
Sancerre

Detective Chief Inspector Maigret of the French judicial police travels to Sancerre to investigate the murder of Émile Gallet, a travelling salesman whose body was found in a hotel room. He was shot in the face from a distance of seven metres through the open window of his room. The shot was not fatal; death came from a stab wound to the heart soon after.

Maigret discovers that Gallet had been leading a double life: telling his wife that he was selling cheap silverware in Normandy when he was actually staying in the hotel in Sancerre under the name Clément. Gallet also received letters from a Monsieur Jacob that he concealed from his wife. Maigret is told that Gallet lived a quiet life and had few friends. His wife's family – all royalists and legitimists – shunned him because of his low-status job and lack of ambition.

Maigret learns that Gallet had met his son, Henry, in Sancerre on the day he died. Henry explains that it was a chance meeting; Henry was in Sancerre to visit his girlfriend, Éléanore Boursang. Maigret is told that Gallet also met with Tiburce de Saint-Hilaire, who lives in the château next door to the hotel. Maigret interviews Saint-Hilaire who says that he only knew Gallet slightly; Gallet had asked him for money for the legitimist cause on the day of his death.

Maigret finds clues suggesting that on the night he died, Gallet had climbed onto the wall of Saint-Hilaire's property at a point opposite the window of his hotel room. Gallet had also burnt a document in the fireplace of his room. Maigret discovers that six years earlier, Gallet had taken out a life insurance policy worth 300,000 francs. Maigret surmises that Gallet paid for the policy by stealing the funds royalists had contributed for the legitimist cause.

A forensic examination of the burnt document shows it was a letter from Jacob demanding 20,000 francs. Maigret finds out that Jacob is a newspaper vendor in Paris. Jacob tells him that a woman has been paying him for three years to receive mail on her behalf that she regularly collects from him. Maigret establishes that the woman is Éléanore Boursang and he surmises that Henry and Éléanore have discovered Gallet's secret and are blackmailing him.

A tax inspector tells Maigret that he knew Gallet when he was a young man in French Indochina. He describes him as gregarious, a lover of sports and a womaniser. A former employee of Saint-Hilaire tells Maigret that Gallet had been visiting Saint-Hilaire at his château about twice a year for 10 to 15 years.

Maigret suggests to Saint-Hilaire that Gallet was being blackmailed and needed 20,000 francs within two days. Having failed to get the money from Saint-Hilaire he decided to kill himself in a way that would look like he was murdered so that his wife could claim on his life insurance. He set up a pistol with an automatic firing device on a time delay on Saint-Hilaire's property. He then returned to his room and waited for the pistol to fire. The shot did not kill him, so he stabbed himself in the heart.

Maigret tells Saint-Hilaire that the tax inspector can verify Saint-Hilaire's true identity. Saint-Hilaire confesses that he is the real Émile Gallet. While working for a public notary in Indochina he learned that the real Saint-Hilaire would be the sole legatee of a rich relative in Indochina. He travelled to France and found that the real Saint-Hilaire was impoverished and unaware of his rich relative. He offered the real Saint-Hilaire 30,000 francs to swap identity papers so they could each start a new life. Several years later, the real Saint-Hilaire discovered the fraud and blackmailed him. However, after the statutory period for taking a civil action for fraud expired, he stopped paying the real Saint-Hilaire large sums.

After dismissing the bogus Saint-Hilaire, Maigret contemplates whether he should report the case truthfully as a suicide, in which case the dead man's widow would not be entitled to the life insurance payment. He reports the case as unsolved.

== Publication history ==
Monsieur Gallet, décédé was first published in 1931 in Paris by Fayard. The novel was the first featuring Inspector Maigret of the Paris judicial police to be published in book form. (Pietr the Latvian had been serialised the year before in the magazine Ric et Rac.) The book has been translated three times into English: in 1932 by Anthony Abbot as The Death of Monsieur Gallet, in 1963 as Maigret Stonewalled by Margaret Marshall, and in 2013 by Anthea Bell as The Late Monsieur Gallet.

== Adaptations ==
The novel has been adapted three times for film and television: in English in 1960 as A Man of Quality, with Rupert Davies in the main role; in French in 1956 as Monsieur Gallet, décédé, directed by Jean Faucher with Henri Norbert in the main role; and in French in 1987 as Monsieur Gallet, décédé, directed by Jean-Marie Coldefy with Jean Richard in the lead role.

== Bibliography ==
- Marnham, Patrick (1994). The Man Who Wasn't Maigret, a portrait of Georges Simenon. Harcourt Brace & Company. ISBN 0-15-600059-8.
- Simenon, Georges (1931). The Late Monsieur Gallet. Translated by Bell, Anthea. London: Penguin Classics. ISBN 9780141393377. ;
- Young, Trudee (1976). Georges Simenon, a checklist of his 'Maigret' and other mystery novels and short stories in French and in English translations. Metuchen, N.J.: The Scarecrow Press. ISBN 0-8108-0964-8.
