= Monet: The Restless Vision =

2023 biography by Jackie Wullschläger

- Author: Jackie Wullschläger
- Subject: The life of Claude Monet
- Published: 2023
- Publisher: Allen Lane
- Media type: book
- Pages: 576

Monet: The Restless Vision is a 2023 biography by Jackie Wullschläger. It charts the life of French impressionist painter Claude Monet.

== Background ==
Claude Monet was the third subject for the author, Jackie Wullschläger, who had previously written biographies of artist Marc Chagall and writer Hans Christian Andersen. Wullschläger is the chief visual arts critic for the Financial Times, having worked for the publication in a variety of roles since 1986.

== Reception ==
Writing in The New Yorker, Jackson Arn states that The Restless Vision "could be called an Impressionist biography of the central Impressionist". Arn was impressed with the way in which, according to him, details such as Monet's finances were made "sexy" in the book, writing "What others treat as mundane context Wullschläger...turns into full-on characterization". Arn mentions that the book can be "misty" but reflects that the same could be said of Monet.

Writing in the New York Times, Hugh Eakin writes that the book provides a "provocative explanation" for the initial lack of interest in Monet following his death. Eakin also highlights Wullschläger's argument that his relationships with three women: his first wife Camille Doncieux, his second wife Alice Hoschedé, and Alice's daughter Blanche, were key in his work, and that as the women sharing his life changed, so did his art. Eakin opines that this argument is a difficult one to make due to Monet's habit of destroying letters.

Writing in The Times, Laura Freeman calls the book "an intoxicating read" and praises the variety of perspectives that the book provides on Monet's life. In the Times Literary Supplement, Ruth Scurr focuses on the book's central argument on the role of the three women whom, Wullschläger argues, framed his artistic life. Scurr emphasises the grand ambition of the book but feels there were "rich sources" available to Wullschläger, given the fact that despite his destruction of letters he received, over 3,000 letters Monet sent have survived.

Monet: The Restless Vision won the Elizabeth Longford Prize for Historical Biography 2024.
