= Clare Jackson =

British historian and academic

Clare Jackson FRHistS
- Born: Janet Clare Louise Jackson; 1972 (age 53–54)
- Occupations: Historian and academic
- Spouse: Mark Goldie
- Awards: Wolfson History Prize (2022); Elizabeth Longford Prize (2026)

Academic background
- Education: Loretto School; Sidney Sussex College, Cambridge; Aberystwyth University
- Doctoral advisor: Mark Goldie

Academic work
- Discipline: History
- Sub-discipline: Early modern Britain; Stuart period; Stuart Restoration; Political history
- Institutions: Sidney Sussex College, Cambridge; Trinity Hall, Cambridge
- Notable works: Devil-Land: England under Siege, 1588–1688 (2021); The Mirror of Great Britain: A Life of James VI & I (2025)

Janet Clare Louise Jackson FRHistS (born 1972) is a British historian and academic, specialising in early modern Britain. She was senior tutor of Trinity Hall, Cambridge from 2013 to 2023, and is now Walter Grant Scott Fellow in History and Honorary Professor of Early Modern History. In 2022, she was awarded the Wolfson Prize for Devil-Land: England Under Siege, 1588–1688.

Jackson was educated at Loretto School in Musselburgh, Scotland. She studied history at Sidney Sussex College, Cambridge (BA), then undertook a Master of Philosophy (MPhil) degree in history at Aberystwyth University, before returning to Sidney Sussex College for her Doctor of Philosophy (PhD) degree and, later, a research fellowship.

Jackson edited The Historical Journal from 2004 to 2011. She has appeared as an expert commentator on the BBC Radio 4 programmes In Our Time and Start the Week, and presented the BBC Two series The Stuarts (2014) and The Stuarts in Exile (2015).

== Personal life ==
Jackson is married to fellow historian Mark Goldie, who also supervised her PhD thesis.

== Selected works ==
- Jackson, Clare (2003). Restoration Scotland, 1660–1690: Royalist Politics, Religion and Ideas. Woodbridge: Boydell Press. ISBN 978-0851159300.
- Jackson, Clare (2016). Charles II: The Star King. Penguin Monarchs. London: Allen Lane. ISBN 978-0141979762.
- Jackson, Clare (2021). Devil-Land: England under Siege, 1588-1688. London: Allen Lane. ISBN 978-0241285817.
- Jackson, Clare (2025). The Mirror of Great Britain: A Life of James VI and I. Allen Lane; Liveright.
