= Rosemary Hill =

English writer and historian

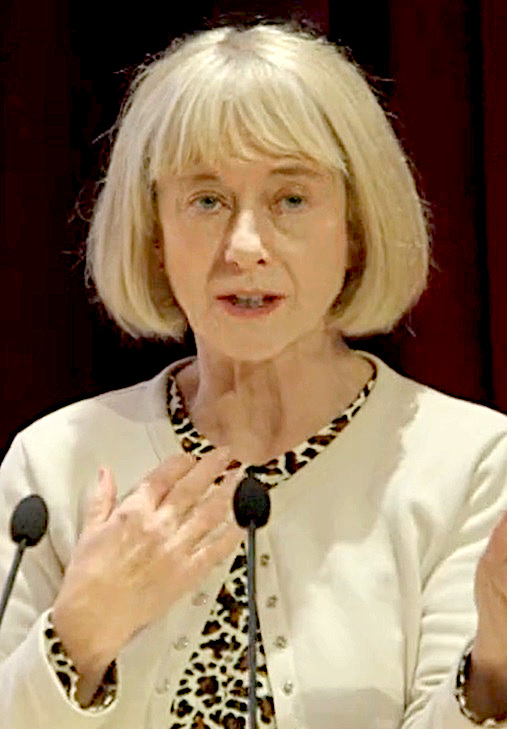
- Hill in 2022
- Born: 10 April 1957 (age 69); London, England
- Education: Newnham College, Cambridge, University of London
- Occupations: writer, historian and independent scholar

Rosemary Hill FRSL, FSA (born 10 April 1957) is an English writer, historian and independent scholar who specialises on the cultural history of the 19th and 20th centuries.

== Early life ==
Hill was born on 10 April 1957 in London, England.

She studied English Literature at Newnham College, Cambridge, graduating in 1979. She achieved her PhD from the University of London in 2011.

== Career ==
Hill has published widely on antiquarianism and the cultural history of the romantic period of the 19th- and 20th-centuries, but is best known for God's Architect: Pugin and the building of Romantic Britain (2007), her biography of Augustus Pugin. The book won the Wolfson History Prize, the James Tait Black Memorial Prize, the Elizabeth Longford Prize, and the Marsh Biography Award.

She was elected a Fellow of the Royal Society of Literature in 2010.

Hill is a trustee of the Victorian Society, a contributing editor to the London Review of Books, and a Quondam Fellow of All Souls College, Oxford. She was a member of the English Heritage Blue Plaques Panel from 2014 to 2022.

In 2023, Hill was a Visiting Fellow at Melbourne University's department of Architecture Building and Planning.

== Personal life ==
Hill has been married twice. Her first husband was the poet Christopher Logue (1926–2011), whom she married in 1985; and her second was the architectural historian and journalist Gavin Stamp (1948–2017), whom she married on 10 April 2014.

== Select publications ==
Books:

- Time’s Witness: History in the age of Romanticism (Allen Lane) (2021)
- Stonehenge (Profile) (2008)
- God’s Architect: Pugin and the building of Romantic Britain (Allen Lane) (2007)
