= The Pursuit of Italy =

2011 book by David Gilmour

- Author: David Gilmour
- Language: English
- Publisher: Allen Lane
- Publication date: 2011
- Publication place: United Kingdom
- Pages: 447
- ISBN: 9781846142512

The Pursuit of Italy: A History of a Land, Its Regions and Their Peoples is a 2011 book by the British historian David Gilmour. It is about Italian history, identity and unity. Gilmour argues that the unification of Italy may have been a failure or unnecessary, suggesting that the country would be better off as many smaller states.
