= The Long Recessional =

2003 book by David Gilmour

- Author: David Gilmour
- Language: English
- Subject: Rudyard Kipling
- Genre: biography
- Publisher: Pimlico
- Publication date: 6 February 2003
- Publication place: United Kingdom
- Pages: 384
- ISBN: 9780712665186

The Long Recessional: The Imperial Life of Rudyard Kipling is a 2003 book by the British historian David Gilmour. It is about the writer Rudyard Kipling, particularly his relationship with British imperialism and his complex and nuanced portrayals of the nationalities and ethnic relations within the British Empire.

The book received the Elizabeth Longford Prize for Historical Biography.
