= Dispossessed: The Ordeal of the Palestinians 1917–1980 =

1980 book by David Gilmour

Dispossessed
- Author: David Gilmour
- Language: English
- Subject: Palestinians
- Genre: history
- Publisher: Sidgwick & Jackson
- Publication date: 1980
- Publication place: United Kingdom
- Pages: 242
- ISBN: 0283986875

Dispossessed: The Ordeal of the Palestinians 1917–1980 is a history book about the Palestinians, beginning with the year of the Balfour Declaration. The book was written by the British historian David Gilmour and published by Sidgwick & Jackson in 1980.

== Summary ==
Gilmour covers the Balfour Declaration of 1917, which declared the goal to create a Jewish "national home" in Palestine, and its opposition by the Conservative politician George Curzon. The book goes into the emergence of Arab nationalism and how waves of Zionist terrorism and pro-Zionist pressure from the United States eventually prompted the United Kingdom to withdraw from the region and allow the United Nations (UN) to determine its future. The UN ignored the Peel Commission's partition plan of 1937 and instead favoured a two-state solution where a significantly larger portion—with a majority Arab population—was declared Jewish territory.

The book focuses on the consequences of these developments for the Palestinians. Gilmour disproves several claims used in Zionist propaganda, such as the claim that Palestinians had been ordered by their leaders to leave their homes. Gilmour presents documentation for how Zionist policy already before 1948 had been to actively drive out the Palestinians. He traces Israeli campaigns and policies to attack Palestinian civilians and usurp land and property.
