= Marne Lateral Canal =

Canal in northeastern France

Coordinates: 48.7303°N 4.6067°E

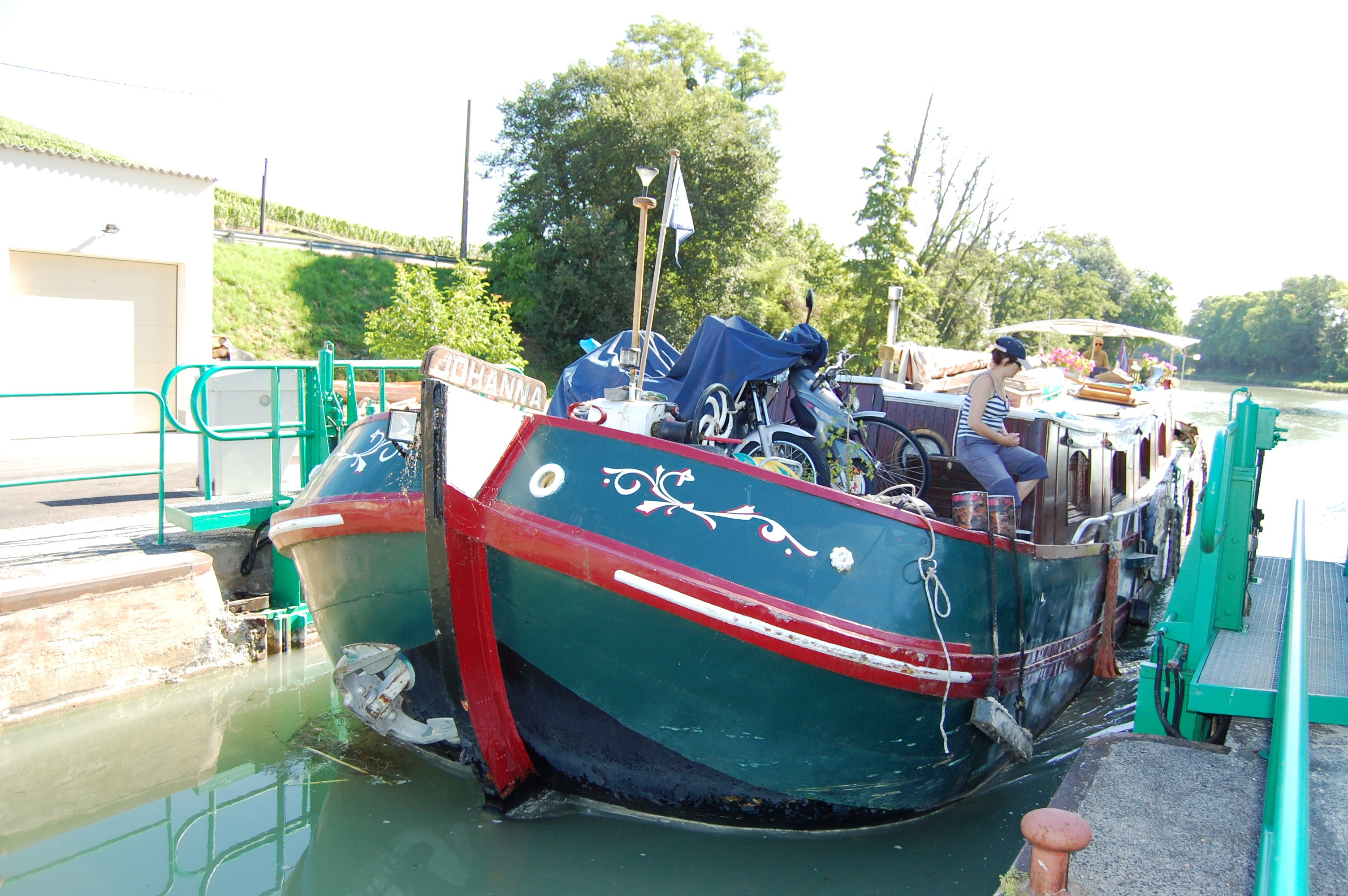
One of the canal's 15 locks

The canal latéral à la Marne (French pronunciation: [kanal lateʁal a la maʁn]) is a 66 km (41 mi) long canal in the Marne department in north-eastern France. It connects Vitry-le-François to Épernay, and includes 15 locks. It overcomes a height difference of 34 meters and runs parallel to the river Marne.

== See also ==
- The Carter of 'La Providence', an Inspector Maigret novel set at Lock 14.
