= David Gilmour (historian) =

British author and baronet

The Honourable Sir David Gilmour Bt FRSL
- Born: 14 November 1952 (age 73)
- Education: Balliol College, Oxford
- Occupation: Writer
- Spouse: Sarah Bradstock (m. 1975)
- Children: 4
- Father: Ian Gilmour
- Relatives: Oliver Gilmour (brother); Andrew Gilmour (brother); Walter Montagu-Douglas-Scott (grandfather)

The Honourable Sir David Robert Gilmour, 4th Baronet, FRSL (born 14 November 1952) is a British writer and historian. The son of the Conservative politician Ian Gilmour, he is the author of numerous historical works, including biographies Curzon: Imperial Statesman, of Lord Curzon (winner of the Duff Cooper Prize), and The Long Recessional, of Rudyard Kipling (winner of the Elizabeth Longford Prize for Historical Biography).

== Biography ==
Sir David Gilmour is the eldest son of Ian Gilmour, Baron Gilmour of Craigmillar, 3rd Baronet, and Lady Caroline Margaret Montagu-Douglas-Scott, the youngest daughter of the 8th Duke of Buccleuch. Princess Margaret was his sponsor at his christening. He became the 4th Baronet on the death of his father in 2007. He is a first cousin of Richard Scott, 10th Duke of Buccleuch, one of the largest private landowners in Scotland, and Ralph Percy, 12th Duke of Northumberland.

Gilmour was educated at Eton and Balliol College, Oxford. He is a Fellow of the Royal Society of Literature (FRSL), a former research fellow of St Antony's College, Oxford, and a former senior research associate of Balliol College, Oxford.

He has also reviewed for publications such as the London Review of Books, the Financial Times, Corriere della Sera, the Times Literary Supplement, The Spectator, the Independent on Sunday, and the New York Review of Books.

== Personal life ==
He married Sarah Anne Bradstock, the only daughter of Michael Hilary George Bradstock on 27 September 1975. They have four children:

- Rachel Ann Caroline Gilmour (21 December 1977)
- Alexander Ian Michael Gilmour (19 February 1980)
- Katharine Victoria Mary Gilmour (1984)
- Laura Elizabeth Rose Gilmour (1985)

== Works ==
- Dispossessed: The Ordeal of the Palestinians 1917–1980, (1980)
- Lebanon: The Fractured Country, (1983)
- The Transformation of Spain: from Franco to the Constitutional Monarchy, (1985)
- The Last Leopard: A Life of Giuseppe Tomasi di Lampedusa, (1988, new edition by Eland published in 2007)
- The Hungry Generations, (1991)
- Cities of Spain, (1992)
- Curzon: Imperial Statesman (1994) Duff Cooper Prize, shortlisted for Whitbread Prize, Saltire Prize and Marsh Biography Award
- The French and their Revolution (ed), (1988)
- Paris & Elsewhere (ed), (1998)
- The Long Recessional: The Imperial Life of Rudyard Kipling (2002) (Elizabeth Longford Prize for Historical Biography 2003)
- The Ruling Caste: Imperial Lives in the Victorian Raj (2005)
- The Pursuit of Italy: A History of a Land, its Regions and their Peoples (2011),
- The British in India: A Social History of the Raj (2018)

== See also ==
- List of Old Etonians born in the 20th century#1950s

Baronetage of the United Kingdom
Preceded by Ian Gilmour	Baronet (of Liberton and Craigmillar); 2007–present	Incumbent
