= Justin Champion =

British historian (1960–2020)

Justin Champion (1960 – 10 June 2020) was a British historian and educator. He was head of the Department of History at Royal Holloway, University of London (RHUL) between 2005 and 2010.

== Early life and education ==
Champion was born in Gloucester, where his father was a designer for a local aircraft manufacturer. His father had won a scholarship to study at Cambridge, where he read English and became president of the Junior Common Room at King's College. This experience left an enduring impression on the young Champion, who went on to study at Churchill College, Cambridge.

Champion progressed to study his PhD at Cambridge University, completing his thesis in 1989. Of his time at Cambridge, one contemporary described how Champion 'cut a distinctive figure – the vigorous stride, the mane of golden blond hair, a frank and direct manner. He seemed rather different from and more engaging than the rest of the 17th-century research crowd'.

== Career ==
Upon completing his PhD, Champion worked at the Institute of Historical Research, London. In 1990, he moved to La Sainte Union as lecturer in early modern History. He was appointed to a lectureship at Royal Holloway in 1992.

His research and teaching interests included the history of early modern ideas, blasphemy and irreligion in early modern Europe, Thomas Hobbes, Biblical criticism, urban disease, the history of reading and scholarship, and the use of information technology in the study of history.

Champion was a strong proponent of public history. He presented or appeared in several TV and radio shows about British history, including the Channel 4 drama documentary The Great Plague in 2001, the ITV documentary series Kings and Queens in 2003 and the BBC Four programme Harlots, Housewives and Heroines: A 17th Century History for Girls - Act One: At Court in 2012. He made history features for BBC Radio 3 and 4 on the Glorious Revolution of 1688, the execution of Charles I, the history of duelling and the history of friendship. He was (2014–17) President of the Historical Association and a member of its Committee of Public History. The Historical Association awarded Champion the Medlicott Medal in 2018 for outstanding services to the study of history in 2018.

During his time as the head of the history department at Royal Holloway, the college began offering a Master of Arts programme in Public History in partnership with external heritage and media institutions. Champion stepped down as the head of the history department at Royal Holloway in 2010, but continued to teach at the college. He was working on the thought and influence of Thomas Hobbes' radical criticism of public religion and its relationship with the early Enlightenment at the time of his death.

== Death ==
Champion was diagnosed with brain cancer in 2014. He died on 10 June 2020, aged 59, in the Princess Alice Hospice in Esher.

== Selected publications ==
- Republican Learning. John Toland and the crisis of Christian culture, 1696-1722 (Manchester University Press, 2003)
- John Toland Nazarenus 1718 (edited) (Oxford: Voltaire Foundation, 1999)
- "Bibliography and Irreligion: Richard Smith’s ‘Observations’", The Seventeenth Century X (1995)
- "John Toland: The Politics of Pantheism", Revue de Synthèse 4 ser (1995).
- "Relational Databases and the Great Plague" in History and Computing (1993)
- "Legislators, Impostors and the Politic Origins of Religion: English Theories of Imposture from Stubbe to Toland" in RH Popkin, S Berti (eds.) Heterodoxy, Spinozism and Freethought (Klewer, 1996)
- Europe’s Enlightenment and National Historiographies Europa (1993)
- London’s Dreaded Visitation: The Social Geography of the Great Plague 1665 (London: Historical Geography Research Monograph No. 31, 1995)
- Epidemic Diseases in London (edited) (London, 1993)
- The Pillars of Priestcraft Shaken: The Church of England and its Enemies 1660–1730 (Cambridge, 1992)
