= Patrick Marnham =

English writer, journalist and biographer

Patrick Marnham FRSL
- Born: 1943 (age 82–83); Jerusalem
- Education: Corpus Christi College, Oxford
- Occupations: Writer, journalist and biographe
- Awards: Thomas Cook Travel Book Award; Marsh Biography Award

Patrick Marnham (born 1943) is an English writer, journalist and biographer. He was elected as a Fellow of the Royal Society of Literature in 1988. He is primarily known for his travel writing and for his biographies, where he has covered subjects as diverse as Diego Rivera, Georges Simenon, Jean Moulin and Mary Wesley. His most recent book, published in September 2020, is War in the Shadows: Resistance, Deception and Betrayal in Occupied France, an investigation into the betrayal of a British resistance network in the summer of 1943.

== Early life ==
Born in Jerusalem, Marnham is of English and Irish descent. He is the elder son of Ralph Marnham, who was appointed Surgeon to the Queen and knighted in 1953, and of his wife, Helena Mary Daly, who, as an Irish citizen, had volunteered on the outbreak of war for active service in the Middle East with "the QA's", Queen Alexandra's Royal Army Nursing Corps.

Marnham was educated at St Philip's, a Catholic day school in Kensington, then by the Benedictines of Downside and at Corpus Christi College, Oxford, where he read Jurisprudence. He edited the university newspaper, Cherwell, and was awarded a half-blue for skiing. He was called to the Bar by the Benchers of Gray's Inn in 1966, however, instead of embarking on a legal career, he became a reporter for Private Eye, where he shared an office with both Paul Foot and Auberon Waugh.

As a script writer for the BBC TV satire programme At The Eleventh Hour, his colleagues included Roger McGough, Miriam Margolyes, Richard Neville, Leonard Rossiter, Esther Rantzen and Stephen Frears, among others. The programme was directed by Tony Smith. Marnham later wrote and presented The Messengers, a Granada TV programme on Film.

== Career ==
In the 1970s, as a contributor to Private Eye with a fortnightly column, Marnham described a dispute among the gambling fraternity of the Clermont Club, following the "Lucan murder" case. The crime caused a bitter quarrel between Lord Lucan's friends that led to the suicide of the impecunious artist and flaneur Dominick Elwes. Marnham's article provoked the financier James Goldsmith to prosecute Private Eye for criminal libel. Marnham and the editor Richard Ingrams were committed for trial at the Old Bailey and had to appear in the dock of No. 1 Court, before Goldsmith decided to drop the case. Marnham described the legal battle in Trail of Havoc: In the Steps of Lord Lucan. Marnham and James Comyn QC, the Eye's barrister, became firm friends and Comyn, by then a High Court judge, proposed that they should embark on a new study of the miracles at Lourdes – to be published anonymously "by two barristers". Nothing came of this suggestion but, following the Goldsmith prosecution, Marnham was asked to write the first history of Private Eye. His account was bitterly resented by the paper's first editor Christopher Booker, who tried to prevent its appearance. The book was eventually published in 1982. A brief appearance in the Sunday Times Best Sellers list was terminated when the management of the magazine declined to order a reprint.

In 1968, Marnham had left Private Eye to become assistant features editor of the Daily Telegraph Magazine and a special correspondent for the Daily Telegraph, reporting from Africa and the Middle East. His first book, Road to Katmandu, described an overland journey to Nepal, hitchhiking along "the hippy trail".

Marnham's early writing career was devoted to travel. In the 1970s, he journeyed extensively in Africa, where he was nearly killed by a rhinoceros, an episode described in his second book, Fantastic Invasion. The book painted a scathing picture of imperial legacies and neocolonial interference in African politics. It was praised by Graham Greene and by Doris Lessing, who described it as "an exhilarating Swiftian excursion into human folly". But Edward Hoagland in The New Republic found it too pessimistic, a view echoed by Joseph Lelyveld in the New York Times Book Review. Fantastic Invasion had included a chapter that was critical of the policy of USAID in Africa. In 1977, Marnham had been asked to write a report for the Minority Rights Group on the "Nomads of the Sahel". The report argued that a widely publicised famine in West Africa had not in fact taken place. Instead, a serious drought had been skilfully transformed by a consortium of development experts in USAID, FAO and various British NGOs to undermine the West African economy and increase their own influence in the region. The effect of this intervention on nomadic life in the Sahel was disastrous.

In 1980, he was appointed Literary Editor of The Spectator under Alexander Chancellor. At that time, he led a campaign with Richard West and Auberon Waugh for the installation of a British monument to honour those repatriated to Soviet concentration camps as a result of the Yalta Conference. Despite fierce resistance from the Foreign Office and the Soviet Embassy, a prominent memorial was eventually erected in South Kensington in 1986. He left The Spectator to travel in Mexico and through the war zones of Guatemala, El Salvador and Nicaragua, an experience which he described in So Far from God: A Journey to Central America. Marnham's travel writing was described in the Dictionary of Literary Biography as covering "complex cultural histories" and tackling "substantial questions about belief, skepticism, communal responsibility and individual freedom... In the tradition of such anatomizers of late British imperialism as Graham Greene, Malcolm Lowry and Evelyn Waugh, Marnham documents with tragic irony and self-deprecating wit the fate of parts of the world that were once administered - and are still in many ways controlled – by Europe and the United States... He uses common sense and Orwellian honesty to puncture political illusions and cultural misconceptions about the Third World".

In 1986, Marnham became the first Paris correspondent of the newly-launched broadsheet newspaper The Independent. With his travelling curtailed, he switched to biography in the 1990s, choosing as his first three subjects a Belgian novelist, a Mexican muralist and a French national hero. Muriel Spark wrote that his portrait of Georges Simenon "adds to our understanding not only of Simenon's art but the art of the novel itself". JG Ballard described The Death of Jean Moulin as "a brilliant mix of political thriller and wartime history".

In 1992, following Richard Ingrams's decision to resign from Private Eye, Marnham joined a small group of journalists - including Alexander Chancellor, Auberon Waugh, Stephen Glover and John McEwan – who banded together to launch The Oldie magazine with Ingrams as editor. The venture was largely bankrolled by the Palestinian publisher Naim Attallah, although most of those originally involved in it lost money.

In 2008, Marnham started to work with the Belgian film director Manu Riche and the British screenwriter and historian Steve Hawes on The Man Who Wasn't Maigret, a feature film for the French channel Antenne 2 that was partly inspired by Marnham's biography of Georges Simenon. This venture was followed by a more ambitious project - a film and a book covering the same subject. Snake Dance: Journeys Beneath a Nuclear Sky, was published in 2013. It marked a return to travel writing and described journeys to the Democratic Republic of the Congo, New Mexico and Japan, tracing the story of the atomic bombing of Hiroshima and Nagasaki. It was accompanied by a prize-winning film with the same title, directed by Manu Riche and written and narrated by Marnham. In 2019, Marnham was asked to write the Introduction to the Everyman's Library's edition of VS Naipaul's A Bend in the River. Marnham's most recent book is War in the Shadows: Resistance, Deception and Betrayal in Occupied France (2020), a controversial investigation into the betrayal of PROSPER, an SOE resistance network active in France in the summer of 1943.

He served for 5 years as a judge of the Duff Cooper Prize and was a trustee of the charity CRY, Cardiac Risk in the Young, from 2008 to 2018. His work has been translated into 12 languages.

His books have won the Thomas Cook Travel Book Award and the Marsh Biography Award.

== Books ==
=== Travel books ===
- Road to Katmandu (1971)
- Lourdes, A Modern Pilgrimage (1980)
- So Far from God: A Journey to Central America (1985)
- Snake Dance: Journeys Beneath a Nuclear Sky (2013)

=== Biography ===
- The Man Who Wasn't Maigret: A Portrait of Georges Simenon (1992)
- Dreaming with His Eyes Open: A Life of Diego Rivera (1998)
- Wild Mary: The Life of Mary Wesley (2006)
- Darling Pol: Letters of Mary Wesley and Eric Siepmann 1944–1967 (2017)

=== Current affairs ===
- Fantastic Invasion: Dispatches from Contemporary Africa (1980)
- The Private Eye Story: the first 21 years (1982)
- Trail of Havoc: In the Steps of Lord Lucan (1988)

=== France ===
- Crime and the Académie Française: Dispatches from Paris (1993)
- The Death of Jean Moulin: Biography of a Ghost (2000)
- War in the Shadows: Resistance, Deception and Betrayal in Occupied France (September 2020)

== Awards ==
- Winner of the 1985 Thomas Cook Travel Book Award for So Far From God: Journey to Central America, ISBN 978-0-224-02167-8
- Winner of the Marsh Biography Award for The Man Who Wasn't Maigret: Portrait of Georges Simenon, ISBN 978-0-7475-0884-7
- Fellow of the Royal Society of Literature (elected 1988)
