= The Man Who Wasn't Maigret =

1992 biography of Georges Simenon

- Author: Patrick Marnham
- Language: English
- Subject: Georges Simenon
- Genre: biography
- Publisher: Bloomsbury Publishing
- Publication place: United Kingdom
- English publication date: 16 April 1992
- Pages: 320
- ISBN: 9780747508847

The Man Who Wasn't Maigret: A Portrait of Georges Simenon is a biography about the Belgian writer Georges Simenon, written by the Englishman Patrick Marnham and published by Bloomsbury in 1992. It covers the often contradictory material about Simenon's life, including the correspondences between his prolific literary output and sexual life.

The book received the 1993 Marsh Biography Award.
